= List of bridges in Calgary =

Bridges span the two rivers that cross Calgary: Bow River and Elbow River

The City of Calgary has a number of bridges, spanning the two main rivers that cross the city, Bow River and Elbow River, as well as some other geographical and physical features.

The first building in Calgary was erected in 1872 by Alexis Cardinal, at the request of Constantine Scollen, an Oblate missionary priest, at the confluence of the two rivers.

== Crossings ==
=== Bow River (west of downtown) ===
The Bow River enters the city from west, winds around downtown, then runs south. From west to south, the following structures cross the river.

Bridge	Carries	Length	Built	Coordinates	Image	Remarks
Bearspaw Dam	Utility		1954	51.10124°N 114.28251°W		Dam on Calgary's west limits, east of Bearspaw; built in 1954, owned and maintained by TransAlta
Stoney Trail Bow River Bridges	Stoney Trail	476 m	1997/2023	51.09798°N 114.23219°W	Stoney Trail Bridge	Between Trans Canada Highway and Tuscany; The northbound bridges lower pedestrian deck connects to the south and north Bow River pathways
85 St NW Bridge	85 Street NW			51.09794°N 114.21052°W	85 St SW Bridge	Between Bowness and Scenic Acres
Bowness Pedestrian Bridge	Pathway			51.09785°N 114.20138°W	CPR Bowness Bridge	Connects Bow River pathways between Bowmont Park Natural Area and Bowness
Bowness Railway Bridge	Canadian Pacific Railway			51.09797°N 114.20002°W	CPR Bowness Bridge	
John Hextall Bridge	Pedestrian/Cycle		1910	51.07869°N 114.17229°W	CPR and TC1 Bridges	Between Bowness and Montgomery; parallels Shouldice Bridge and is used for pedestrian and bicycle traffic only; originally carried a streetcar.
Shouldice Bridge	Bowness Road NW			51.07863°N 114.17236°W	CPR and TC1 Bridges	Between Bowness, Shouldice Park and Montgomery
TCH Bridge	16 Avenue NW			51.07722°N 114.17745°W	CPR and TC1 Bridges	Between Sarcee Trail and Montgomery
Harry Boothman Bridge	Pedestrian			51.06464°N 114.15453°W	Edworthy Park Bridge	Pedestrian alley in Edworthy Park, between the Bow River pathways; named for Harry Boothman. superintendent and director of Calgary Parks from 1958 to 1976
Crowchild Trail Bridge	Crowchild Trail			51.04686°N 114.11494°W	Crowchild Trail	Between Shaganappi and Kensington, lower pedestrian deck connects pathways on each side of the river
Mewata Bridge	14 Street W		1954	51.04801°N 114.09471°W	14 St SW Bridge	Between Kensington and Sunalta

=== Bow River (downtown) ===
Bridge	Carries	Length	Built	Coordinates	Image	Remarks
Louise bridge	10 Street SW	172 m	1921	51.05116°N 114.08490°W	Louise Bridge	Connects Downtown West End with Memorial Drive and Kensington; named after Louise Cushing, daughter of William Henry Cushing, Calgary mayor from 1900 to 1901
Sunnyside C-Train Bridge	C-Train Route 201 and pedestrian (lower deck)		1987	51.05184°N 114.08337°W	Lower deck used as pedestrian walkway	Between Sunnyside and 8 Street SW stations; lower deck is a pedestrian walkway
Peace Bridge	Pedestrian and bicycle	125 m	2012	51.05375°N 114.07913°W	Peace Bridge	between Downtown and Sunnyside
Prince's Island Causeway	Pedestrian and service road			51.05367°N 114.07643°W	Prince's Island Causeway	Connects Eau Claire Park pathway with west part of Prince's Island Park, provides access to Enmax stage
Prince's Island Bridge	Pedestrian			51.05704°N 114.06919°W	Prince's Island Bridge	Connects Prince's Island Park with Sunnyside, also crosses Memorial Drive
Jaipur Bridge	Pedestrian			51.05432°N 114.06959°W	Jaipur Bridge	Connects Prince's Island Park with Eau Claire
Prince's Island Bridge East End	Pedestrian pathway			51.05424°N 114.06742°W	Pedestrian east bridge	Connects eastern Prince's Island Park with Eau Claire and Chinatown
Centre Street Bridge	Centre Street	178 m	1916	51.05291°N 114.06255°W	Centre Street Bridge	Connects Downtown Calgary to Crescent Heights; lower deck connects Chinatown to Memorial Drive
4th Avenue Flyover	4th Avenue SE		1972	51.05014°N 114.05265°W	4th Avenue Flyover	Connects Memorial Drive to Downtown Calgary
5th Avenue Flyover	5th Avenue SE			51.04937°N 114.05098°W	4th Avenue Flyover, Langevin Bridge and C-Train Bridge	Connects Downtown Calgary to Memorial Drive, Crescent Heights and Bridgeland.
Reconciliation Bridge	Edmonton Trail		1910	51.04992°N 114.05230°W	Langevin Bridge	Connects Bridgeland to Downtown Calgary; south terminus of Edmonton Trail. Formerly called the Langevin Bridge (1910-2017), named for Sir Hector Langevin
C-Train SE/Bridgeland Bridge	C-Train Route 202		1985	51.04928°N 114.05027°W	4th Avenue Flyover, Langevin Bridge and C-Train Bridge	Between 3 Street SE and Bridgeland/Memorial stations
George C. King Bridge (formerly St. Patrick's Island Bridge)	Bow River pathways		2014	51.04731°N 114.04629°W		Connects Downtown East Village, Fort Calgary and Bow River pathways with St Patrick Island and Calgary Zoo; new project to cross to Bridgeland
Baines Bridge	Zoo Road			51.04724°N 114.03624°W	View from St George Drive Bridge	Connects Calgary Zoo and Bridgeland
Zoo Bridge (W)	Calgary Zoo pathway			51.04654°N 114.03090°W		Connects main Calgary Zoo exhibits with the Prehistoric Park
Zoo Bridge (E)	Calgary Zoo pathway			51.04578°N 114.02798°W	Zoo Bridge East	Connects main Calgary Zoo exhibits with the Canadian Wilds
St. Georges Zoo Bridge	12 Street SE			51.04339°N 114.03219°W	St George Zoo Bridge	Connects Calgary Zoo with Inglewood
Canadian Pacific Bridge (Nose Creek)	Canadian Pacific Railway			51.04440°N 114.01879°W	Canadian Pacific Railway Bridge in background	Railroad bridge

=== Bow River (south of downtown) ===
Bridge	Carries	Length	Built	Coordinates	Image	Remarks
Cushing Bridge	Blackfoot Trail SE / 17 Avenue SE			51.03736°N 114.01280°W		Connects Inglewood with Forest Lawn; named after William Henry Cushing, Calgary mayor from 1900 to 1901
CPR Bonnybrook Bridge	Canadian Pacific Railway			51.014254°N 114.012294°W		Pony truss railroad bridge, connects three main tracks (P-1 mainline, P-2 lead and Old Ogden lead) with CPR Alyth Yard. The bridge is partially collapsed after flooding of Bow River in June 2013. Steel bridge added in 1971. and Old Ogden lead,
CNR Bow River Bridge	Canadian National Railway			51.014403°N 114.011521°W		Through truss bridge has a single track.
Bonnybrook Bridge	Ogden Road SE			51.01290°N 114.01284°W		Vehicular bridge carries Ogden Road and connects Alyth with Foothills Industrial Park
Calf Robe Bridge	Deerfoot Trail			51.00856°N 114.01869°W		Connects Deerfoot trail from Glenmore Trail to Peigan Road; named after Ben Calf Robe, a Siksika chief
Canadian National Bridge	CN Railway			51.00437°N 114.02195°W		Connects Canadian Pacific Railway to Canadian National Railway
Graves Bridges	Glenmore Trail			50.98658°N 114.02466°W		Connects Alyth to Riverbend and Ogden, leads to Highway 8 east; twinned in 2009
Eric Harvie Bridge	Pedestrian			50.96957°N 114.02575°W		Connects Southland Drive and Acadia to Riverbend
Lafarge Bridge	Road			50.95651°N 114.02295°W		Connects Lafarge cement plant to Douglasglen. Damaged in 2005 flood, subsequently removed.
Ivor Strong Bridge	Deerfoot Trail			50.95259°N 114.02058°W		Connects Maple Ridge to Douglasdale at the Anderson Road alignment; named after John Ivor Strong, Chief Commissioner for the City of Calgary from 1965 to 1971
Douglasdale Park Pedestrian Bridge	Pedestrian			50.94090°N 114.01109°W		Connects Douglasdale Park to Queensland
McKenzie Pedestrian Bridge	Pedestrian			50.91178°N 113.99827°W		Connects Deer Ridge with McKenzie Lake
Marquis de Lorne Bridges	Stoney Trail		2009/2023	50.89435°N 114.00937°W	Marquis de Lorne Bridge	Connects Stoney Trail from Sundance and Chaparral across Fish Creek Provincial Park to McKenzie Lake and Cranston
Chapparal Pedestrian Bridge	Pedestrian		2023	50.891817°N 114.007419°W		Connects Chapparal to Cranston
Dunbow Bridges	Deerfoot Trail			50.85420°N 113.97095°W		Connects Deerfoot Trail to Macleod Trail south of Calgary, between Cranston/Seton and Heritage Pointe

=== Elbow River ===
The Elbow River enters the city in the southwest, then turns north and merges into the Bow River immediately east of downtown. From west to north, the following structures cross the river.

Bridge	Carries	Length	Built	Coordinates	Image	Remarks
Twin Bridges	Alberta Highway 8			51.01693°N 114.24017°W		Highway 8 named Stoney Trail east of this point
Weaselhead Road Bridge	Weasel Head Road			50.992513°N 114.168360°W		Private bridge for road traffic, inside the limits of the Tsuut'ina Nation reserve
Tsuu'tina Trail Bridges	Tsuu'tina Trail			50.992513°N 114.168360°W		Bridges going north and southbound on Tsuu'tina Trail over the Elbow
Barry Erskine Bridge	Pedestrian			50.99139°N 114.14667°W		Bridge within the Weaslehead Natural Area
Glenmore Trail Causeway	Glenmore Trail			50.99530°N 114.09928°W	Glenmore Trail over Glenmore Reservoir	Crosses the Glenmore Reservoir
Glenmore Dam	Pedestrian, maintenance road		1933	50.99990°N 114.09715°W		Dam, created Glenmore Reservoir, allows pedestrian access and maintenance vehicles (no public vehicle access) along Glenmore Bridge Rd.
Sandy Beach Bridge	Pedestrian		1959	51.01199°N 114.09182°W		Connects River Park (in Altadore) and Riverdale Park (in Britannia)
Elbow Park Britannia Pedestrian Bridge	Pedestrian			51.01887°N 114.08317°W		Connects Elbow River bike and pathway; between Elbow Park and Britannia
Elbow Drive Bridge	Elbow Drive			51.01786°N 114.07788°W		Connects the neighbourhoods of Elbow Park and Britannia
Elbow Park Rideau Park Pedestrian Bridge	Pedestrian			51.02495°N 114.07779°W		Connects Elbow River bike and pathway; between Elbow Park and Rideau Park
4 St SW Bridge	4 Street SW			51.02934°N 114.07152°W	4 St SW Bridge	Connects the neighbourhoods of Mission and Roxboro
Scollen Bridge	25 Avenue SW			51.03041°N 114.06343°W	Scollen Bridge	Connects the neighbourhoods of Mission and Erlton
21 Ave SW MNP Pedestrian Bridge	Pedestrian			51.03421°N 114.06751°W	21 Ave SW MNP Pedestrian Bridge	Between 21 Ave SW and the MNP Community & Sport Centre grounds
19 Ave SW MNP Pedestrian Bridge	Pedestrian			51.03588°N 114.06538°W	19 Ave SW MNP Pedestrian Bridge	Between 19 Ave SW (behind St. Mary's Cathedral and the MNP Community & Sport Centre grounds
Pattison Bridge	Macleod Trail South			51.03600°N 114.06126°W	Macleod Trail South Bridge	Between Mission and MNP Community & Sport Centre, named for John George Pattison, Victoria Cross recipient of the 50th Battalion, CEF.
Victoria Bridge	Macleod Trail North			51.03448°N 114.05911°W	Victoria Bridge	Between Mission and MNP Community & Sport Centre
Macleod Train Bridge	C-Train			51.03389°N 114.05889°W	Macleod Train Bridge	Between Mission and MNP Community & Sport Centre
Stampede Trail Bridge	Stampede Trail SE			51.03265°N 114.05675°W	Stampede Trail Bridge	Provides entry into the Calgary Stampede grounds and access to the Stampede Grandstand
Stampede Ground Bridge	maintenance road			51.03111°N 114.05056°W	Stampede Ground Bridge	Provides access Calgary Stampede ground buildings
Stampede Ground Bridge	maintenance road			51.03139°N 114.05028°W	Stampede Ground Bridge	Provides access Calgary Stampede ground buildings
Saddledome Trail Bridge	Pedestrian			51.03694°N 114.04972°W	Saddledome Trail Bridge	Provides entry into the Calgary Stampede grounds and access to the Scotiabank Saddledome
Agriculture Trail Bridge	Agriculture Trail SE			51.03858°N 114.04873°W	Agriculture Trail Bridge	Service road from Calgary Stampede grounds
Macdonald Avenue Bridge	Macdonald Avenue SE		1911	51.04132°N 114.04474°W	Macdonald Avenue Bridge	Connects the neighbourhoods of Victoria Park and Ramsay
Canadian Pacific Rail Bridge (Inglewood)	Canadian Pacific Railway			51.04318°N 114.04287°W	Macdonald Avenue Bridge, CPR Bridge and Inglewood Bridge	Connects the Canadian Pacific Railway downtown yard with the CPR Alyth Yard
9 Ave SE (Inglewood) Bridge	9 Avenue SE		2022	51.04363°N 114.04277°W	9th Avenue (Inglewood) Bridge	Original bridge was built in 1909 and demolished in 2019 to make room for its replacement (pictured). The Bridge provides access between Downtown East Village and Inglewood

=== Fish Creek ===
Fish Creek flows from west to east in the south part of the city, through the Fish Creek Provincial Park. It merges into the Bow River in the southeast quadrant of the city.

Bridge	Carries	Length	Built	Coordinates	Image	Remarks
37 St SW Bridge	37 St SW			50.92781°N 114.14005°W		Connects the neighbourhoods of Woodbine and Evergreen
Fish Creek Pedestrian Bridge no. 1	Pathway			50.92875°N 114.13728°W		Connects pathways in the Fish Creek Provincial Park
Fish Creek Pedestrian Bridge no. 2	Pathway			50.92765°N 114.12604°W		Connects pathways in the Fish Creek Provincial Park
Fish Creek Pedestrian Bridge no. 3	Pathway			50.92641°N 114.10975°W		Connects pathways in the Fish Creek Provincial Park
Fish Creek Pedestrian Bridge no. 4	Pathway			50.93133°N 114.10870°W		Connects pathways in the Fish Creek Provincial Park
Fish Creek Pedestrian Bridge no. 5	Pathway			50.93297°N 114.10521°W	Pedestrian Bridge in Fish Creek Park	Connects pathways in the Fish Creek Provincial Park
Fish Creek Pedestrian Bridge no. 6	Pathway			50.93405°N 114.10411°W		Connects pathways in the Fish Creek Provincial Park
Fish Creek Pedestrian Bridge no. 7	Pathway			50.93400°N 114.09750°W		Connects pathways in the Fish Creek Provincial Park
CPR Bridge (Fish Creek)	Canadian Pacific Railway			50.92914°N 114.07238°W		Also carriers C-Train tracks
Macleod Trail Bridge	Macleod Trail			50.92895°N 114.06979°W		Connects the neighbourhoods of Canyon Meadows and Lake Bonavista to Shawnee Slopes and Midnapore
Bow Bottom Bridge	Bow Bottom Trail SW			50.90714°N 114.01492°W	Bridge in Fish Creek Park along Bow Bottom trail	Connects the neighbourhoods of Deer Run and Parkland to Sikome Lake and Fish Creek Provincial Park

== See also ==
- List of bridges in Canada
