= Transportation in Calgary =

The city of Calgary, Alberta, has a large transportation network that encompasses a variety of road, rail, air, public transit, and pedestrian infrastructure. Calgary is also a major Canadian transportation centre and a central cargo hub for freight in and out of north-western North America. The city sits at the junction between the "Canamex" highway system and the Trans-Canada Highway (Highway 1 in Alberta).

As a prairie city, Calgary has never had any major impediments to growth. As such, it has developed into a city with an area of about 745 km^{2} (288 sq mi) (of which only half is built up) and a metropolitan area of nearly 5,100 km^{2} (2,000 sq mi). This outward growth has encouraged the development of an extensive personal vehicle-oriented road network complete with a freeway system.

Since 1981, when the city officially opened the first leg of its CTrain rapid transit system, emphasis on public transportation as an alternative to cars has become important. The CTrain has the second-highest light rail system ridership of any North American city, only slightly behind Guadalajara, Mexico. Cycling is also seen as a major alternative to driving in Calgary. In recent years, increases in the population and density of inner-city neighbourhoods such as the Beltline have favoured greater pedestrianism as well.

== Public transportation ==
Calgary's primary public transportation system is operated by Calgary Transit. The service operates only within Calgary city limits and does not provide transportation to and from other communities within the Calgary Region. Some communities within Calgary's metropolitan area provide their own transit services (for example, Airdrie Transit). Calgary Transit is owned and managed by the City of Calgary.

=== Light rail ===
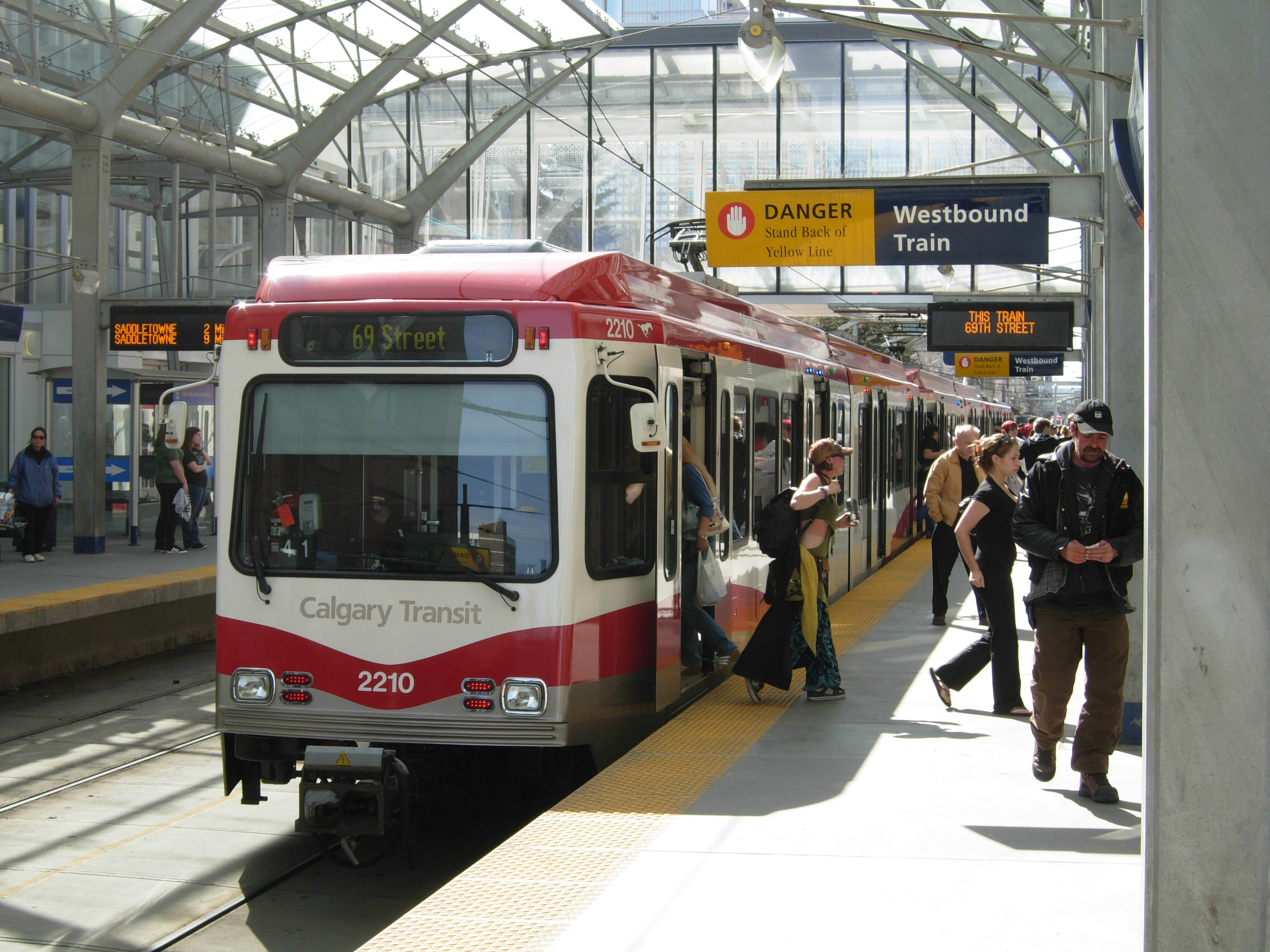
CTrain at City Hall Station

The light rail transit (LRT) system, known as the CTrain, consists of 58.5 km (36.4 mi) of track connecting 45 stations and was the second of such systems built in North America. Until very recently, Calgary and Edmonton were the only two North American cities with populations under two million to operate rapid mass transit systems. As of August 2024, there are two lines in operation, with a third line under construction. All the lines pass through downtown near their midpoints. The routes are as follows:

Name	Route no.	Start terminus	End terminus	Stations
Red Line	201	Tuscany	Somerset-Bridlewood	27
Blue Line	202	Saddletowne	69 Street	26
Green Line	203	Under construction; first stations to open in 2031		

Travel between stations along 7th Avenue in downtown is free-of-charge. Unique to the CTrain system, its power is 100% wind generated and completely free of emissions. The extension of the Blue Line into west Calgary was completed in 2012 and is the most recent section of the network to open.

=== Buses ===
Calgary Transit also has a system of buses, with routes stretching over the whole city. It has won several awards for its efficiency and its environmental responsibility. It consists of 4 major "MAX" express bus routes and over 160 shorter community bus routes that connect to C-train Stations and MAX lines with the whole system stretching over 4,500 km (2,800 mi).

== Roads and streets ==
Calgary road network

Calgary has an extensive street network. Smaller roads are supplemented with a number of major arteries, expressways and freeways. The majority of main expressways and freeways are named Trails, as well as some of the main arterial roads that do not fit in the numbering grid. The use of the term Trails to describe major highways resulted from the development of early pioneer trails into the highways themselves. The original trails were named after the settlements to which they lead; for example, Edmonton Trail (part of the former Calgary and Edmonton Trail), (Fort) Macleod Trail, and Banff Trail (which combined with 24th Street W was later renamed Crowchild Trail). More recently developed local expressways were given the Trail moniker and have been named after important people from Calgary's history (Crowchild Trail, Marquis of Lorne Trail), native groups (Stoney Trail, Sarcee Trail, Blackfoot Trail) or again after their destination (Airport Trail). There are a couple of exceptions to this rule in which a few older residential streets have also been labeled "Trail", such as Morley Trail.

Plans originating in the 1950s and 1960s for a considerably more extensive freeway system including elevated freeways were largely abandoned in favour of a growing trend to reduce the emphasis on roads and increase the amount of public transportation infrastructure in North American cities.

=== Provincial freeways ===
Two freeways within the City of Calgary are wholly controlled and maintained by Alberta's Ministry of Transportation with the city sometimes offering joint funding to construct interchanges with municipal roads. They have the highest construction standards, speed limits of at least 100 km/h (110 km/h on Deerfoot Trail both south of the 212th Avenue northbound exit, and north of Beddington Trail & 11th Street NE) and provided key connections to the rest of the provincial highway network.

Deerfoot Trail (Alberta Highway 2). A 46.4 km major north-to-south freeway in eastern Calgary that forms a key segment of Highway 2, the provinces main north-to-south highway and a key part of the CANAMEX Corridor. The first section of the roadway opened in 1971 originally named as Blackfoot Trail, later renamed to its current name to honour Deerfoot Bad-Meat in 1974 with the south terminus at 16th Avenue NE (Exit 258), later extended to 17th Avenue SE (Exit 254), then getting extended again to Glenmore Trail (Exit 248), and finally majorly extended to Stoney Trail (Exit 234) (in the south) but the whole route was not rendered a freeway until the last signal light was removed in 2005, officially making traffic in the major road entirely free-flowing, but there was more construction to come from the mid-2000s to today.

Stoney Trail (Alberta Highway 201). A 101 km long free flowing ring road that completely encircles most of Calgary and serves as a bypass for traffic wishing to avoid the core areas of the city if they are congested. Provides links to many important provincial highways such as Highway 1, Highway 1A, Highway 8 and Alberta Highway 22X most of which lack high speed connections through the city as well as serving as bypass to Deerfoot Trail. The highway opened in 6 phases from late 1995 to December 31st 2023 (first was the northwest part (1995-2009), then the northeast part (2009), southeast part (2013), north southwest part (2020), south Southwest part (2021), and finally the west part (2023)).

=== Skeletal roads ===
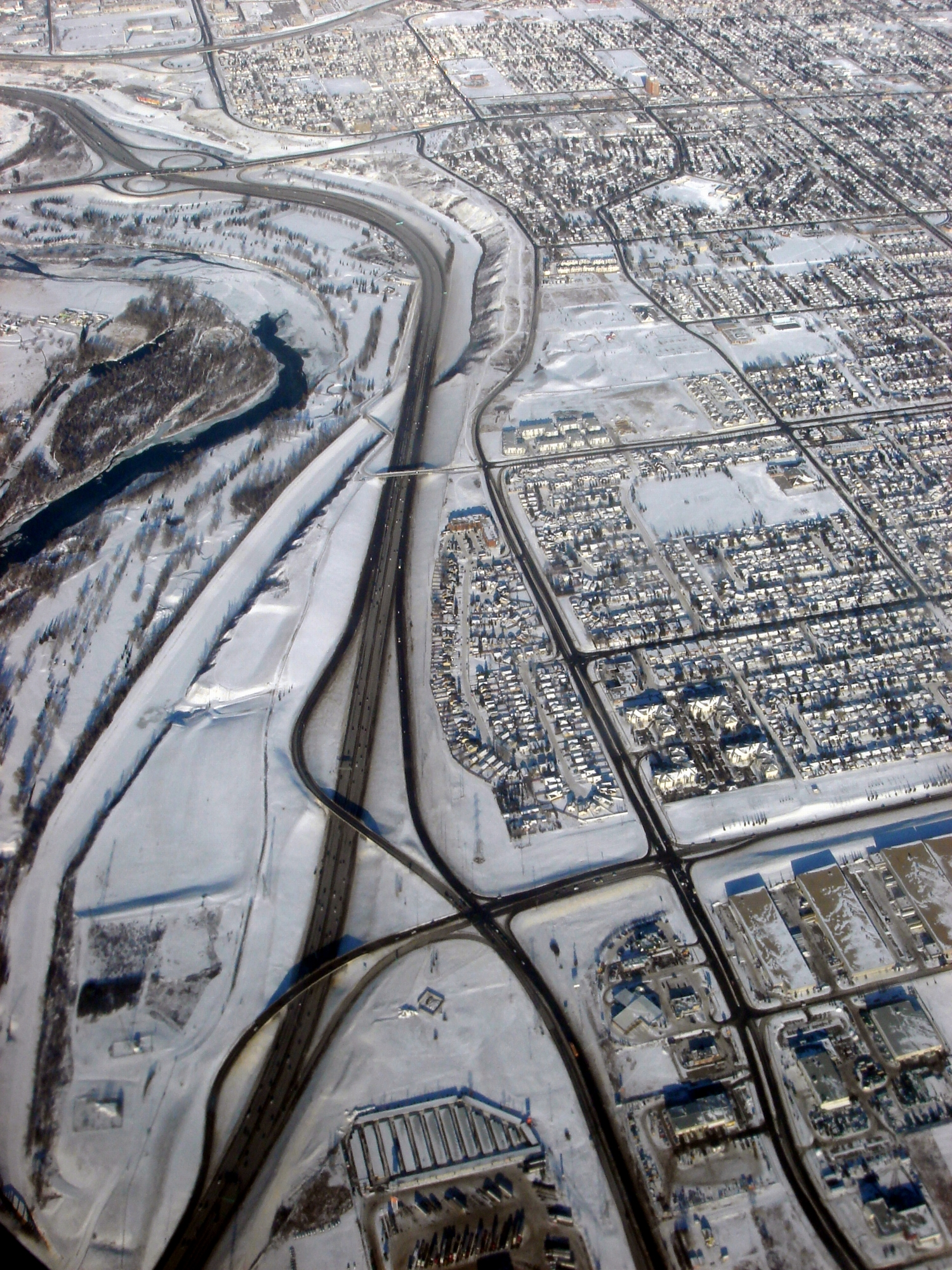
Deerfoot Peigan Trail interchange prior to 2009.

Skeletal roads is the highest designation of road made by the City of Calgary with no clarification being made between controlled access freeways and expressways with spaced out signal lights. Speed limits range from 70 to 90 km/h on these roadways, with freeway conversions being planned on all of the routes.

Significant sections of controlled access freeways are

Crowchild Trail, the main north–south route in Western Calgary, running between the city limits and Glenmore Trail. Two freeway sections in south and north separated by a section with four closely spaced signal lights just north of the Bow River. These signal lights are eventually planned to be replaced with interchanges to render the whole route as Calgary’s potential third or fourth freeway.

Macleod Trail, north–south route in south Calgary. The skeletal-road-designated section between 14th Street and Stoney Trail is a full freeway, and the rest of the route is highly signalized arterial road, there are likely plans to make Macleod Trail a full freeway (it could potentially be the fifth freeway and possibly the final required one).

Sarcee Trail (south section only), a north–south route in west Calgary. It contains three interchanges interspaced with two signal lights with plans for interchanges at all junctions.

Glenmore Trail, the only east–west skeletal road that runs the whole width of Calgary. It runs south of downtown between Stoney Trail in west Calgary and Stoney Trail in east Calgary. While fully a freeway west of the Deerfoot, the eastern section still contains three spaced-out signal lights, but full freeway conversion is eventually planned (Glenmore could be the third or fourth road to be completed as a freeway after Deerfoot, Stoney and possibly Crowchild respectively).

Memorial Drive, serves as a spur into Downtown Calgary from Deerfoot Trail. Only the section between the Reconciliation Bridge and Deerfoot Trail is designated as a skeletal road, with the rest of Memorial Drive being a slower-moving parkway.

16 Avenue N carries the Highway 1 (Trans-Canada Highway) designation. Only the short section between Stoney Trail West and Sarcee Trail and the section east of the Deerfoot are considered skeletal roads and contain interchanges. The heavily signalized section of 16th Avenue through north-central Calgary is designated as an urban boulevard and is never intended to be upgraded to a freeway.

Airport Trail, an east–west road in northeast Calgary whose freeway section serves as spur route from Deerfoot connecting to the Calgary International Airport. The whole route is eventually intended to be upgraded to a freeway.

Bow Trail is a unique case because it contains a significant freeway section between Crowchild Trail and Downtown Calgary but is designated as only an arterial road, which is strictly non-limited access in definition. This is because the city intends for eventually freeway removal on this section of Bow Trail as part of the West Village Redevelopment Plan.

Skeletal roads that do not included significant sections of freeway included Shaganappi Trail, Barlow Trail, Anderson Road, Beddington Trail, 14 Street W, John Laurie/McKnight Boulevard and Peigan Trail.

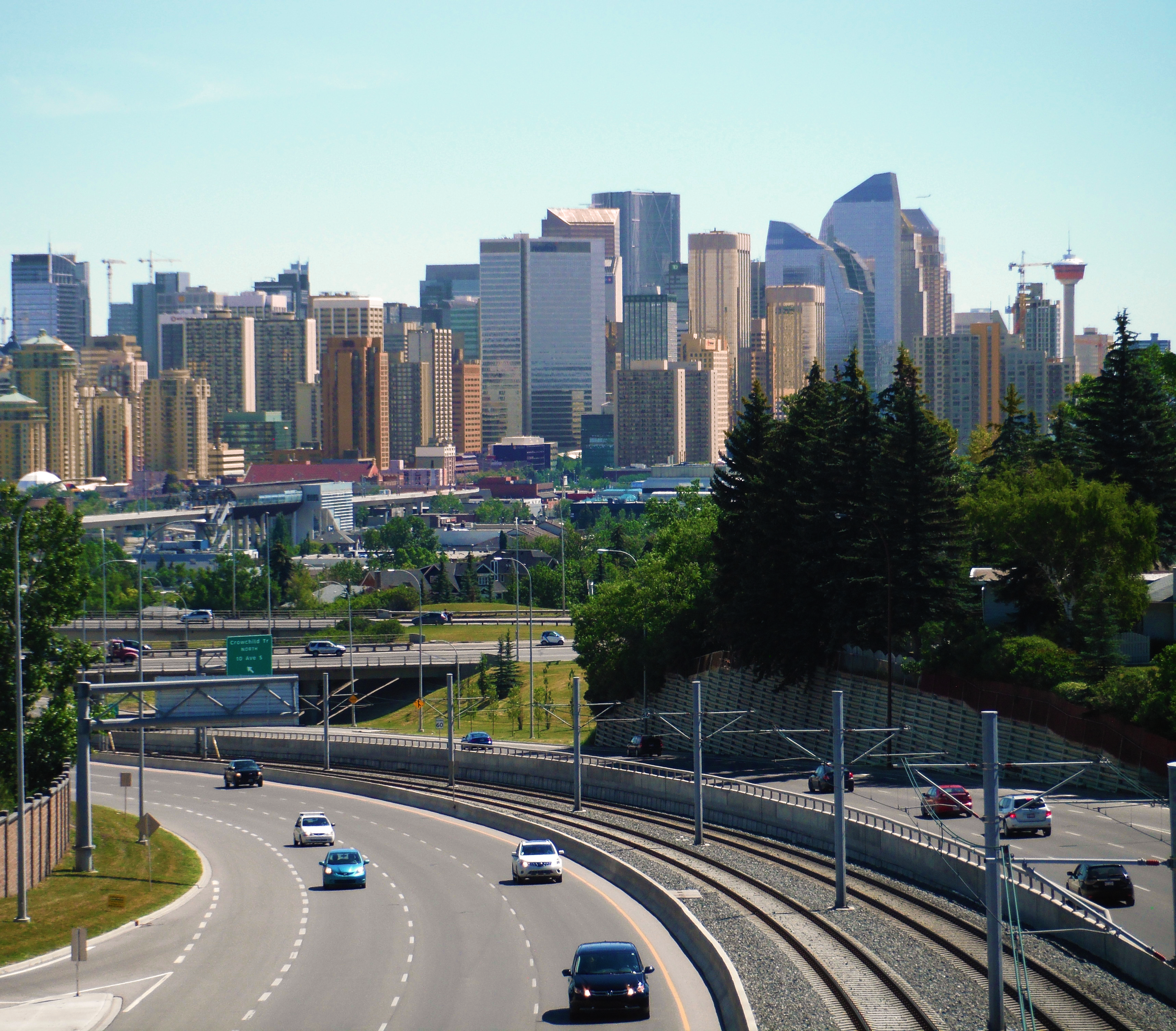
Bow Trail heading east into downtown

=== Municipal roads ===
Excluding the provincial freeways and the skeletal roads other roads defined in the Calgary Transpiration Plan include.

Arterial roads, major signalized roads with 4 to 8 lanes, the most common major road in the city. New arterial roads always include sidewalks on both sides of the road, left turning bays, green buffers, bus bays and Bike lanes or shared-use paths However older arterial roads often lack many of these features, and are only slowly being implemented when major road upgrades occur. Examples include Country Hills Boulevard, 17 Avenue (west portion) and 69th Street W.

Parkways, midsized two-to-four-lane roads that are often near natural areas and seek to encourage green, high-quality natural design such as large green buffers and are often closed to truck traffic. They also seek to have active transportation routes near them and aim to slow car traffic. Examples include Memorial Drive west of Centre Street, Canyon Meadows Drive and Elbow Drive.

Urban boulevards, major heavily signalized two-to-six-lane roads that are similar to arterial roads but instead contain more signal lights, wider sidewalks and better-quality urban design such as fancy light posts and public art. Unlike arterial roads they also often allow on-street parking. The city seeks to line this category of road with high-density development and small businesses and make them major transit routes such as for the MAX transit system. Examples include the central portion of 16 Avenue N, of Centre Street and Macleod Trail near downtown.

Neighbourhood collectors are small two-lane roads that often feature bike lanes and on-street parking. Their purpose is to connect the major city roads to neighbourhoods and homes rather than facilitate longer-distance travel. Unlike the roads mentioned above, these small roads are built and planned by the developers rather than the city, although the latter is responsible for long-term maintenance.

=== Naming system ===
Traditionally Calgary's roads were built on a grid system. Originally, the streets and avenues were named, but after 1904, they were numbered. Today, numbered avenues (running east–west) and streets (running north–south) dominate the city, although names appear to be making a comeback. The city is divided into four quadrants: Northeast, Northwest, Southeast and Southwest, and all street names and addresses end with suffixes corresponding to the quadrant of the city in which they lie (NW, NE, SE or SW). The central point of the quadrant system is the Centre Street Bridge, with Centre Street and Centre Avenue forming the boundaries (although the points vary; most of the south end has Macleod Trail as a boundary, except near Chinook Centre where Macleod Trail bends westward; in the west end, the Bow River forms the boundary for the most part). Roads in predominantly suburban residential areas as well as freeways and expressways do not generally conform to the grid and are usually not numbered as a result (although some suburban streets are indeed numbered if they fall in place on the grid).

The main lines on the grid are fairly evenly distributed at intervals of about 1 mile (1.6 km) where an arterial road (or expressway) is usually situated (on former township and range roads). They are at roughly the following streets and avenues (although not always named as such):

- Avenues north of downtown: 16th, 32nd, 48th, 64th, 80th, 96th, 112th, 128th, 144th
- Avenues south of downtown: 17th, 34th, 50th, 66th, 82nd, 90th, 114th, 130th, 146th, 162nd, 178th, 194th
- Streets east of downtown: 6th, 15th, 24th, 36th, 52nd, 68th, 84th
- Streets west of downtown: 14th, 24th, 37th, 53rd, 69th, 85th, 101st, 117th

A quirk of the numbering is that it was intended for addresses on numbered streets to begin at 100 (not 0) at Centre Street and Centre Avenue and move out accordingly. For example, 545 16th Avenue NW lies between 4th and 5th Streets NW. There are many violations of such, however, especially in suburban areas. The highest address numbers are found on north–south streets in the southernmost suburbs, where they approach 20000.

In neighbourhoods outside of the inner city the name of the streets always correlate with the first three letters of the neighbourhood's name. For example, Shannon Avenue is located in the Shawnessy neighbourhood while Evanspark Way is located in the Evanston neighbourhood.

Sidewalks at intersections in areas outside the downtown core are often stamped with the name of the cross-street, especially in older districts. As this was once done by hand by municipal employees who were not always literate, some street names are misspelled or the letters reversed.

== Air ==
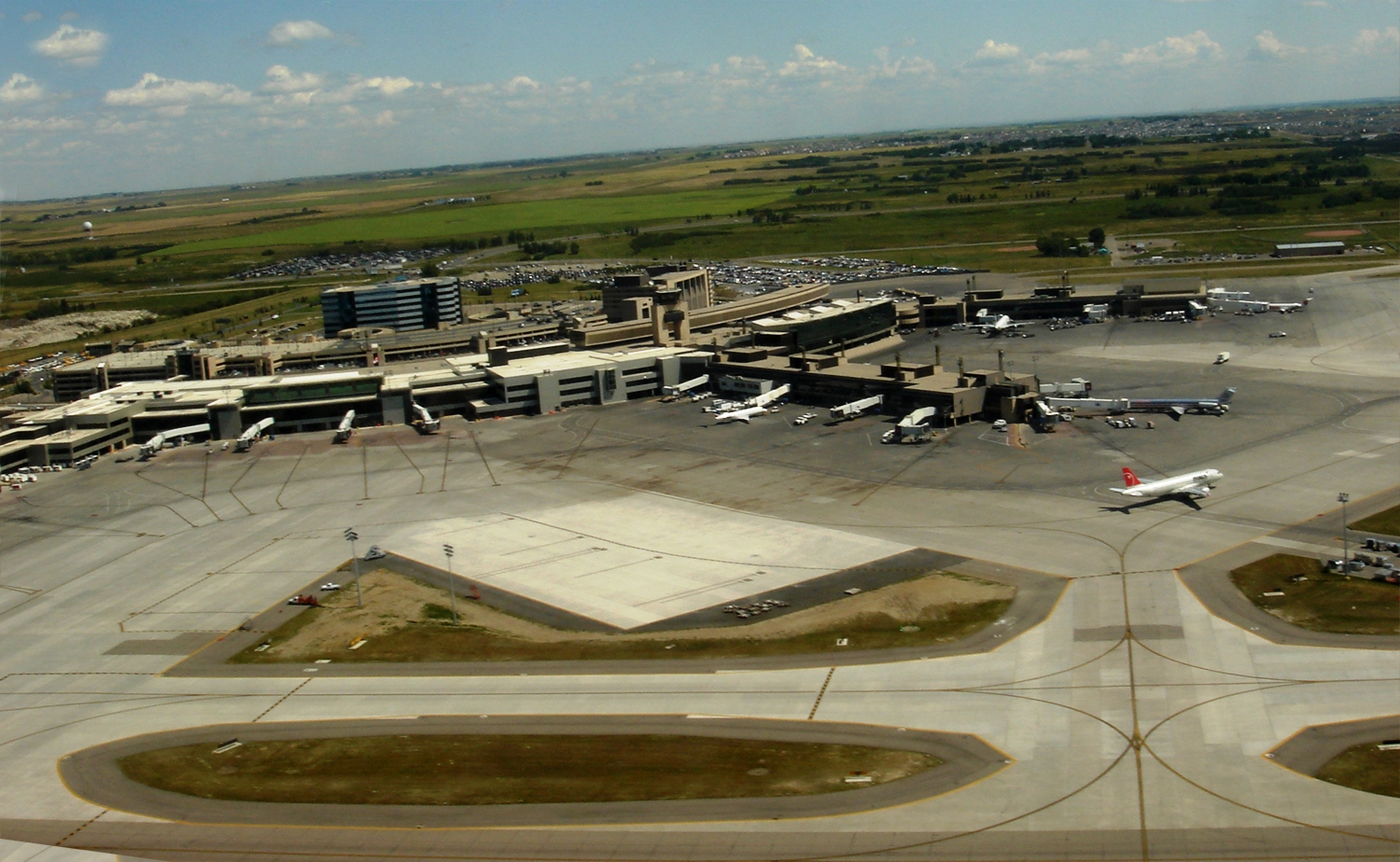
Calgary International Airport

The Calgary International Airport (ICAO Code CYYC, IATA Code YYC) is the only international airport in the Calgary Region and one of only two in the province. The airport is WestJet Airlines's main base and largest hub, and acts as an Air Canada hub. In total, about 20 passenger airlines have regular scheduled flights to and from the airport. It is also a major hub for several cargo airlines including DHL, FedEx, Purolator, and United Parcel Service.

The airport primarily connects Western Canada with non-stop flights to Eastern Canada, 18 major American cities, as well as destinations to Europe, Asia, the Caribbean and Mexico. Calgary International airport also has regular scheduled service to London, Frankfurt, Amsterdam, Mexico City and Tokyo.

Calgary International Airport is Canada's fourth busiest airport in after Toronto Pearson International Airport, Vancouver International Airport and Montreal Trudeau International Airport. In 2008, it served more than 12.5 million passengers and is expected to for several years.

Calgary's second airport, Calgary/Springbank Airport, is located in the western suburb of Springbank, handles the majority of private-plane flights, and acts as a reliever for the main airport while also being the 11th busiest in Canada for aircraft movements.

== Bus ==
=== Intercity ===
Scheduled bus service from Calgary or Calgary Airport and north to Red Deer and Edmonton, or south to Lethbridge, is provided by Red Arrow, and Ebus. Calgary to Medicine Hat is provided by J&L Shuttle of Medicine Hat. Banff Airporter and Brewster provides service between the Calgary Airport and Banff. Brewster also provides service to Lake Louise and Jasper.

Effective October 31, 2018, Greyhound Canada has cancelled all services in Western Canada, which includes Calgary, citing low ridership.

On April 5, 2024, FlixBus began service in Alberta, providing routes from Calgary to Edmonton, Banff, and Lethbridge, with multiple stops along each route. In November, the route to Banff was expanded to reach Lake Louise.

=== Regional ===
On-It Regional Transit provides scheduled bus service to commuter towns surrounding Calgary. Commuter service is provided to Cochrane and Okotoks. On-It also provides a summer weekend and holiday service to Canmore and Banff, Alberta.

== Rail ==
=== Passenger rail ===
Calgary is also the largest Canadian city without intercity passenger service, as all Via Rail service to the city was terminated in the late 1980s and early 1990s by the Conservative government. Rail tours by Royal Canadian Pacific can be booked by private charter. Rocky Mountaineer pulled out some years back and now runs only from Banff, Alberta westward.

=== Freight ===
Calgary has four main Canadian Pacific Kansas City (CPKC) and Canadian National Railway (CN) lines that traverse the city, in addition to the various feeder lines that run through the industrial parks in the eastern half of the city. One of the rail structures in Calgary is the CPKC Alyth Yard, where many of these feeder lines connect to the main lines.

== Bicycle and pedestrian ==
The City of Calgary also maintains a network of paved multi-use pathways (for bicycling, roller skating and jogging). The dedicated pathway network in Calgary is among the most expansive in North America and spans 900 km (560 mi). There are also about 345 km (214 mi) of signed on-street bicycle routes. The pathways connect many of the city's parks, river valley, residential neighbourhoods, and downtown. Calgarians make year-round use of these paths for walking, running, and cycling to various destinations. In June 2013, massive flooding destroyed much of the pathway system (including many pedestrian bridges) along the Elbow and Bow rivers. Most repairs are complete.

Calgary's system of elevated walkways or skyways downtown (known as the +15 system) is the most extensive in the world. These walkways not only serve to connect buildings, but also contain restaurants, shops, and services (most notably incorporating large parts of The Core Shopping Centre). The system is 16 km (9.9 mi) long.

== See also ==
- Bicycle path
- List of bridges in Calgary
- Plug-in electric vehicles in Alberta § Calgary
