= Centre Street Bridge (Calgary) =

Bridge in Calgary, Alberta, Canada

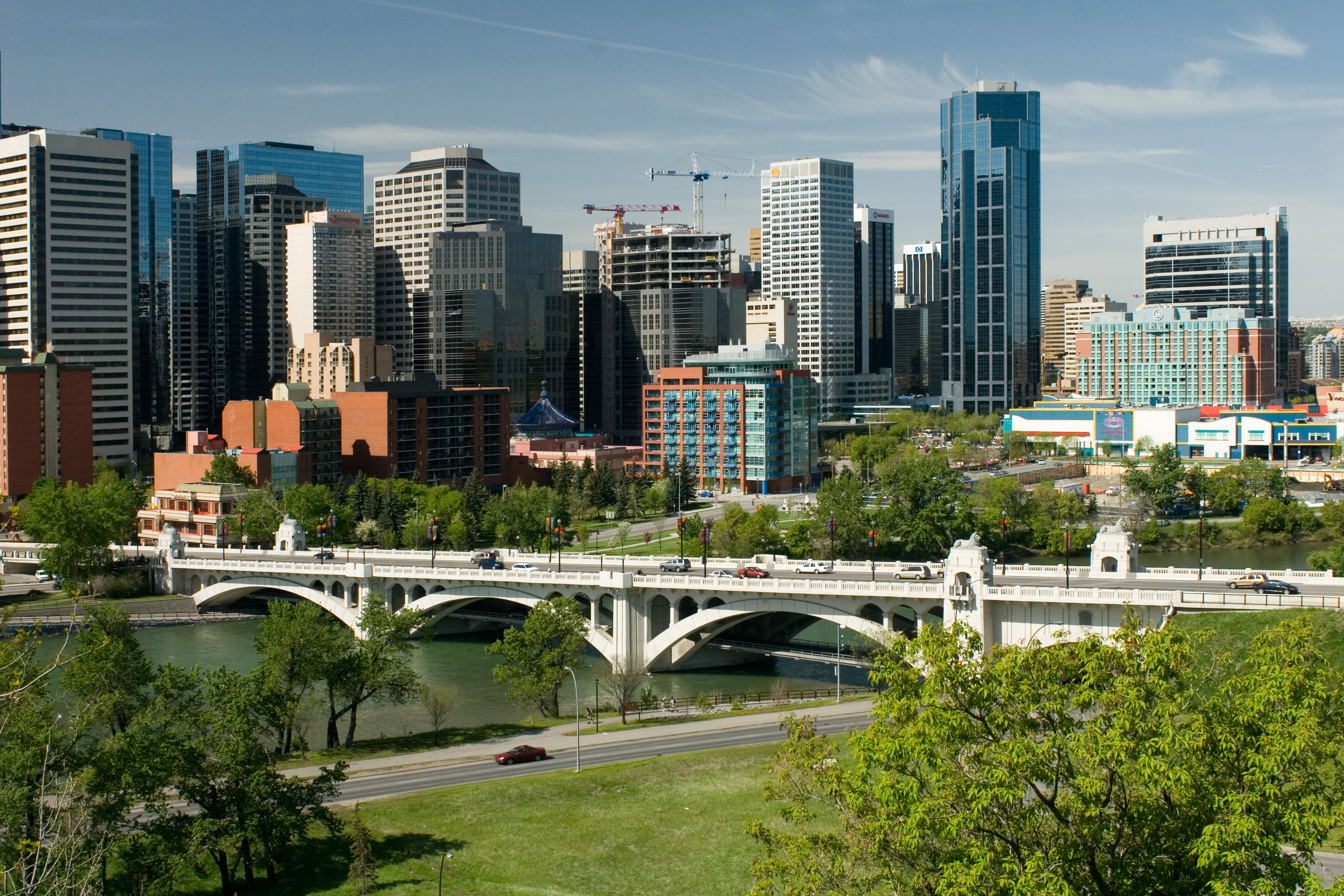
- Centre Street Bridge seen from Crescent Heights
- Coordinates: 51.05291°N 114.06255°W
- Carries: 4 lanes of Centre Street
- Crosses: Bow River, Memorial Drive
- Locale: Calgary, Alberta, Canada
- Maintained by: City of Calgary

Characteristics
- Design: Arch superstructure
- Material: Reinforced concrete
- Total length: 178 meters (584 ft)
- Width: 15 meters (49 ft)
- Piers in water: 2

History
- Designer: John F. Green
- Construction end: 1916
- Opened: 18 December 1916

The Centre Street Bridge is a historic bridge in Calgary, Alberta, crossing the Bow River, along Centre Street. The lower deck connects Riverfront Avenue in Chinatown with Memorial Drive, while the upper elevated deck crosses Memorial Drive as well, reaching into the community of Crescent Heights.

Centre Street Bridge is the central point of the quadrant system of the city.

== History ==
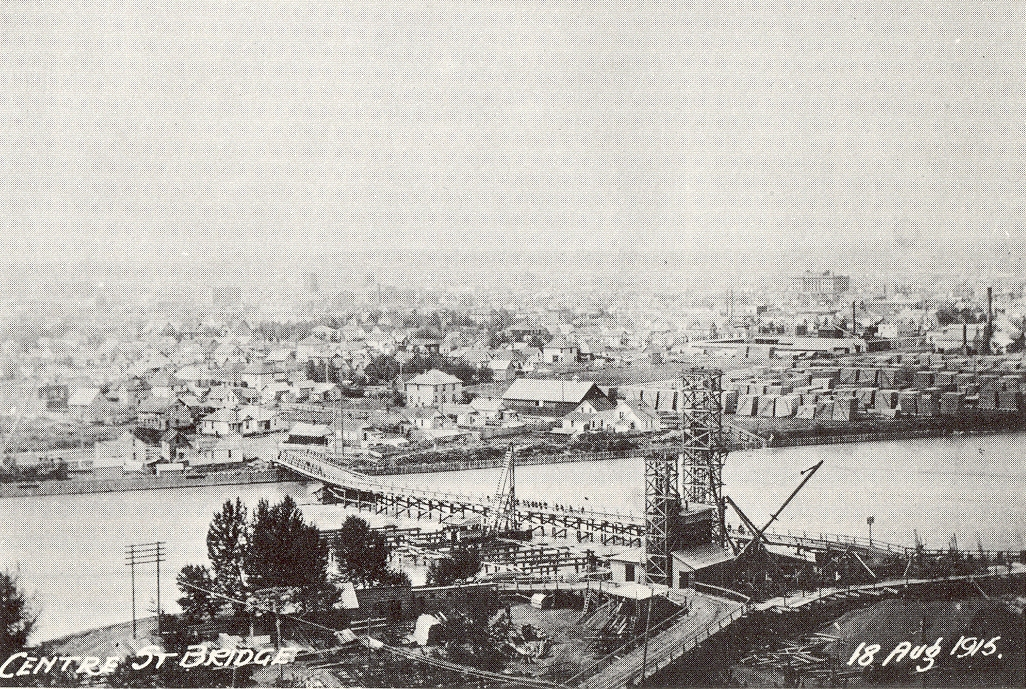
Centre Street Bridge under construction in 1915

It was built by The City of Calgary in 1916 for $375,000. It replaced the MacArthur Bridge, a steel truss bridge built in 1907 by a land developer called the Centre Street Bridge Company Limited The MacArthur Bridge was destroyed by a flood in 1915. Centre Street Bridge was designed by John F. Greene, and features an upper and lower deck, cantilevered balconies on the upper deck, and four large cast concrete lions atop two pairs of ornamental concrete pavilions flanking each end of the bridge. The lions were cast by Scottish mason James L. Thomson. They were modelled after the bronze lions by Landseer at the base of Nelson's Column in Trafalgar Square, London. The pavilions are ornamented with symbols of Canada and the United Kingdom: buffalo heads, maple leaves, shamrocks (Ireland), roses (England), and thistles (Scotland).

The upper deck, a reinforced concrete arch structure, spans 178 meters (584 ft) and is 15 meters (49 ft) wide. The lower deck, an "I" girders structure, runs for 150 meters (490 ft) and is 5.5 meters (18 ft) wide.

The Centre Street Bridge was listed as a Municipal Historic Resource for Calgary in 1992.

The bridge went through extensive restoration in 2001, when it was closed for one year. The lower deck is configured with reversible lanes. The original lions were replaced with replicas after considerable debate. Local legends of adjacent Chinatown hold that the lions would come alive after dark and roam the city streets. One of the original lions is now located at City Hall, the remaining three were placed in long-term storage. In April 2013, a city committee voted unanimously to place the remaining lions at one or more of the new West LRT C-Train (tram) stations. In 2018, one of original lions was repaired, conserved and is now displayed in Rotary Park. The remaining two lions are in storage to protect and preserve them for foreseeable future.

== Other information ==
The lower deck of the bridge has a clearance of only 2.7 metres (8.9 ft). Inattentive drivers get their trucks, RVs, and vans stuck on the narrow 2-lane lower deck of the bridge, blocking traffic. An advanced warning system was installed on the bridge approaches in 2010, cutting the number of incidents in half, but roughly 20 vehicles a year continue to get stuck.

The opening scene of the 2001 Steven Seagal movie Exit Wounds was filmed on the bridge.

== See also ==
- Transportation in Calgary
- List of bridges in Calgary
- List of bridges in Canada

== Gallery ==
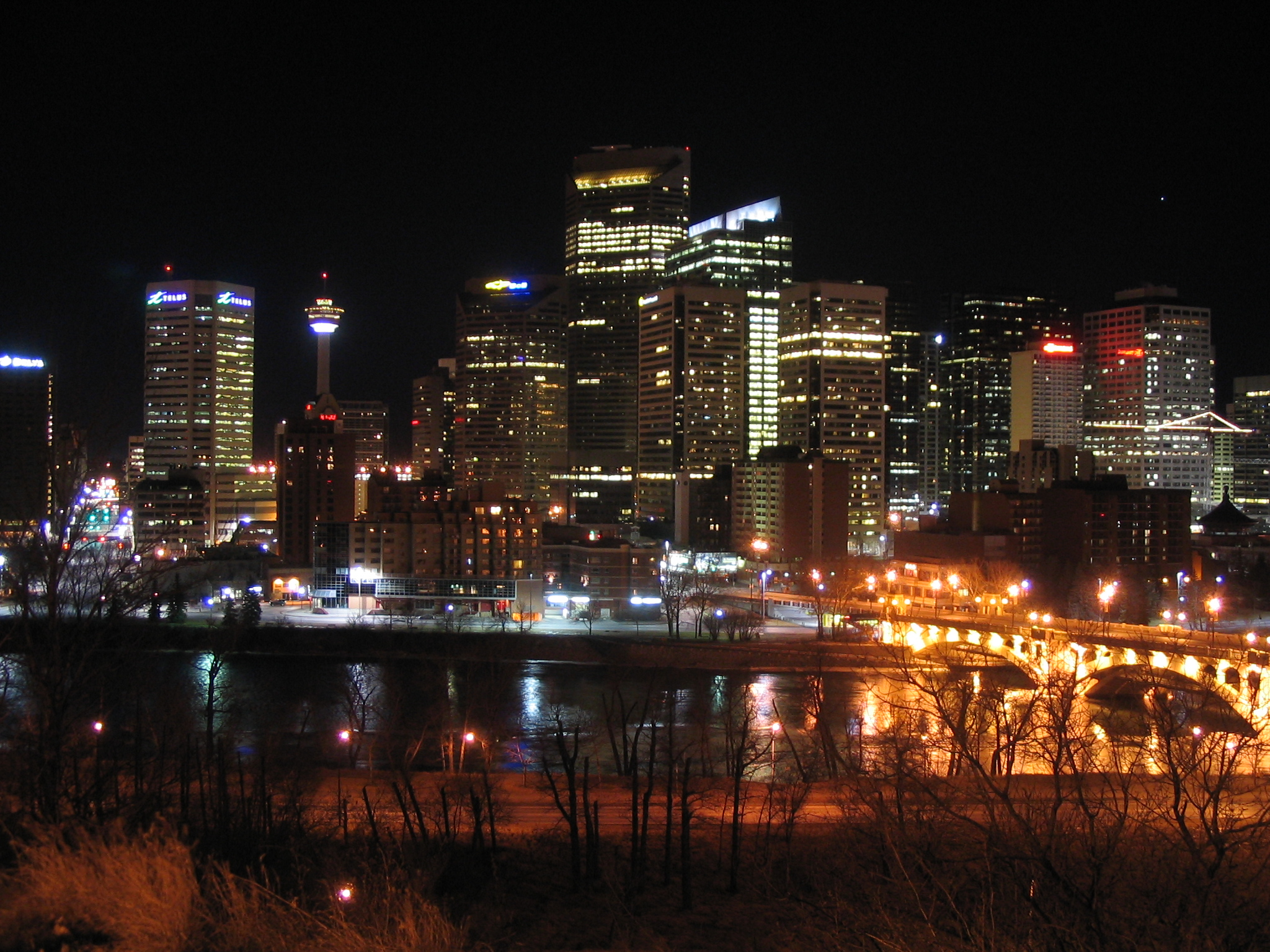
Centre Street Bridge and Downtown Calgary at night

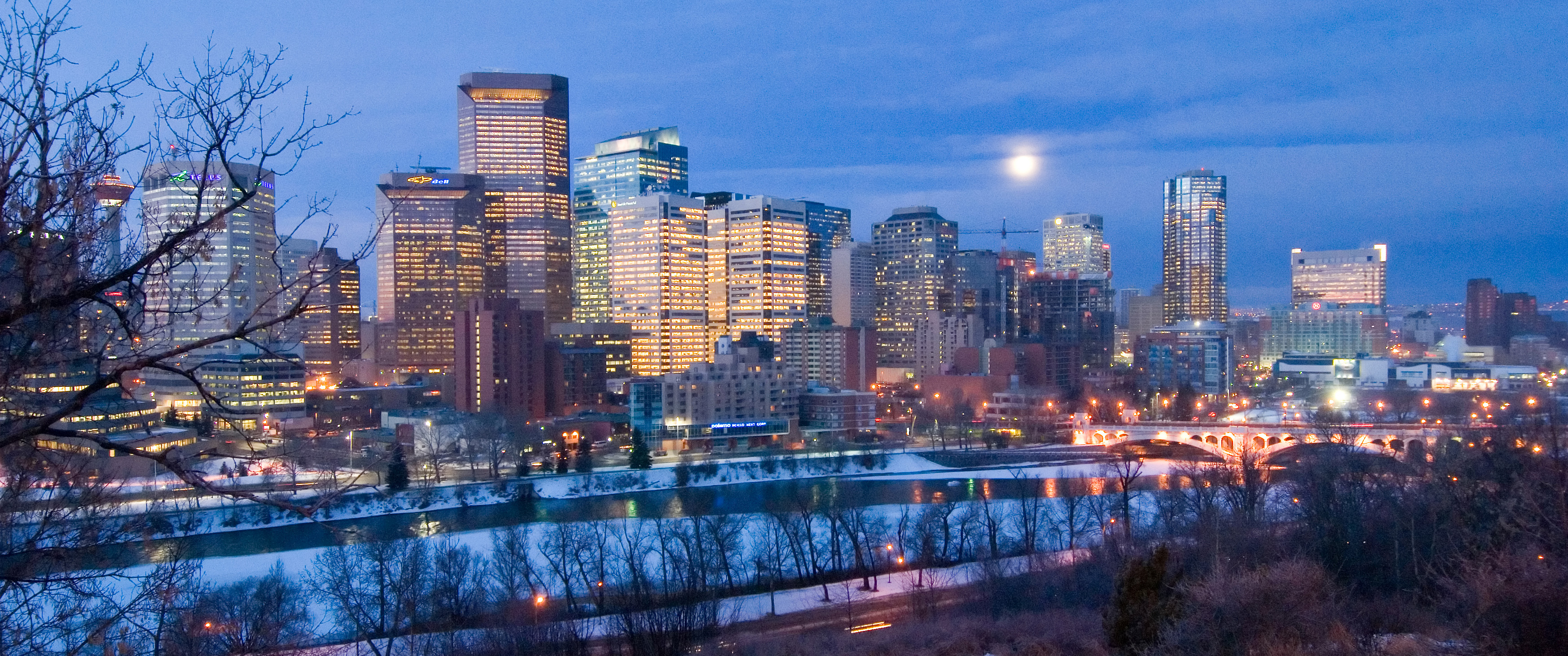
Centre Street Bridge with frozen Bow River

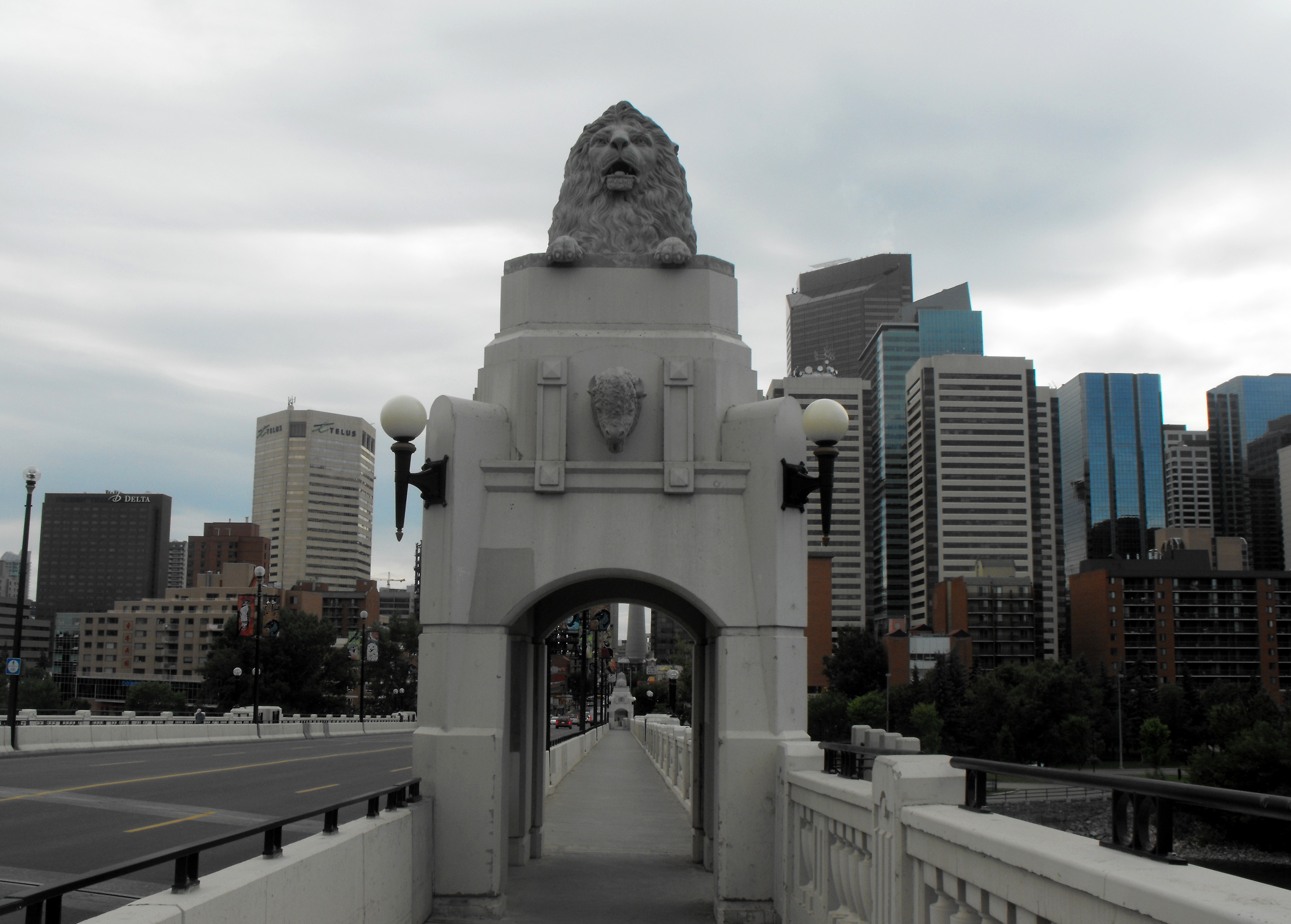
Lion
