= Sun Princess =

Sun Princess may refer to:

- Sun Princess (ship), various ships
- Sun Princess (horse), a Thoroughbred racehorse
- Sun Princess, the title given to the second place winner of the Sun and Salsa Festival pageant

== See also ==
- Princess Sun, Northern Yan empress
