= Alyth (disambiguation) =

Alyth is a village in Scotland.

Alyth may also refer to:

- Alyth (singer), also known as Alyth McCormack, from the Isle of Lewis, Scotland
- Alyth Shul, or North Western Reform Synagogue, a Reform synagogue in London, England
- Alyth/Bonnybrook/Manchester, Calgary, a neighbourhood in Calgary, Alberta, Canada
