= Louise Bridge =

Bridge in Calgary, Alberta, Canada

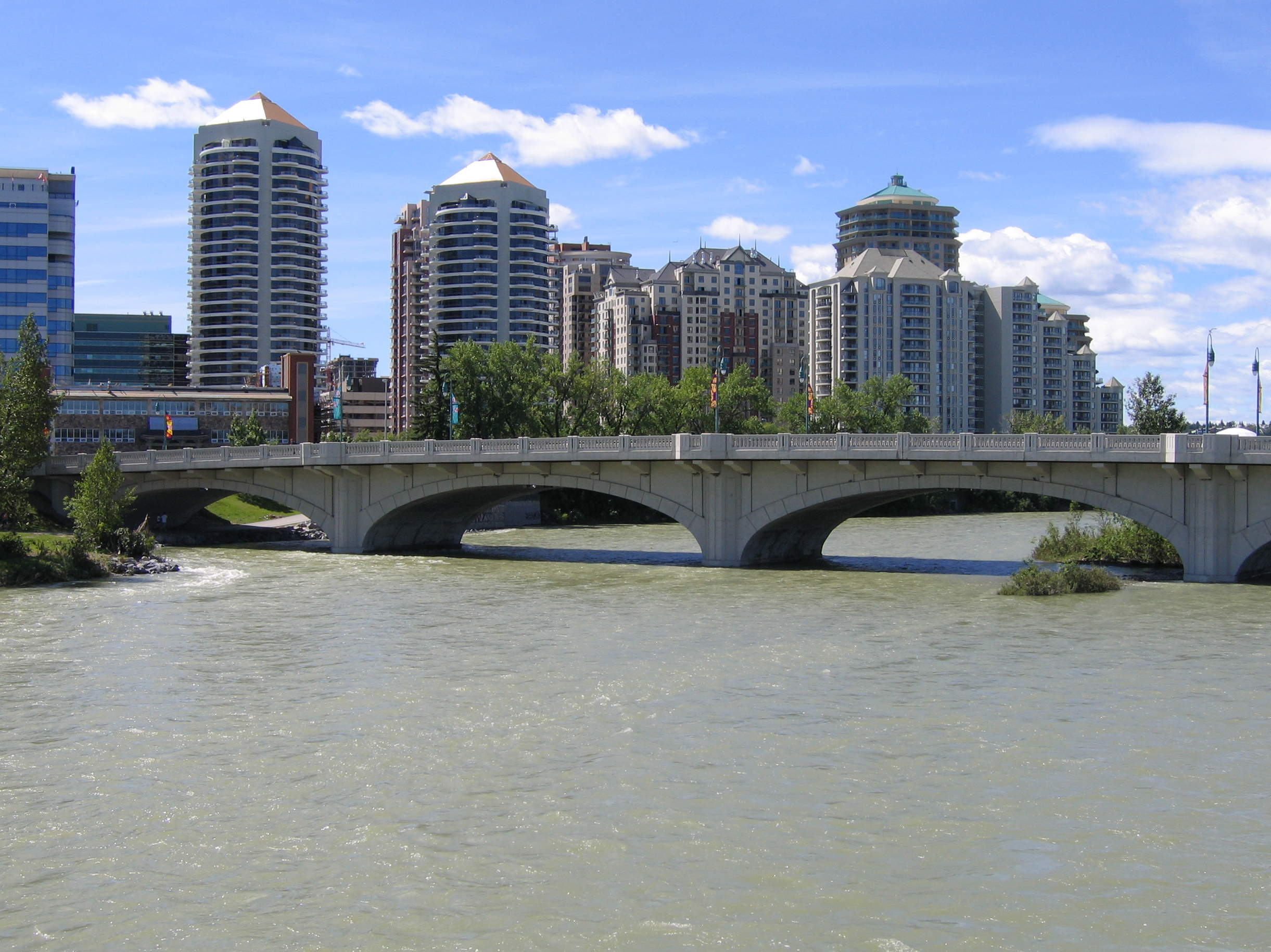
- Louise Bridge and Downtown West End
- Coordinates: 51.05116°N 114.08490°W
- Carries: 4 lanes of 10th Street SW, pedestrians
- Crosses: Bow River
- Locale: Calgary
- Maintained by: City of Calgary

Characteristics
- Total length: 172 meters (564 ft)
- Width: 19.6 meters (64 ft)
- Piers in water: 4

History
- Opened: 1921

Statistics
- Daily traffic: 16,000 (2022)

Location
- Interactive map of Louise Bridge

The Louise Bridge crosses the Bow River in Calgary, Alberta, Canada.

The bridge connects Downtown West End with Memorial Drive and Kensington. It is configured with reversible lanes to accommodate higher traffic into Downtown during the early morning hours, and higher outbound traffic during the afternoon commute.

== History ==
The bridge was built in 1921 and originally it carried street car and pedestrian traffic. It was named after Louise Cushing, daughter of William Henry Cushing, Calgary mayor from 1900 to 1901.

The bridge was rehabilitated in 1995, with a design conceived by Simpson Roberts Wappel, at a cost of $5.1 million.

== Design ==
The bridge is a reinforced concrete structure built on five wall arched spans. It has a length of 172 meters (564 ft), with each span measuring 32 meters (105 ft). The total width of the bridge is 19.6 meters (64 ft).

== See also ==
- List of bridges in Calgary
- List of bridges in Canada
