= Reconciliation Bridge =

Bridge in Calgary, Alberta, Canada

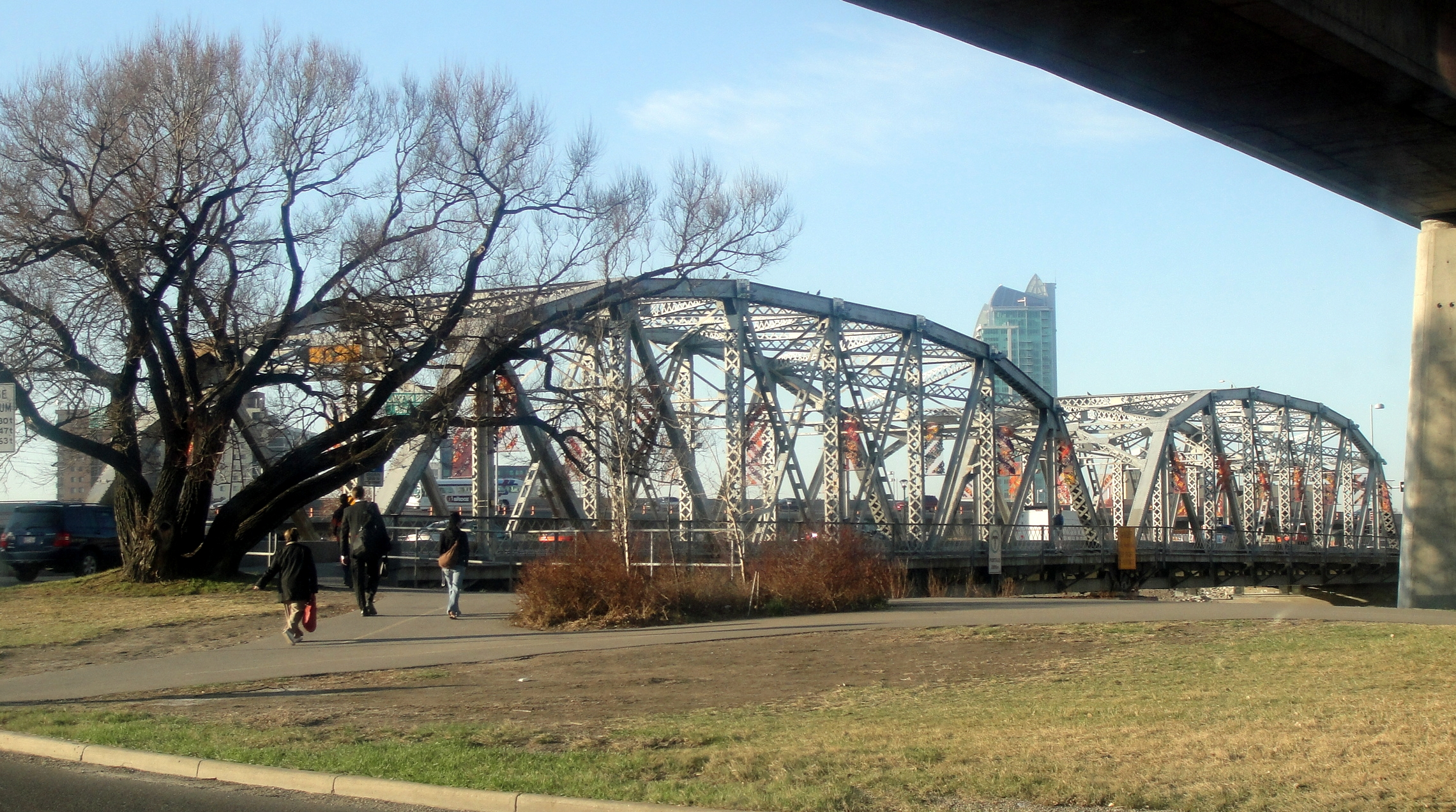
- Reconciliation Bridge in 2010
- Coordinates: 51.04995°N 114.05219°W
- Carries: Edmonton Trail
- Crosses: Bow River
- Locale: Calgary
- Other name(s): 4th Street NW Bridge; Langevin Bridge (1910-2017)
- Maintained by: City of Calgary

Characteristics
- Material: Steel and Concrete
- No. of spans: 2

History
- Construction end: 1909
- Opened: 1910

Statistics
- Daily traffic: 11,000 (2022)

Location
- Interactive map of Reconciliation Bridge

The Reconciliation Bridge (formerly the Langevin Bridge) is a through truss bridge in Calgary, Alberta, Canada. It connects Downtown Calgary with north-central Calgary communities such as Bridgeland and Crescent Heights, by spanning the Bow River between 4th Avenue South and Memorial Drive. The bridge is part of the Bow River pathway system.

On January 23, 2017, Calgary City Council voted to change the name from Langevin Bridge to the Reconciliation Bridge.

== History ==
The bridge was opened in 1910 and was named for Sir Hector-Louis Langevin, one of the Fathers of the Canadian Confederation. The original span carries southbound 4th Street traffic across the river. A second span, a Box girder bridge built in 1972 carrying northbound traffic on 5th Street (Edmonton Trail NE), is also referred to as Langevin Bridge.

In 2009, the Calgary Municipal Land Corporation set up 5,600 programmable lights on the bridge for Christmas, at a cost of $400,000, as a part of Downtown East Village re-vitalization efforts. The LED installation is composed of 5600 LED grouped in 156 programmable light assemblies, and is part of the RiverWalk project, an effort to improve the pathways along the Bow and Elbow rivers adjacent to the East Village. The Reconciliation Bridge is located at 4th Street NE and Riverfront Avenue SE.

The bridge was renamed after a majority vote at Calgary city council on Monday, January 23, 2017, with the new bridge being named the Reconciliation Bridge. On May 26, 2018, the bridge was officially renamed in a ceremony. The event included elders and youth to inspire healing and advance reconciliation efforts.

== See also ==
- Transportation in Calgary
- List of bridges in Calgary
- List of bridges in Canada
- George C. King Bridge
