= Ben Calf Robe =

Member of the Siksika Nation

- Died: August 11, 1958
- Children: Ed Calf Robe (son)
- Relatives: Noran Calf Robe (grandson)

Ben Calf Robe was a Blackfoot (Siksika) elder, residential school survivor, and scout for the North West Mounted Police (and later the RCMP).

== Calgary Stampede ==
Calf Robe liaised with Calgary Stampede founder Guy Weadick on the inaugural event in 1912, and was invited to camp at the Indian Village. The Calf Robe family tipi has been an annual mainstay since.

== Namesakes ==
- Ben Calf Robe Society, a social services organization in Edmonton, Alberta.
- Ben Calf Robe - St. Clare, an elementary & junior high school in Edmonton, Alberta
- Ben Calf Robe Annual Traditional Pow wow, a social gathering held in the springtime in Edmonton, Alberta since 1981
- Calf Robe Bridge, a Bow River crossing in Calgary, Alberta
