= Ramsay, Calgary =

Ramsay
- Neighbourhood
- Location of Ramsay in Calgary
- Coordinates: 51°02′11″N 114°02′38″W
- Country: Canada
- Province: Alberta
- City: Calgary
- Quadrant: SE
- Ward: 9
- Established: 1914

Government
  - Administrative body: Calgary City Council

Area
  - Total: 0.9 km^{2} (0.35 sq mi)
- Elevation: 1,065 m (3,494 ft)

Population (2006)
  - Total: 2,039
  - Median Income (2000): $43,716
- Time zone: UTC-7 (Mountain Time Zone)
- Area code: area code 403
- Website: Ramsay Community Association

Ramsay is a residential neighbourhood in the southeast quadrant of Calgary, Alberta. It is an inner city community, located east of the Elbow River, Macleod Trail, Stampede Grounds and the Scotiabank Saddledome arena and south of Inglewood. To the southeast, it borders the Alyth-Bonny Brook industrial area. The eastern half of the community consists primarily of older homes and there is an industrial area in the most eastern corner of the community.

The area now known as Ramsay was developed in the 1880s by Wesley Fletcher Orr and his partners. It was named Ramsay in 1956 when residents of Burnsland, Brewery Flats, Grandview and Mills Estate consolidated as a new community. It was named for William Thomson Ramsay (1857-1921), an early land agent and property owner. It is represented in the Calgary City Council by the Ward 9 councillor. The community has an area redevelopment plan in place.

In 2020, Calgary City Council approved the construction of Inglewood/Ramsay Station, part of the Calgary Green Line. The station will be elevated over 12 Street SE alongside the freight tracks, near the intersection of 11 Avenue SE / 12 Street SE. Construction will begin early 2021.

== Demographics ==
In the City of Calgary's 2012 municipal census, Ramsay had a population of 2,110 living in 1,132 dwellings, a 5.2% increase from its 2011 population of 2,006. With a land area of 0.8026 km^{2} (0.3099 sq mi), it had a population density of 2,100/km^{2} (5,500/sq mi) in 2012.

Residents in this community had a median household income of $43,716 in 2000. As a reference, the median household income for the whole city of Calgary was approximately 30% greater: $57,879.

The low income residents living in the neighbourhood represented 19.5% of its total population. As of 2000, 15.1% of the residents were immigrants. A proportion of 31% of the buildings were condominiums or apartments, and 46.9% of the housing was used for renting.

Pop. Overtime
Year	Population
2014	2,157
2015	2,201
2016	2,116
2017	2,110
2018	2,187
2019	2,158
2021	2,155

== Crime ==
Crime Data
Year	Crime Rate (/100 pop.)
2018	4.3
2019	3.9
2020	2.9
2021	3.0
2022	3.7
2023	2.7

== Education ==
The community is served by the Ecole Ste. Anne Elementary, Junior & Senior (Calgary Catholic School District), Ramsay Elementary public school and Janus Academy, a private school for children and youth with Autism Spectrum Disorder.

== See also ==
- List of neighbourhoods in Calgary
