= Edmonton Trail =

Street in Calgary, Alberta, Canada

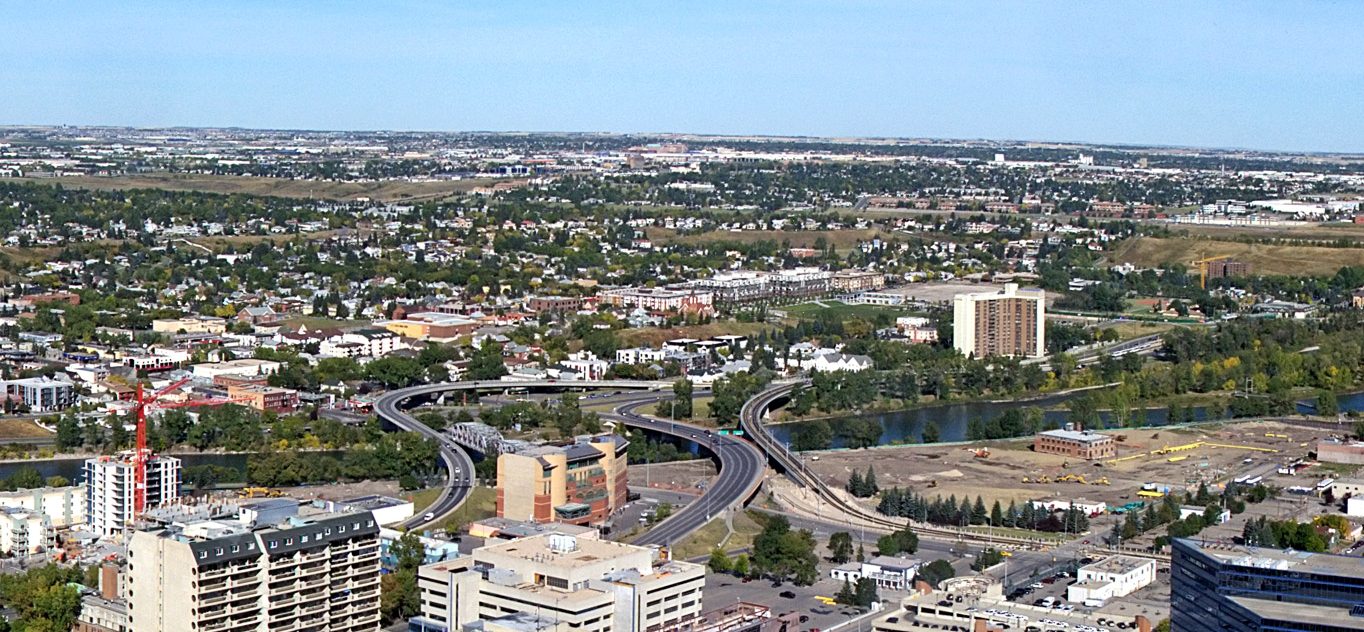
- Edmonton Trail starts at the Reconciliation Bridge and 5th Avenue Flyover
- Interactive map of Edmonton Trail
- Maintained by: City of Calgary
- Length: 5.4 km (3.4 mi)
- Location: Calgary
- South end: Reconciliation Bridge
- Major junctions: Memorial Drive; 16 Avenue NE (Highway 1)
- North end: McKnight Boulevard

Edmonton Trail is a major north-south arterial road in the northeast quadrant of Calgary, Alberta. The road connects Downtown Calgary from Reconciliation Bridge (formerly called the Langevin Bridge) and the 5th Avenue Flyover at Memorial Drive with north-central Calgary. Between Memorial Drive and 16 Avenue NE (and to a lesser degree up to 24 Avenue NE), Edmonton Trail is lined with restaurants and retail businesses.

== History ==
The road is the remnant of the southern terminus of the Calgary and Edmonton Trail, a land transport route between the fur trading posts of Fort Edmonton and Fort Calgary, used as far back as the early 1800s. The more modern trail was blazed by John Alexander McDougall in 1873 as far as Morley and extended to Calgary two years later. The northern terminus, called Calgary Trail, is a partial freeway in south Edmonton.

The street lies in the heart of the Italian community of Calgary, being the location of the first Italian lodge and Italian school of Calgary in the 1920s. Many Italian restaurants and stores still line the street.

== Route description ==
The southern terminus is divided from the Bow River and Memorial Drive, with a southbound one-way road along the 4 Street NE alignment, and a northbound one-way road along the 5 Street NE alignment (the northbound section is signed as Edmonton Trail). The spurs re-unite at 3 Avenue NE, and continue as a two-way road northwards between the communities of Bridgeland and Crescent Heights. It then crosses 16 Avenue NE (Highway 1 / Trans-Canada Highway), continues between the communities of Winston Heights and Tuxedo Park. North of the 32 Avenue NE, it passes through a light industrial district, then ends at McKnight Boulevard. It is continued for a short stretch to the north by 4 Street NE into the community of Thorncliffe.

== Major intersections ==
From south to north. The entire route is in Calgary.

km	mi	Destinations	Notes
0.0	0.0	4 Avenue SE / 5 Avenue SE	One-way couplets; westbound (southbound) traffic continues on 4 Avenue SE; eastbound (northbound) traffic continues from 5 Avenue SE
0.0	0.0	Crosses the Bow River; 5th Avenue Flyover (northbound) and Reconciliation Bridge (southbound)	
0.1	0.062	Memorial Drive	Northbound traffic follows Edmonton Trail; southbound traffic follows 4 Street NE.
0.4	0.25	1 Avenue NE	
0.7	0.43	4 Street NE	One-way transition; becomes two-way traffic; U-turn ramp
1.2	0.75	8 Avenue NE	
1.7	1.1	12 Avenue NE	
2.0	1.2	16 Avenue NE (Highway 1)	
2.5	1.6	20 Avenue NE	
3.7	2.3	32 Avenue NE	
4.1	2.5	36 Avenue NE	
4.6	2.9	41 Avenue NE, 32 Avenue NE Connector	
5.4	3.4	McKnight Boulevard 4 Street NE	Continues north as 4 Street NE
1.000 mi = 1.609 km; 1.000 km = 0.621 mi: Incomplete access

== See also ==
- Transportation in Calgary
