= Sun and Salsa Festival =

Festival in Calgary, Alberta (1993–2014)

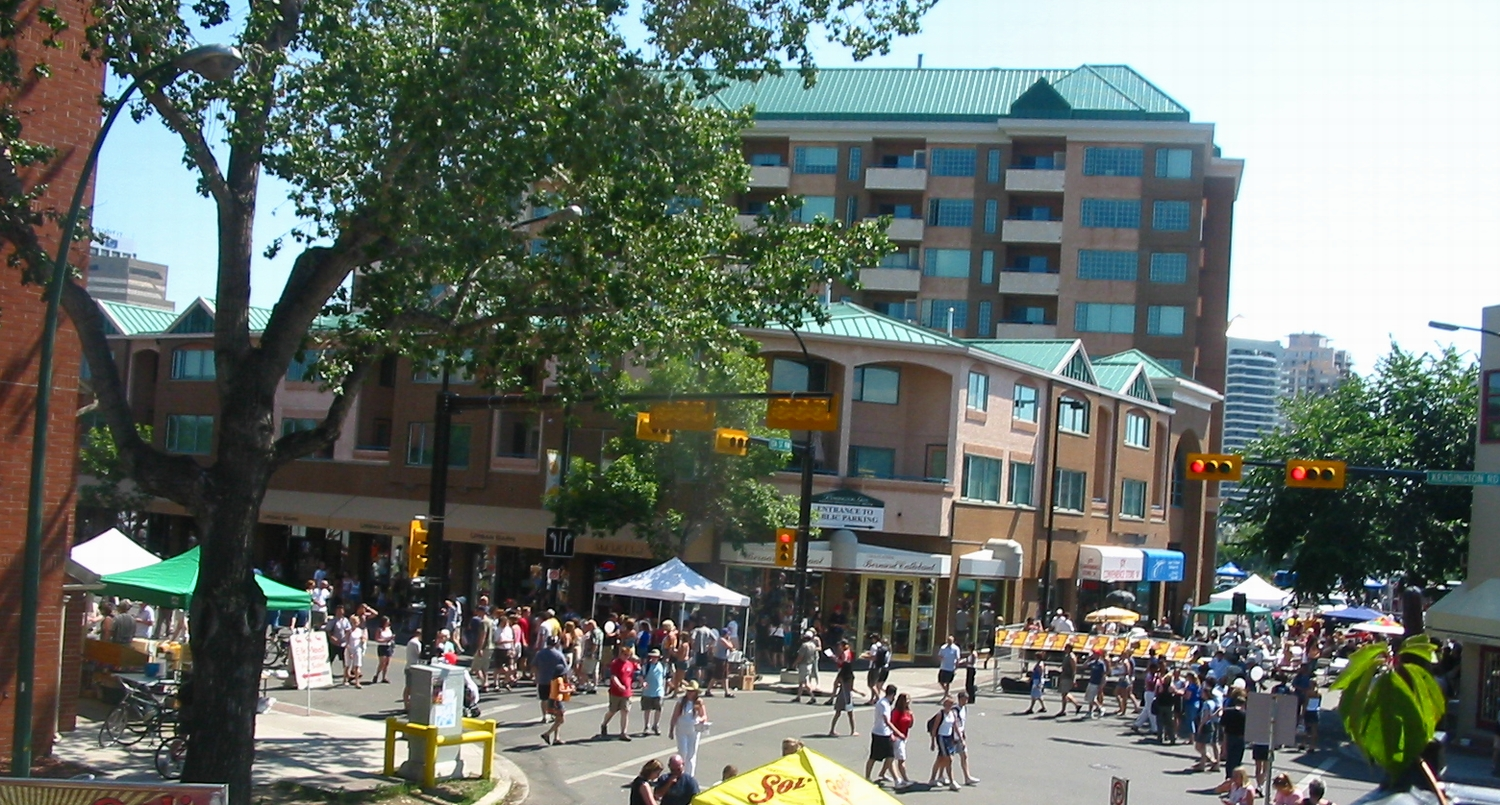
- Kensington during the 2004 Sun and Salsa Festiva
- Genre: Food festival, fundraising
- Dates: Mid July
- Locations: Kensington, Calgary
- Years active: 1993-2014
- Founded: 1993
- Website: Sun and Salsa

The Sun and Salsa Festival was an annual festival put on in the Kensington Business Revitalization Zone (BRZ) of Calgary, Alberta. It took place along 10 Street and Kensington Road, which both have parts closed off to traffic. Attendance at the festival has grown to around 100,000 in 2010. In 2015, organisers announced that the festival would be cancelled due to construction developments in the community, citing sidewalks, trees, and streetlights upgrades as key factors. Since then, the festival has been under an indefinite hiatus.

== Features ==
The festival features a competition for the best Salsa, Best Presentation Salsa & Most Creative Salsa. It has a variety of merchant booths (food and merchandise). It includes a fashion show to showcase the area's fashion retailers. As well it includes various entertainment, such as musical acts and dancing, on multiple stages. The festival serves as a fundraiser for its charities, which as of 2010, are the Brenda Strafford Centre and Brown Bagging for Calgary's Kids.

== Miss Sun and Salsa Pageant ==
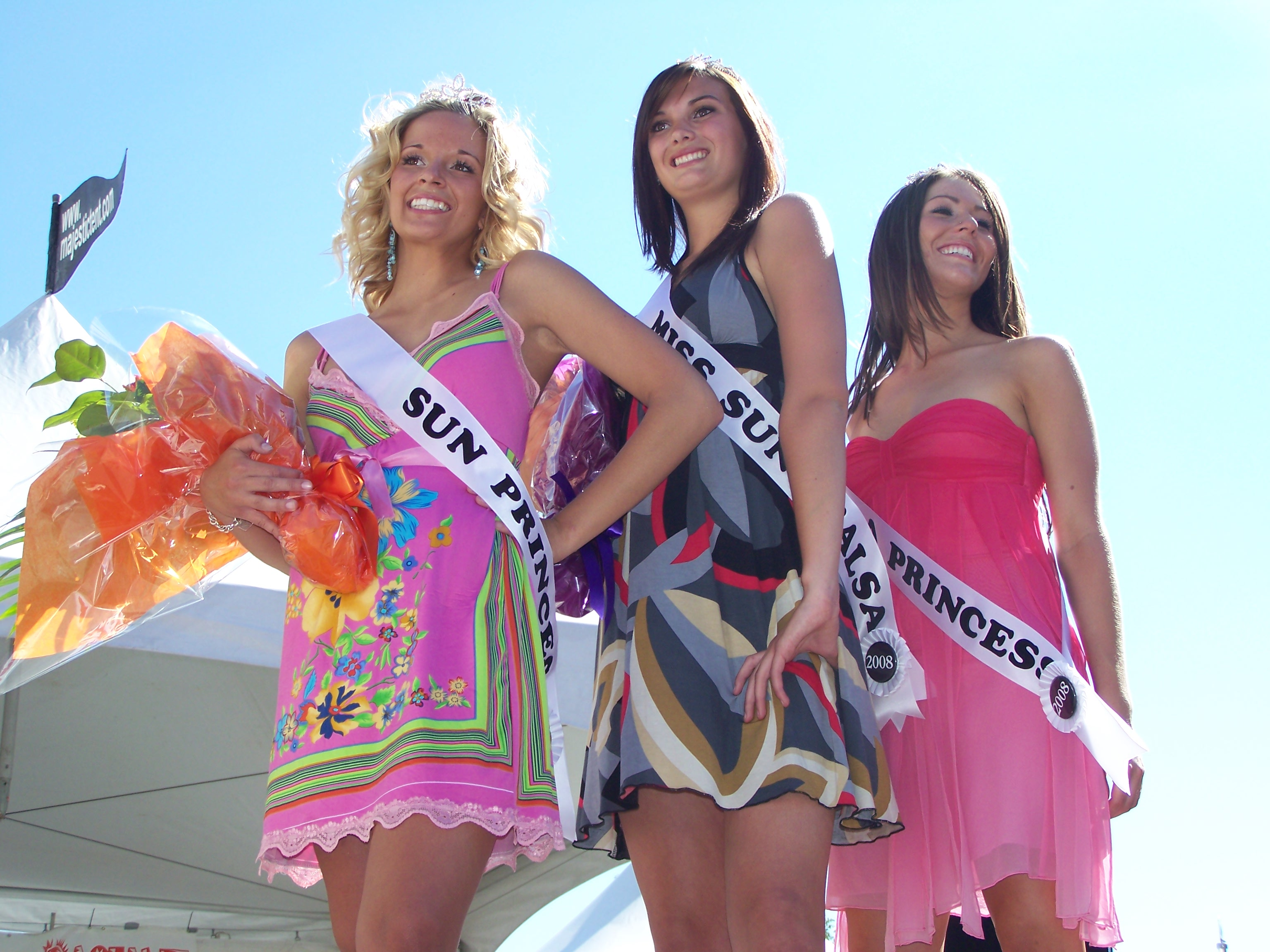
The winning trio at the 2008 Miss Sun and Salsa Pageant (left to right): Sun Princess Nicole Tomas, Miss Sun and Salsa Hannah Coskey, and Salsa Princess Kelsi Vescarelli

From 2005 to 2011 the festival featured the Miss Sun and Salsa Pageant. Each year, it selected a "Miss Sun and Salsa", "Sun Princess" and "Salsa Princess" to promote the Kensington community and the festival. They represented the festival around the year, inside and outside of Calgary.
