= Memorial Drive (Calgary) =

Road in Calgary

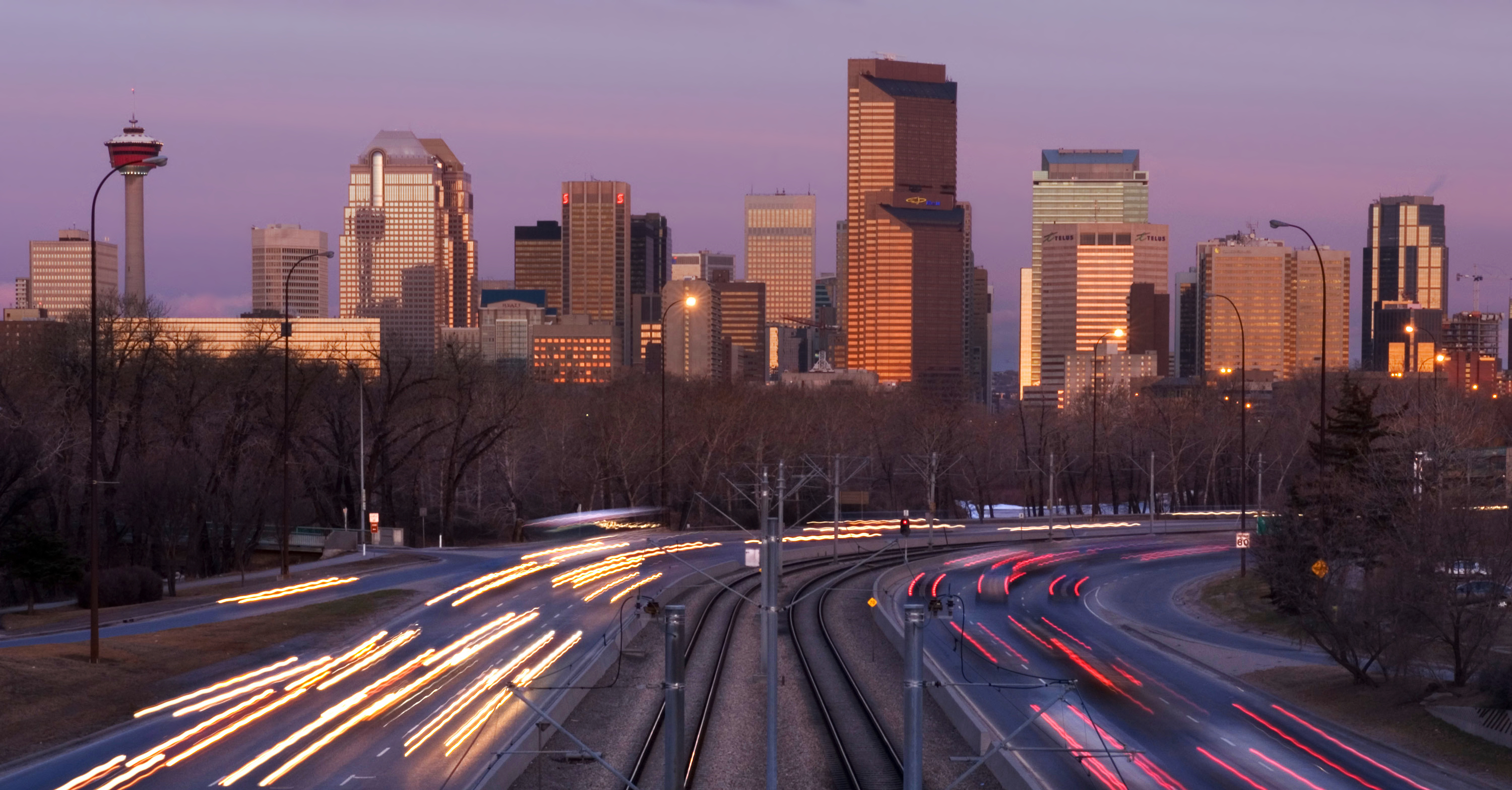
- Memorial Drive seen from the Zoo bridge
- Maintained by: City of Calgary
- Length: 14 km (8.7 mi)
- Location: Calgary
- West end: Crowchild Trail
- Major junctions: 10 Street NW; Centre Street; Edmonton Trail; Deerfoot Trail (Highway 2); Barlow Trail; 36 Street E; 52 Street E; 68 Street E
- East end: Abbeydale Drive

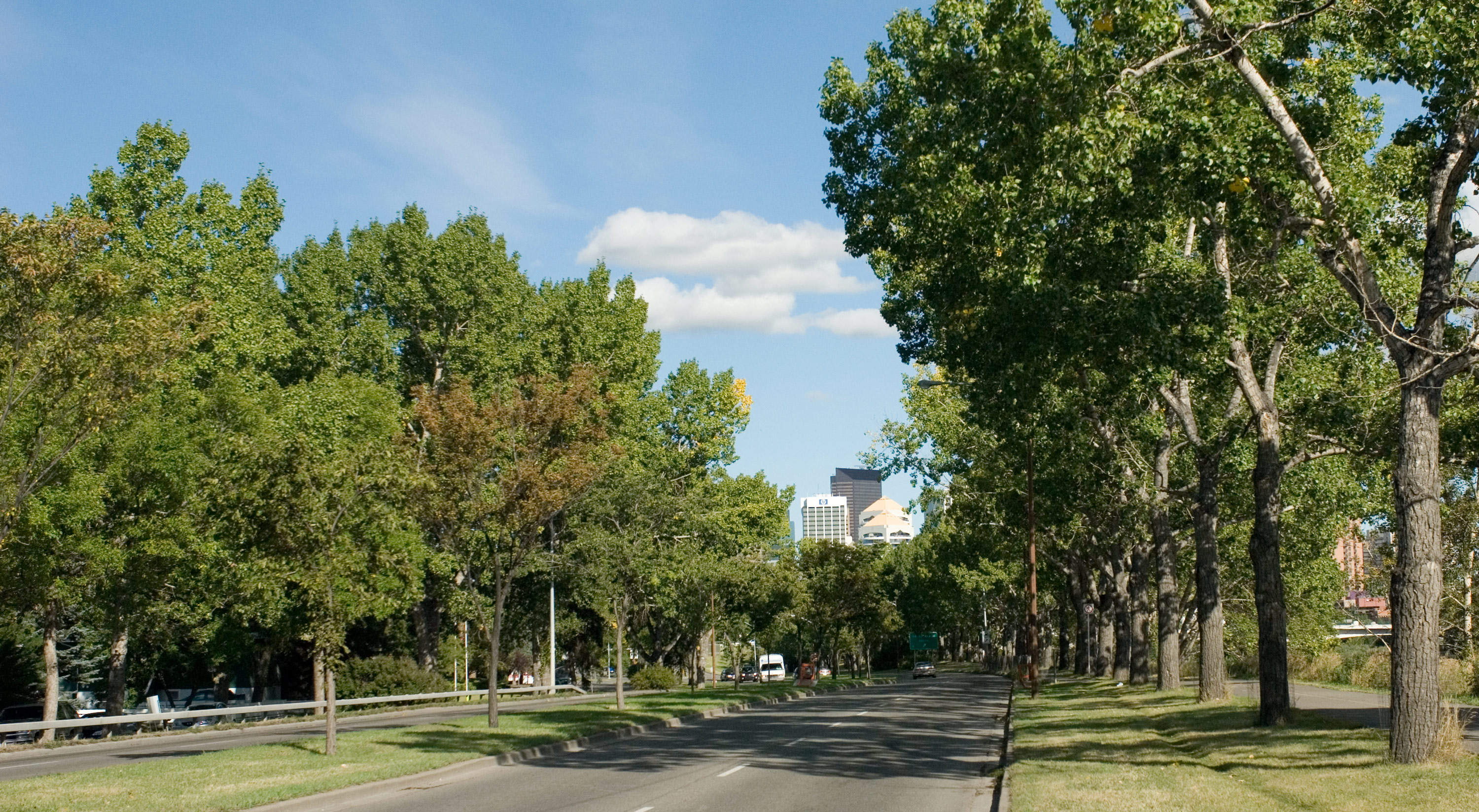
Memorial Drive looking east from 17 St NW

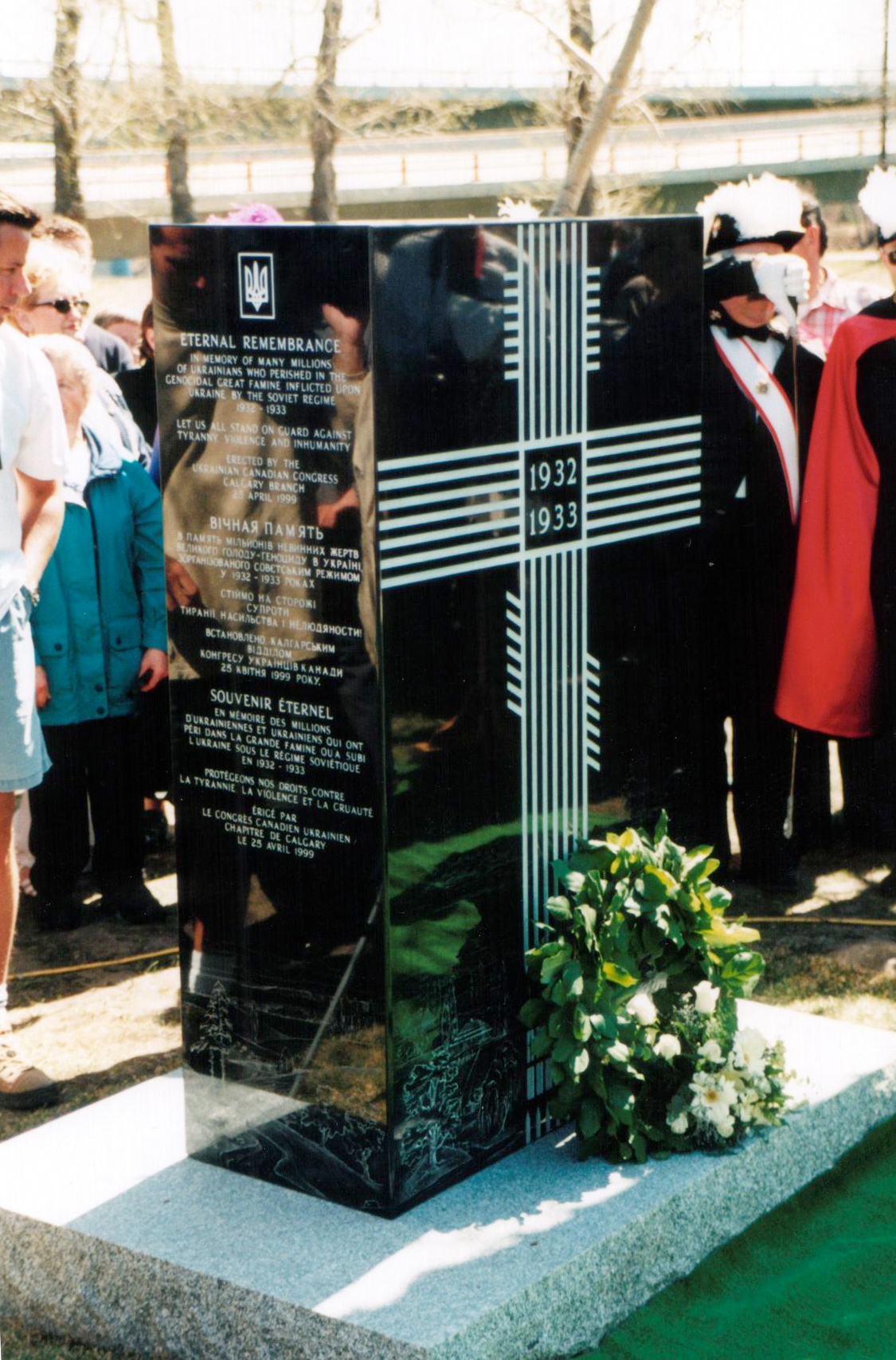
Ihor Novosilets' Holodomor Monument near Memorial Drive (Calgary) at Edmonton Trail, Dedication: "Eternal Remembrance. In memory of many millions of Ukrainians who perished in the genocidal great famine inflicted upon Ukraine by the Soviet Regime 1932-1933. "Let us all stand on guard against tyranny, violence and inhumanity."

Memorial Drive (formerly Sunnyside Boulevard) is a major road in Calgary, Alberta. Aside from its important role in city infrastructure, the tree lined sides of Memorial Drive serve as a living testament to the many local soldiers who died during World War I and give it a parkway look on the western section. An active path system also runs along the south side of Memorial Drive, beside the banks of the Bow River. The Calgary Soldiers' Memorial forms part of an extensive renovation to Memorial Drive, which heightens the function of the road as a monument to the city's military. The Landscape of Memory Project began in 2004, in order to revitalize a nine kilometre stretch of the road. The design incorporated "Poppy Plaza" at the corner of Memorial Drive and 10th Street NW. The plaza used "weathered steel" to create large gateways, and the plaza and adjacent river walk were lined with the same rusted metal into which quotes about the Canadian experiences of war were cut. The Peace Bridge was incorporated into the remembrance theme of Memorial Drive, though there are no explanatory plaques at the site of the bridge.

Memorial Drive officially begins at an interchange with Crowchild Trail in the northwest, serving as an eastern extension of Parkdale Boulevard (which, along with 3 Avenue NW, is an extension of the arterial connector Bowness Road), though the signage at 16 Avenue NW shows eastbound Bowness Road as Memorial Drive. The road continues east as a divided parkway until it passes the dual-intersection with 4 Street NE and Edmonton Trail at which point it becomes a freeway until Deerfoot Trail, where it downgrades to an at-grade expressway. Westbound traffic is offered a flyover into downtown at the 4th/Edmonton intersection. At this point the C-Train runs along the median of the split road, beginning with the Bridgeland/Memorial Station. After passing Barlow Trail, the road downgrades to a major arterial with the C-Train turning north along 36 Street E/Métis Trail after the Franklin Station. Memorial is then downgraded to traffic signalized intersections and continues east to 68th Street N.E., where it downgrades once again to a residential street for its last few blocks to its present terminus at Abbeydale Drive.

City planners have made provisions for Memorial Drive to eventually connect with Stoney Trail. East of 36 Street E, Memorial Drive serves as the boundary between the Northeast and Southeast quadrants of the city.

== Major intersections ==
From west to east. The entire route is in Calgary.

km	mi	Destinations	Notes
−3.4– −3.0	−2.1– −1.9	Bowness Road 16 Avenue NW (Highway 1) / Shaganappi Trail	Partially grade-separated; Bowness Road continues west
−2.3	−1.4	37 Street NW	Bowness Road east end; 3 Avenue NW west end
−1.7	−1.1	32 Street NW	3 Avenue NW east end; Parkdale Boulevard west end
−1.3	−0.81	29 Street NW	Access to Foothills Medical Centre and Alberta Children's Hospital
−0.65	−0.40	Kensington Road	Alternate access to Crowchild Trail
0.0	0.0	Crowchild Trail	Grade separated; Parkdale Boulevard east end; Memorial Drive west end
0.7	0.43	19 Street NW	At-grade; no eastbound exit
1.5	0.93	14 Street W	Grade separated; eastbound to southbound exit, northbound to westbound entrance.
2.2	1.4	10 Street NW	Access to Downtown Calgary via Louise Bridge
4.2	2.6	Centre Street Bridge (lower deck)	Access to Chinatown and Downtown Calgary; no access to Centre Street (upper deck)
5.0	3.1	4 Street NE	Southbound one-way; access to Downtown Calgary via Reconciliation Bridge; becomes 4 Avenue SW
5.1	3.2	Edmonton Trail	Northbound one-way; west end of expressway
5.3	3.3	4 Avenue SW – City Centre	4th Avenue Flyover; westbound exit only; C-Train enters median
5.9	3.7	9 Street NE	Westbound right in/right out
5.9	3.7	Bridgeland/Memorial station (located in median)	
6.5	4.0	St. Georges Drive – Wilder Institute/Calgary Zoo, Telus Spark	Diamond interchange
6.9	4.3	Zoo station (located in median)	
7.5	4.7	Deerfoot Trail (Highway 2) – Airport	Split diamond interchange (traffic signals); Hwy 2 exit 256
8.0	5.0	19 Street NE	Westbound right-in/right-out; access via Barlow Trail ramps
8.4	5.2	Barlow/Max Bell station (located in median)	
8.7	5.4	Barlow Trail	Partial cloverleaf interchange
9.2	5.7	Franklin station (located in median)	
9.6	6.0	28 Street SE	
10.0	6.2	33 Street NE	Westbound exit only; C-Train exits median
10.3	6.4	36 Street E	East end of expressway; access to Marlborough Mall
10.7	6.6	Marlborough Way, 39 Street SE	Alternate access to Marlborough Mall
11.2	7.0	44 Street E	
12.2	7.6	52 Street E	
13.6	8.5	68 Street E	
13.9	8.6	Abbeydale Drive	
1.000 mi = 1.609 km; 1.000 km = 0.621 mi: Incomplete access; Route transition

== See also ==
- Transportation in Calgary
