= Calgary and Edmonton Trail =

Land transport route in Canada

The Calgary and Edmonton Trail was a land transport route between Fort Edmonton and Fort Calgary in the Northwest Territories.

Prior to European contact, there was already a route through the area that local Indigenous peoples used to travel between the Shortgrass Prairies in the south to the Aspen Parkland in the north. This was reportedly a link in the Great North Trail (AKA Old North Trail) that stretched from Mexico to the Barren Lands, a western equivalent to the Great Trail along the eastern seaboard.

After the fur trade post Fort Edmonton was established near the site of today's Fort Saskatchewan near to today's City of Edmonton, pre-existing Native trails became part of the massive fur-trading transportation network that European and Canadian companies used to export furs from the interior to the coasts and on to Europe. David Thompson traveled the northern portion of the trail to Fort Edmonton in 1800. John McDougall blazed a more modern trail running south of Edmonton as far as Morley in 1873. It was extended to Calgary two years later. In 1885 the Alberta Field Force travelled north on the road to secure Red Deer, Lacombe and Edmonton from feared Native uprising. Development of the trail allowed mail service between Calgary and a southside location near to Edmonton in 1891.

== Name and namesakes ==
Alberta Highway 2 is now the main route between Edmonton and Calgary. Most of it bears the name "Queen Elizabeth II Highway", but some sections are named in honour of the old trail, as are other roads running along the same axis.

Heading south from Edmonton, the trail was called "Calgary Trail". Calgary Trail now refers to the southbound portion of Highway 2 within the boundaries of the city of Edmonton.

Heading north from Calgary, the trail bore the name "Edmonton Trail". That name now refers to a north–south feeder road in Calgary approximately 1 km west of the current Highway 2 and approximately 0.25 km east of Centre Street North. A segment of the old trail through the city of Airdrie is also called Edmonton Trail.

== See also ==
- Calgary and Edmonton Railway
