= Elbow Park, Calgary =

Elbow Park
- Neighbourhood
- Location of Elbow Park in Calgary
- Coordinates: 51°01′24″N 114°05′01″W
- Country: Canada
- Province: Alberta
- City: Calgary
- Quadrant: SW
- Wards: Calgary City Council#Ward 8, 11
- Established: 1910
- Annexed: 1907

Government
  - Mayor: Jeromy Farkas
  - Administrative body: Calgary City Council
  - Councillors: Nathaniel Schmidt (Independent) Rob Ward (Communities First)

Area
  - Total: 0.8 km^{2} (0.31 sq mi)
- Elevation: 1,070 m (3,510 ft)

Population (2006)
  - Total: 3,471
  - Average Income: $135,081
- Website: Elbow Park Community Association

Elbow Park is an affluent residential neighbourhood in the southwest quadrant of Calgary, Alberta. It is one of the oldest and wealthiest communities in the city. It is bordered to the south and east by Elbow River, to the east by Elbow Drive, to the north by Council Way and to the west by 14 Street W.

Elbow Park was annexed to the City of Calgary in 1907 and developed after 1910, when it was established as a neighbourhood. It is represented in the Calgary City Council by the Ward 8 and 11 councillors.

River Park and Stanley Park, developed in the Elbow River valley, border the community.

== Demographics ==
In the City of Calgary's 2012 municipal census, Elbow Park had a population of 3,377 living in 1,221 dwellings, a -0.9% increase from its 2011 population of 3,408. With a land area of 1.8 km^{2} (0.69 sq mi), it had a population density of 1,880/km^{2} (4,860/sq mi) in 2012.

Residents in this community had a median household income of $135,081 in 2000, and there were 7.7% low income residents living in the neighbourhood. As of 2000, 11.1% of the residents were immigrants. Most buildings were single-family detached homes, and 4% of the housing was used for renting.

== Education ==
The community is served by Elbow Park Elementary and William Reid Bilingual Elementary public schools. Elbow Park Elementary School was founded in 1926.

== Parks ==
The main park in Elbow Park is located between 8A ST SW to 7 ST SW and 35 Ave SW to 34 Ave SW. Facilities include a playground, skating rink and tennis courts. Community events are held here including the annual Movie in the Park night for fundraising and are administered by the Elbow Park Community Association.

== See also ==
- List of neighbourhoods in Calgary
