= Sun Princess (ship) =

A number of ships have been named Sun Princess including:

- MS Sun Princess (1974) a cruise ship launched in 1972, she served under this name from 1974 until 1988
- MS Sun Princess (1995), a cruise ship launched in 1995, she served under this name until 2020
- MS Sun Princess (2024), a cruise ship launched in 2023 and commenced sailing in 2024
