= CPKC Alyth Yard =

Railway facility in Calgary, Canada

Coordinates: 51°01′27″N 114°01′08″W

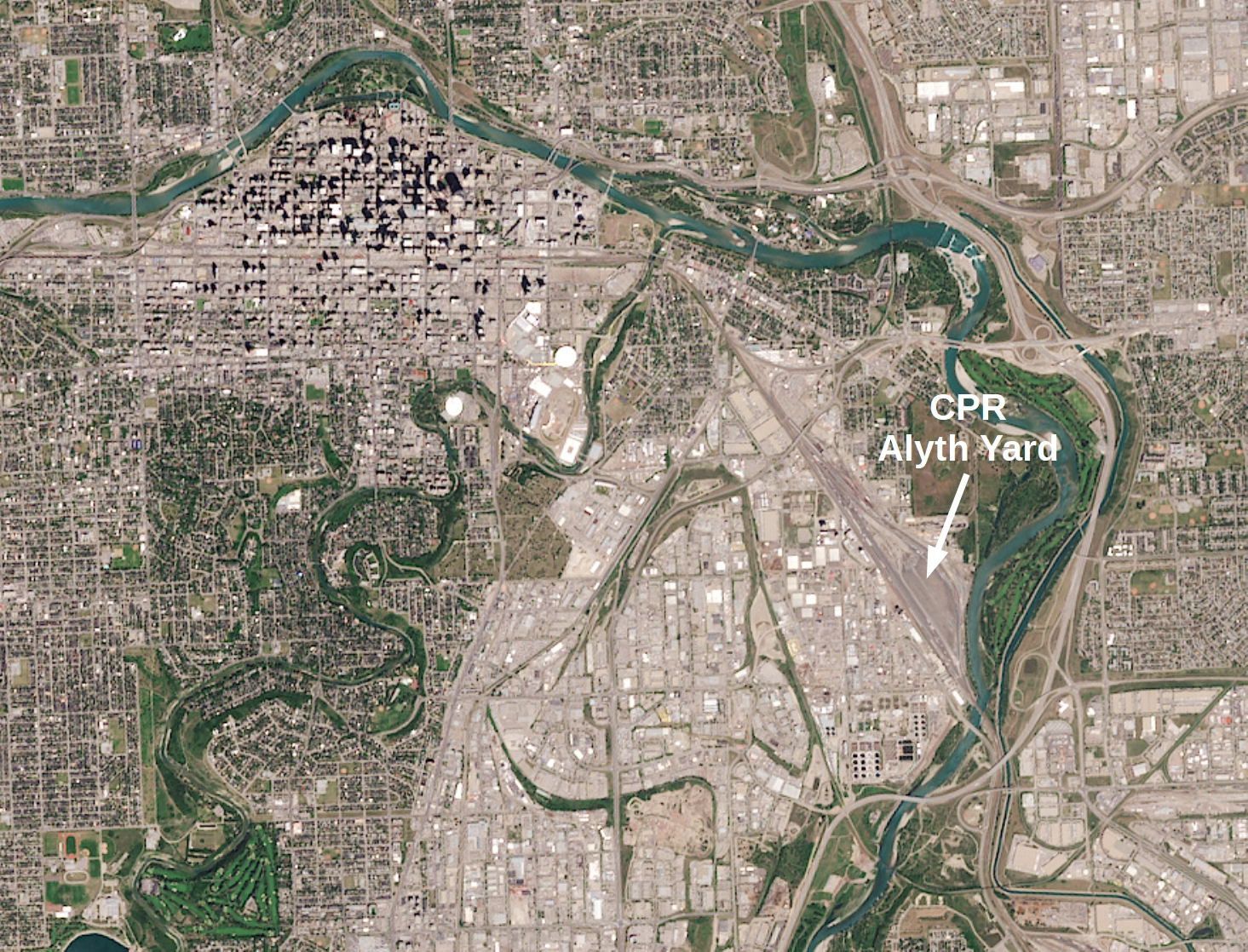
CPKC Alyth Yard in Calgary

CPKC Alyth (Calgary) Yard is a 168-acre (0.68 km^{2}) Class 1 railway facility in the neighbourhood of Alyth, southeast of downtown Calgary, Alberta. One of Canadian Pacific Kansas City's main marshalling yards in Canada, it primarily serves as a rail car repair shop and diesel locomotive servicing facilities on site.

The yard is CPKC's busiest in Western Canada and is home terminal to crews operating north to Red Deer, Alberta, and west to Field, British Columbia, through the Spiral Tunnels.

The hump classification yard facility has been removed, and trains are now made up by switching within the yard.

Alyth Yard is designed to handle approximately 2200 rail cars at 100% capacity, and is supported by satellite yards in Ogden Park and the Calgary Intermodal Facility at Shepard.

== See also ==
- Facilities of the Canadian Pacific Railway
