= Kensington, Calgary =

Business Improvement Area in Calgary, Canada

Coordinates: 51°03′09″N 114°05′41″W

Location of Kensington in Calgary

Kensington is a Business Revitalization Zone (BRZ) in Calgary, Alberta, focused around the intersection of Kensington Road and 10th St. NW, also known as the Kensington-Louise Crossing Business Association. It is located in the communities of Hillhurst and Sunnyside, immediately north of downtown and the Bow River, and is easily reached by most of the city's major access routes.

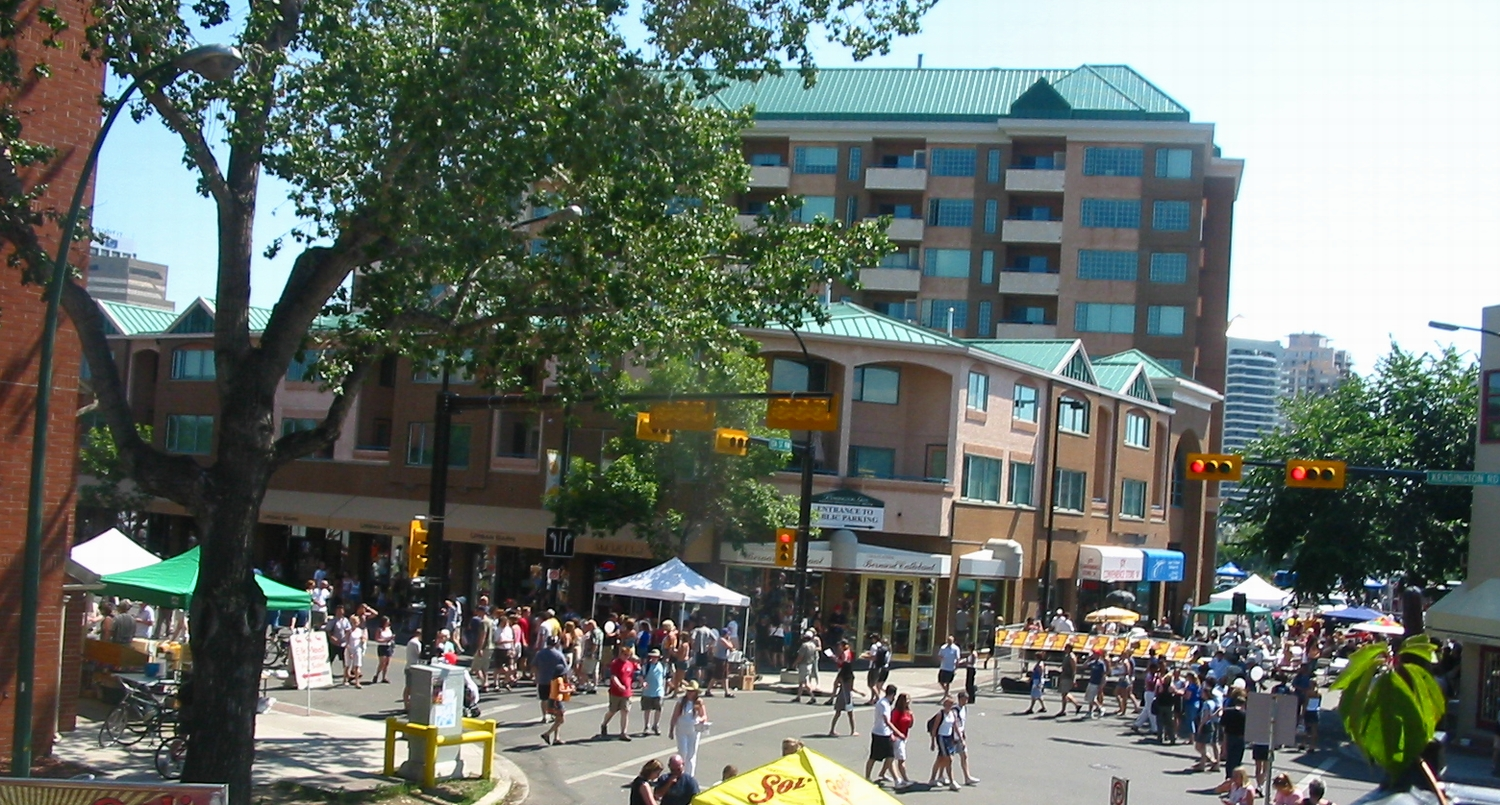
Kensington during the Sun and Salsa Festival

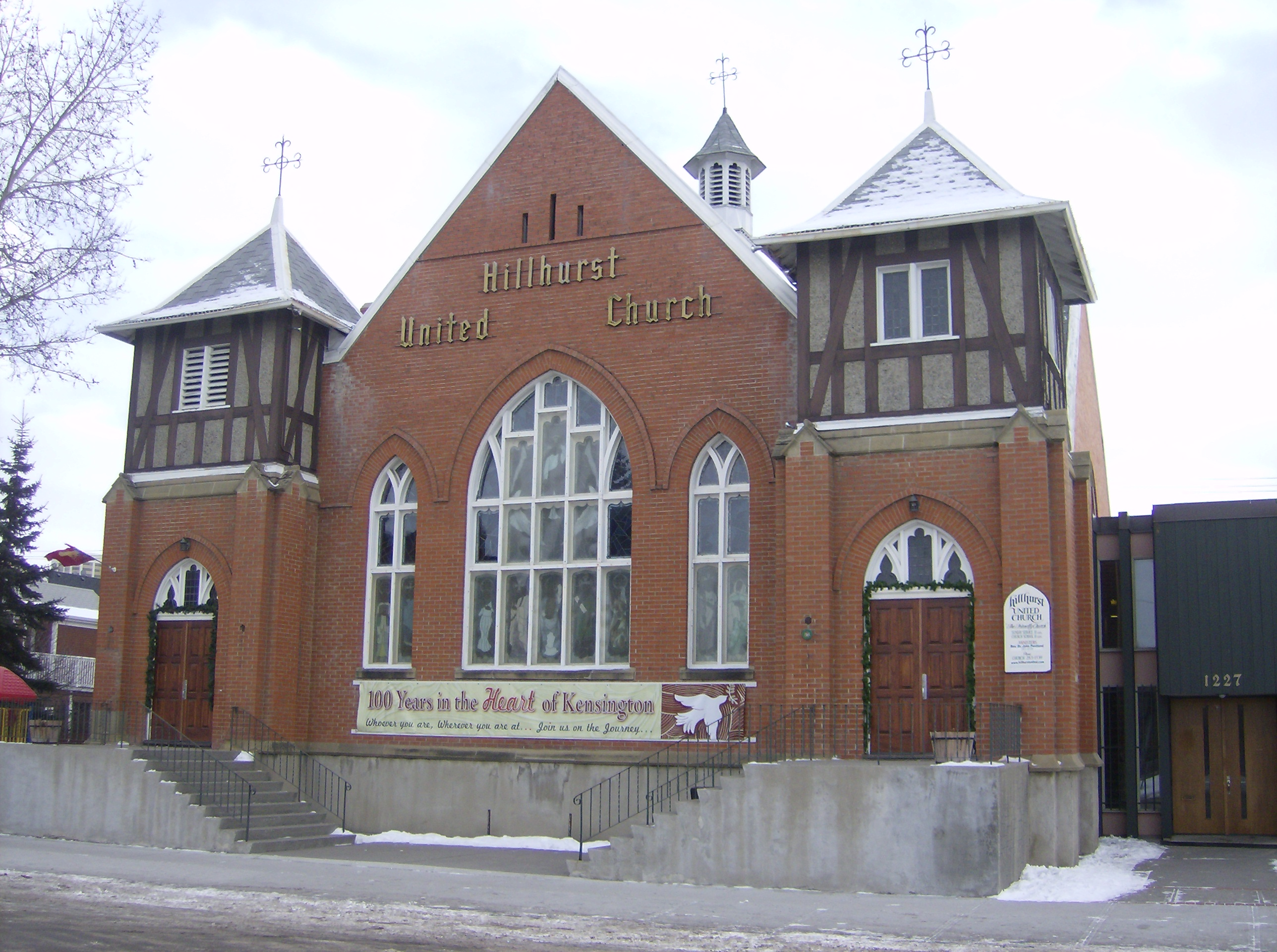
Hillhurst United Church on Kensington Close

The Calgary C-Train (above ground light-rail transit system) runs through the Kensington area via Sunnyside Station. The station is located along 9A Street, between 3rd and 4th Avenue N.W.

Kensington is a lively area with many independent shops, restaurants and pubs.

The BRZ hosts Christmas in Kensington Village in December, the Sun and Salsa Festival in July, as well as the Bizarre Bikes & Bazaar in May.

== History ==
The surrounding Hillhurst area was owned by the Canadian Pacific Railway and pioneer rancher Ezra Riley at the beginning of the 20th century, when Riley Park was used for horse pasture. The oldest commercial buildings still standing date from before the First World War.

== Diagon Alley In Kensington ==
In 2017 and 2018 businesses in the Kensington area transformed themselves into shops replicating those seen in Diagon Alley from the Harry Potter series. The event takes place in July and is open to the public for free.

== Popularity ==
Within the City of Calgary, Kensington is an area that houses over 200 businesses and services, in addition to a significant number of historical sites. This makes Kensington both a popular inner city district for many local Calgarians, as well as popular destination for shopping and accessing trendy and niche services within the city. Much of this popularity is generated not only by the shops and services, but by the popular and trendy restaurants that are situated within the district.

== See also ==
- List of neighbourhoods in Calgary
