= Crescent Heights, Calgary =

Crescent Heights
- Neighbourhood
- Location of Crescent Heights in Calgary
- Coordinates: 51°03′48″N 114°03′45″W
- Country: Canada
- Province: Alberta
- City: Calgary
- Quadrant: NE, NW
- Ward: 7
- Established: 1914
- Annexed: 1911

Government
  - Mayor: Jeromy Farkas
  - Administrative body: Calgary City Council
  - Councillor: Myke Atkinson (Independent)

Area
  - Total: 1.63 km^{2} (0.63 sq mi)
- Elevation: 1,080 m (3,540 ft)

Population (2006)
  - Total: 6,082
  - Density: 3,731.3/km^{2} (9,664/sq mi)
  - Average Income: $43,123
- Website: Crescent Heights

Crescent Heights is a neighbourhood (formerly its own village) located in Calgary, Alberta. It is located in the inner city, immediately north from Downtown. It is bounded to the north by the Trans-Canada Highway, on the east by Edmonton Trail, on the west by 4th Street NW, and to the south by Memorial Drive and the Bow River.

Crescent Heights was originally incorporated as a village on May 1, 1908. It was subsequently annexed by the City of Calgary in 1911 and established as a neighbourhood in 1914.

Crescent Heights is represented in the Calgary City Council by the Ward 7 councillor. The community has an area redevelopment plan in place.

The community will be linked to the city's CTrain light rail system at 9 Avenue N station when construction of the Green Line's planned northern expansion is complete.

== History ==
Crescent Heights was founded in 1895 by Archibald J. McArthur. Crescent Heights, originally its own village, was acquired by land developer and politician Archibald J. McArthur and incorporated into the City of Calgary in 1909 along with the neighbouring community of Tuxedo Park, slightly further north. Crescent Heights experienced a real estate boom in the 1920s and many new homes were built, some of which are still standing today.

== Demographics ==
Crescent Heights is a community in Calgary, Alberta, characterized by a population of 6,240 residents living in private households as of the 2021 Census of Canada. The age distribution of the population includes 10% of individuals aged 14 years or younger and 12% aged 65 years or older. Economic data indicates that 28% of households spend 30% or more of their total income on shelter, with a median total household income before tax of $72,500 in 2020. The community is notably diverse, with 26% of its residents being immigrants and 83% of individuals primarily speaking English at home. This demographic and household information was sourced from Statistics Canada and accessed through the Community Data Program.

Pop. Overtime
| Year | Population |
|---|---|
| 2014 | 6,235 |
| 2015 | 6,380 |
| 2016 | 6,097 |
| 2017 | 6,197 |
| 2018 | 6,598 |
| 2019 | 6,620 |
| 2021 | 6,240 |

== Crime ==
Crime Data
| Year | Crime Rate (/100 pop.) |
|---|---|
| 2018 | 5.6 |
| 2019 | 6.4 |
| 2020 | 6.5 |
| 2021 | 4.9 |
| 2022 | 5.9 |
| 2023 | 4.8 |

== Education ==
Crescent Heights is home to Crescent Heights High School. Due to a shortage of high schools in northeast Calgary, Crescent Heights had a proportion of students bused in from Abbeydale, Taradale, Saddletowne, Marlborough, Marlborough Park and surrounding areas in the 1980s and 1990s, as well as in present times.

== See also ==
- List of former urban municipalities in Alberta
- List of neighbourhoods in Calgary
