= Chinatown, Calgary =

Chinatown
- Neighbourhood
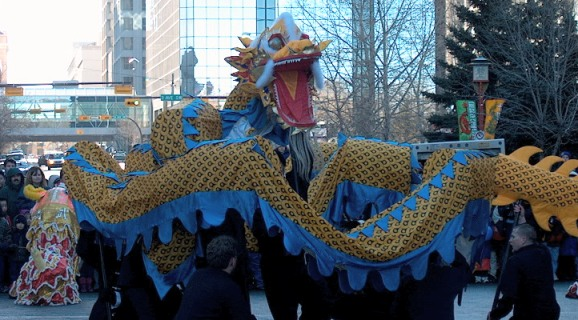
- Dragon dance in Calgary's Chinatown

- Location of Chinatown in Calgary
- Coordinates: 51°03′03″N 114°03′54″W
- Country: Canada
- Province: Alberta
- City: Calgary
- Quadrant: SE
- Ward: 7

Government
  - Mayor: Jeromy Farkas
  - Administrative body: Calgary City Council
  - Councillor: Myke Atkinson (Independent)

Area
  - Total: 0.179 km^{2} (0.069 sq mi)
- Elevation: 1,045 m (3,428 ft)

Population (2021)
  - Total: 2,250
  - Average Income: $16,174

Calgary's Chinatown is a district of Calgary located along Centre Street in the southeast area of Downtown Calgary immediately west of the Downtown East Village. Calgary's Chinese Cultural Centre, with its traditional architecture and decor (styled after the Temple of Heaven in Beijing), is the largest facility of its kind in North America. It serves the Chinese community of Calgary and provides educational and cultural programs for the wider community and its visitors. The Dragon City Mall and Sien Lok Park (a Chinese cultural park located on the south Bow River pathway) are also located in this district.

Harmony Park is located on the border of Chinatown at 115 4 Ave. S.W. It was formerly named James Short Park in honor of a turn-of-the-century school principal and alderman who led opposition to the establishment of Calgary's Chinatown in the early 1900s, and was renamed in 2022 as part of the city's efforts to become more inclusive.

The area along Centre Street north of downtown and continuing for several blocks is also very Asian-influenced and is often thought of as the city's second Chinatown. International Avenue is also a major multi-ethnic centre in the city's southeast with considerable Asian influence.

As of 2024, Chinatown has an area redevelopment plan called "Tomorrow's Chinatown" that is intended to "support Chinatown's future as a vibrant, culturally rich place for people to live, visit, work and do business."

== Dragon City Mall ==
Chinatown features a small 2 story mall called Dragon City Mall, it is located on Centre Street near 4 Avenue SE.

== History ==
After the completion of the Canadian Pacific Railway, some Chinese railway laborers settled in Calgary, with some migrating there and others because they could not return home after the Government of Canada reneged on a promise to provide transportation home after the railway was finished. From 1885 to 1888, five Chinese businessmen established Chinese laundries on Stephen Avenue, and a Chinese community began to be established around them.

Smallpox arrived in Calgary in June 1892 when a Chinese resident was found with the disease, and by August nine people had contracted the disease with three deaths. Calgarians placed the blame for the disease on the local Chinese population, resulting in a riot on August 2, 1892. Local authorities razed the laundry in which he was living and placed the occupants in quarantine outside the town. When authorities released four of the quarantined subjects in August, a mob descended on the town's Chinese-owned laundries, smashing windows and attempting to burn the structures to the ground. The local police did not attempt to intervene. Mayor Alexander Lucas had inexplicably left town during the riot, and when he returned home he called in the North West Mounted Police to patrol Calgary for three weeks to prevent further riots.

== Demographics ==
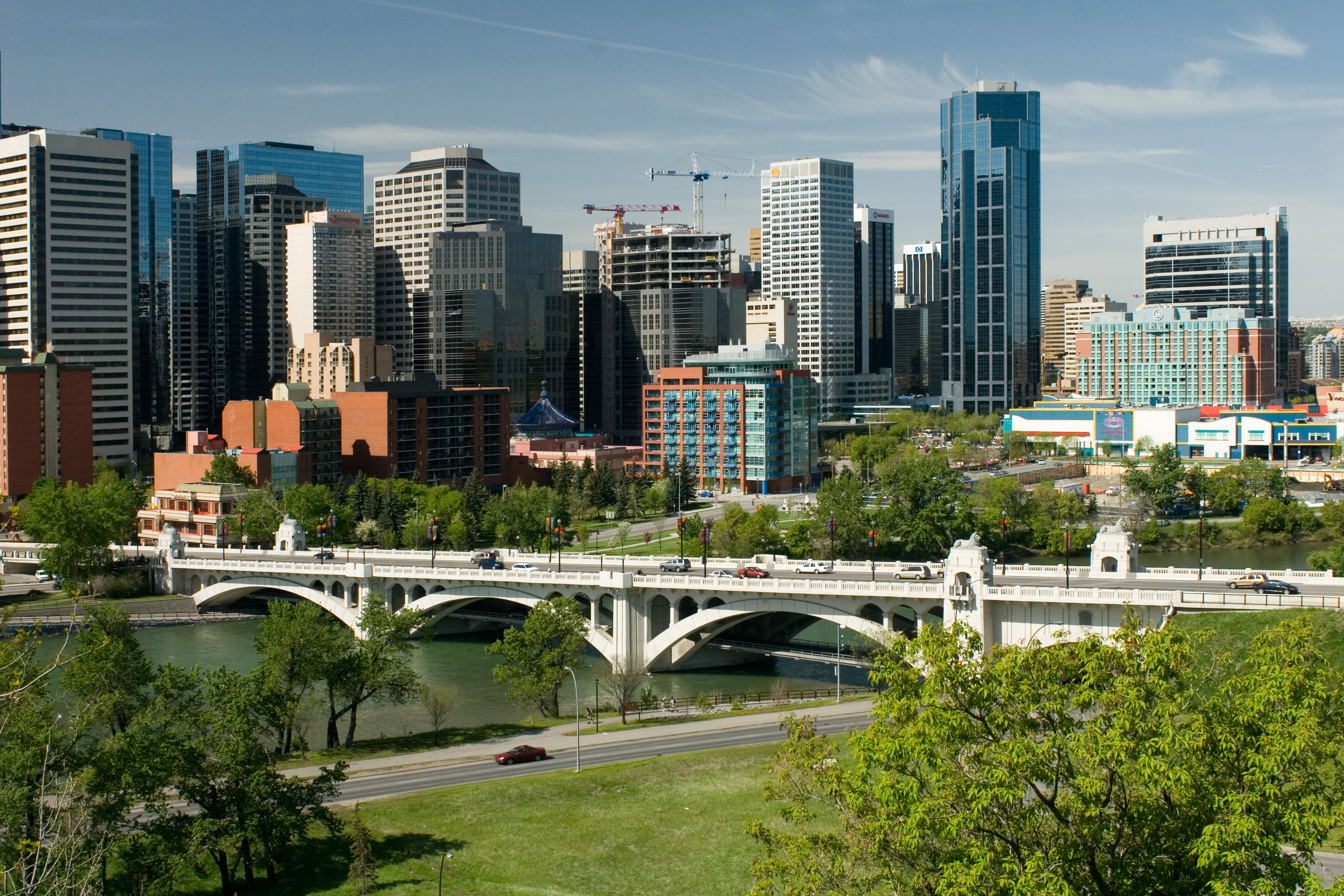
Chinatown between Bow River, Eau Claire and downtown core

In the City of Calgary's 2021 municipal census, Chinatown had a population of 2,250 living in 1,445 dwellings, a 24.3% increase from its 2011 population of 1,269. With a land area of 0.2 km^{2} (0.077 sq mi), it had a population density of 7,900/km^{2} (20,000/sq mi) in 2012.

Residents in this community had a median household income of CDN$54,400 in 2021 (vs.$98,000 for the city as a whole), and there were 27% low income residents living in the neighbourhood.

As of 2021, 54% of the residents were immigrants. A proportion of 98.4% of the buildings were apartments of more than five storeys, and 74% of the housing was used for renting.

== Crime ==
Crime Data
Year	Crime Rate (/100 pop.)
2018	2.6
2019	5.3
2020	3.2
2021	3.1
2022	2.4
2023	2.5

== See also ==
- Chinatown
- Canadian Chinese cuisine
- Chinatowns in Canada
