= Alyth/Bonnybrook =

- Neighbourhood
- Alyth/Bonnybrook Industrial
- Location of Alyth/Bonnybrook in Calgary
- Coordinates: 51°01′14″N 114°01′26″W
- Country: Canada
- Province: Alberta
- City: Calgary
- Quadrant: SE
- Ward: 9

Government
  - Mayor: Jeromy Farkas
  - Administrative body: Calgary City Council
  - Councillor: Harrison Clark (Independent)
- Elevation: 1,045 m (3,428 ft)

Population (2019)
  - Total: 0
- Website: City of Calgary PDF
- Not to be confused with the residential community of Manchester, or the industrial communities of Burnsland, Highfield or Manchester Industrial

Alyth/Bonnybrook is a predominantly industrial and subordinately residential neighbourhood in the southeast quadrant of Calgary, Alberta, Canada. Alyth is located south of Inglewood, while Bonnybrook is located in the south near Highfield Industrial.

The Alyth Yard of the Canadian Pacific Railway is located in Alyth.

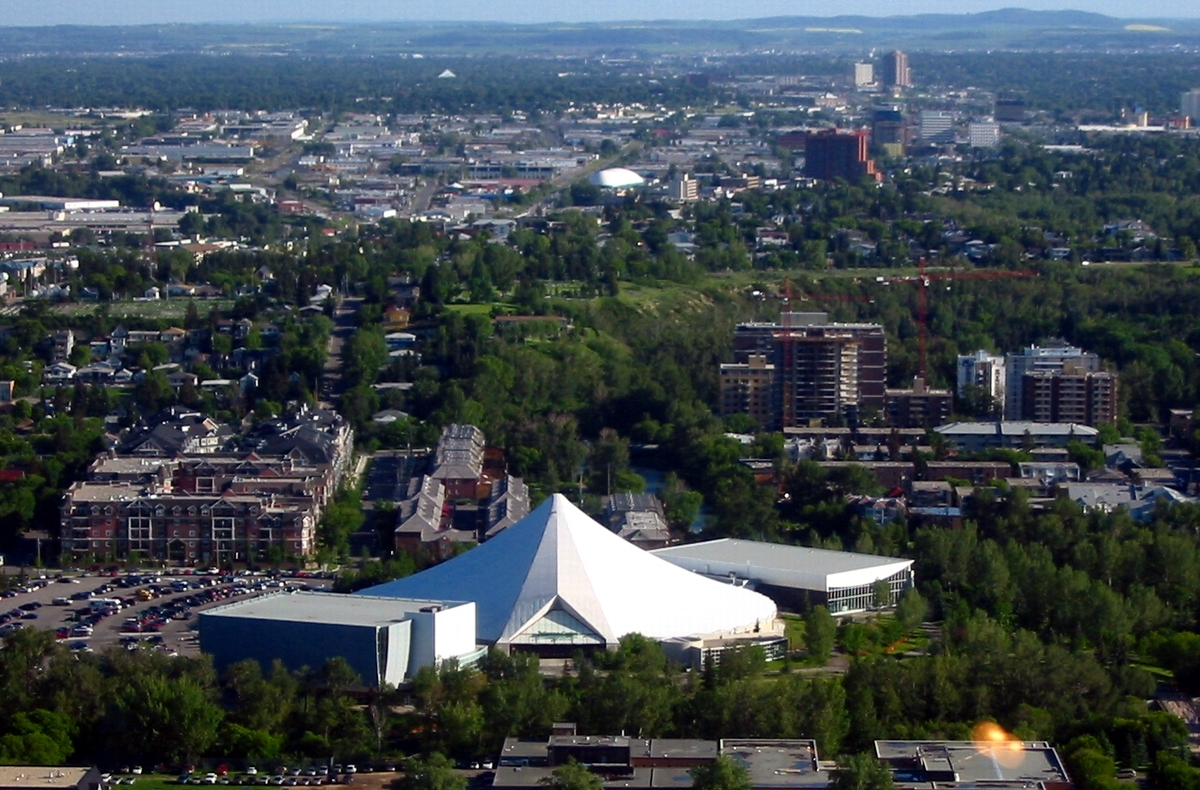
Talisman Centre with Manchester in the background

They are represented in the Calgary City Council by the Ward 9 councilor.

Historically the community was designated as being a part of one large community with Burnsland, Highfield, Manchester, and Manchester Industrial. At an unknown time they were officially separated, with Manchester being the clear outlier, being a low-income residential community instead of industrial like the others.

The postal code in this area is T2G.

== Demographics ==
In the City of Calgary 2019 municipal census, Alyth/Bonnybrook had a population of 0, with it having 11 vacant dwellings. This is compared to a population of 16 in 2012, and 17 in 2011. With a land area of 3.8 km^{2} (1.5 sq mi), it had a population density of 4.21/km^{2} (10.9/sq mi) in 2012.

== See also ==
- List of neighbourhoods in Calgary
