= Ogden, Calgary =

Ogden
- Neighbourhood
- Location of Ogden in Calgary
- Coordinates: 50°59′15″N 114°00′45″W
- Country: Canada
- Province: Alberta
- City: Calgary
- Quadrant: SE
- Ward: 9
- Established: 1912

Government
  - Administrative body: Calgary City Council

Area
  - Total: 1.6 km^{2} (0.62 sq mi)
- Elevation: 1,025 m (3,363 ft)

Population (2021)
  - Total: 8,315
  - Median Household Income: $75,500 (2,020)
- Postal code: T2C
- Website: Millican Ogden Community Association

Ogden is a residential neighbourhood in the southeast quadrant of Calgary, Alberta. It includes the districts of Lynnwood and Millican Estates. It is bounded by Glenmore Trail to the south, Deerfoot Trail and the Bow River to the west, and the CPR tracks and the industrial areas of Ogden Shops to the north and east.

The postal code in this area is T2C.

== History ==
During World War II, the Canadian Pacific Railway (CPR) Ogden Shops in Calgary were converted into a massive munitions factory producing heavy naval guns and artillery mountings.

Ogden was established in 1912. It is named after I.G. Ogden, former VP of the Canadian Pacific Railway, while the informal district of Millican takes its name from the Millican family, homesteaders of the early 1900s. It is represented in the Calgary City Council by the Ward 9 councillor.

The informal district of Lynnwood would be developed in the western half of Ogden throughout the 1970s.

The Lynnwood/Millican/Ogden Transportation Plan concept plan was developed in 2015 to support existing affordable housing, improved safety, enhanced green space, and improved accessibility to transit.

Currently Ogden Station and Lynnwood/Millican Station are both under construction on the western half of the neighborhood. Both will be a part of Calgary's Green Line light rail train line.

=== Royal Canadian Legion Branch 154 ===
The Charter to form the Royal Canadian Legion Branch 154 in Ogden was granted on June 25, 1945. In 1946 the City of Calgary granted the Branch six lots between 70th Avenue and 72nd Avenue. In 1954 one of the huts at the old Shepard R.C.A.F. depot was brought in and placed at the corner of Ogden Road and 72nd Avenue. A new building was constructed in 1982, and in October 1987 Canadian Pacific Railway donated the red Caboose that was parked at the front of the building.

In the early days, the Ogden Legion building was considered a crown jewel among the Calgary’s Royal Canadian Legion branches. The building had an eight-sheet curling rink, making it a mainstay in the city’s curling scene. The Ogden Branch also proudly sponsored the world-renowned Ogden Legion Pipe Band. The legion building was also used as a film scene for productions such as Fargo and as a venue for Stampede Wrestling. At one point, the Legion Branch 154 boasted 4,000 members, but by the time it closed the number fell to less than 400.

The veterans' organization sold the building in 2012, after which it sat empty and unused for over a decade. The empty facility became a frequent target for vandalism, squatters, and multiple fires, resulting in over 100 emergency response calls. In 2023, the City of Calgary ordered the building to be demolished, in which the owners would take the city to court over the decision.

The attempt from the owner to cancel the demolition order was dismissed by the Court of King's Bench in mid-2025, with the city hiring a contractor to demolish the building in 2026.

=== Ogden Block ===
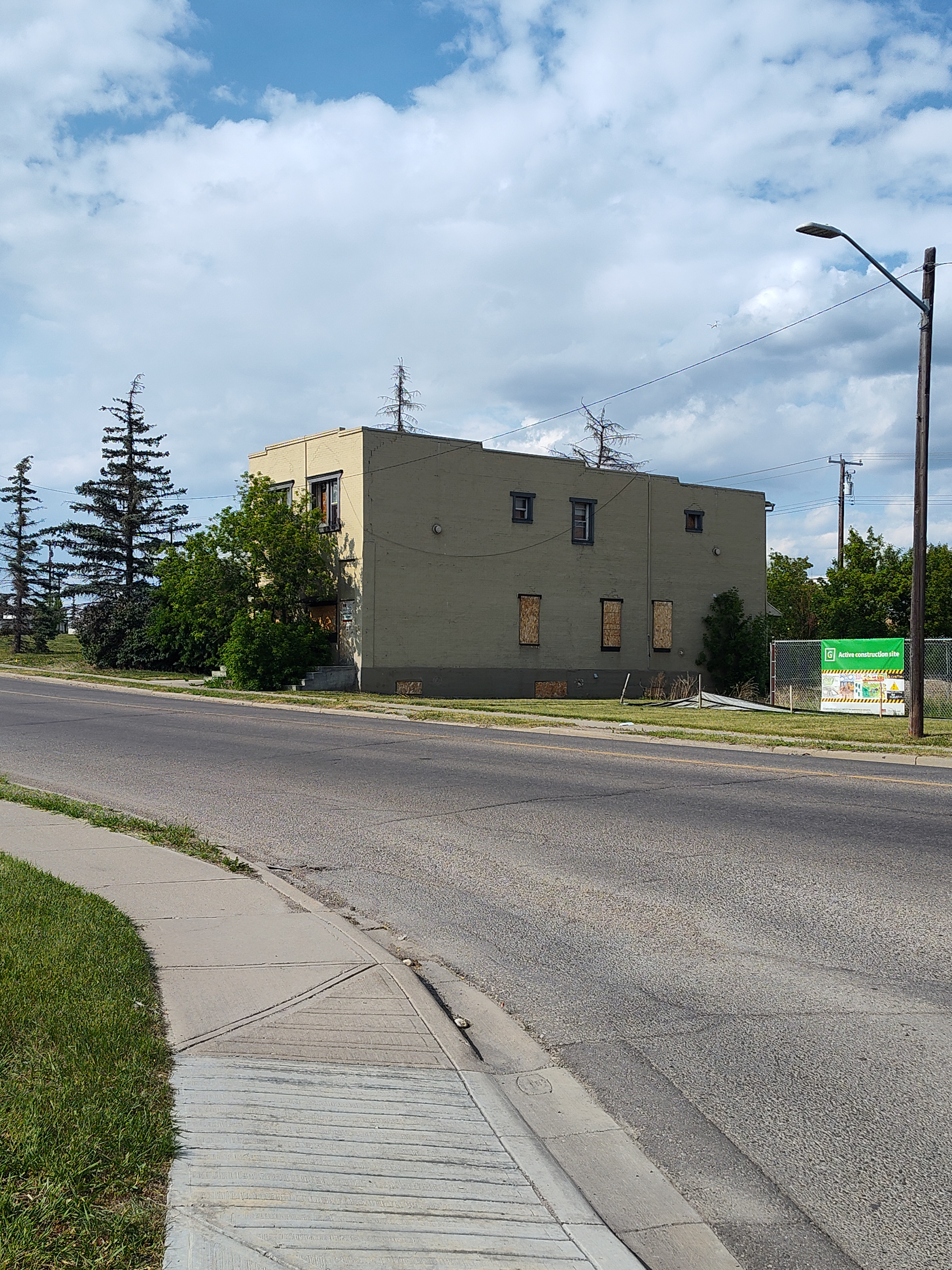
The historic 'Ogden Block' building

Ogden Block (also known as Hong Lee Laundry) is one of the oldest buildings in the city of Calgary. Built in 1913, it is a rare example of a Chinese-immigrant-owned business established outside of Calgary's historic Chinatown. Over its 113-year lifespan, it served as a bustling commercial laundry, an 18-room boarding house for immigrants, a Red Cross convalescent hospital for wounded WWI soldiers, and a multi-suite apartment building.

In 2021 the city announced plans to demolish the property for construction on the Green Line, but would receive significant backlash from the neighborhood.

The City of Calgary is currently in the process of donating the historic Ogden Block building located at 7044 Ogden Road SE to a qualified party. If it is not moved by November 15, 2026, it will be demolished.

== Crime ==
Crime Statistics
Category	2025	5Y Avg	% Change 5Y Avg
Violence 'Other' (Non-domestic)	27	18	50%
Theft OF Vehicle	19	44	-56%
Theft FROM Vehicle	42	60	-30%
Street Robbery	3	4	-29%
Commercial Robbery	2	4	-44%
Break & Enter - Other Premises	3	8	-61%
Break & Enter - Dwelling	7	6	17%
Break & Enter - Commercial	11	17	-37%
Assault (Non-domestic)	30	27	9%
Total	144	188	-23%

== Demographics ==
In the City of Calgary's 2021 community profile, Ogden had a population of 8,315 living in 3,740 private households. Single and semi-detached dwellings account for 59% of housing. Dwelling condition: regular maintenance or minor repairs needed is 93%, while only 7% require major repairs. The housing market splits into 60% owner-occupied and 40% renter-occupied. The average city-assessed value for a single-family residential house is approximately $495,245. City-wide, the overall median single-residential assessment is $706,000, making housing affordability based on median household income in line with the City Calgary area.

The community has a land area of 4.1 km^{2} (1.6 sq mi), and in 2012 had a population density of 2,122/km^{2} (5,500/sq mi). Population growth has since remained steady but is projected to grow with the community redevelopment.

Residents in this community had a median household income of $75,500 in 2020. The percentage of residents with low income was 13%, and 16% of the population were immigrants.

In terms of education, the highest certificate, diploma or degree completed:

- No certificate, diploma or degree 19%
- High school diploma or equivalent 36%
- Post-secondary certificate, diploma or degree 45%

== Economics ==
In December 2012, CP Rail decided to relocate its corporate head offices to Ogden. This move involved building new corporate offices within the existing century-old Ogden rail yard.

== Education ==
The community is served by Banting & Best Elementary and Sherwood Community public schools, as well as St. Bernadette Elementary School (Catholic).

== See also ==
- List of neighbourhoods in Calgary
- Manchester, Calgary
- Riverbend, Calgary
- Shepard, Calgary
