= Glenmore Trail =

Highway in Calgary, Alberta

Route information
- Maintained by the Ministry of Transportation and Economic Corridors
- Length: 18.4 km (11.4 mi)
- Existed: 1963–present

Major junctions
- West end: Stoney Trail SW (Highway 201) / Sarcee Trail
- Crowchild Trail; 14 Street SW; Macleod Trail; Deerfoot Trail (Highway 2); Stoney Trail SE (Highway 201)
- East end: Highway 560

Location
- Country: Canada
- Province: Alberta
- Major cities: Calgary

Highway system
- Alberta Numbered Highway Network; List; Former
- Roads in Calgary

Glenmore Trail is a 22-kilometre (14 mi) expressway in Calgary, Alberta, Canada, named after the reservoir which it crosses. It is a freeway between Sarcee Trail in southwest Calgary to Barlow Trail in the southeast, carrying nearly 160,000 vehicles per weekday at its busiest point placing it second only to Deerfoot Trail as the busiest road in Alberta. East of Calgary, Glenmore Trail becomes Highway 560 en route to Langdon.

== Route description ==
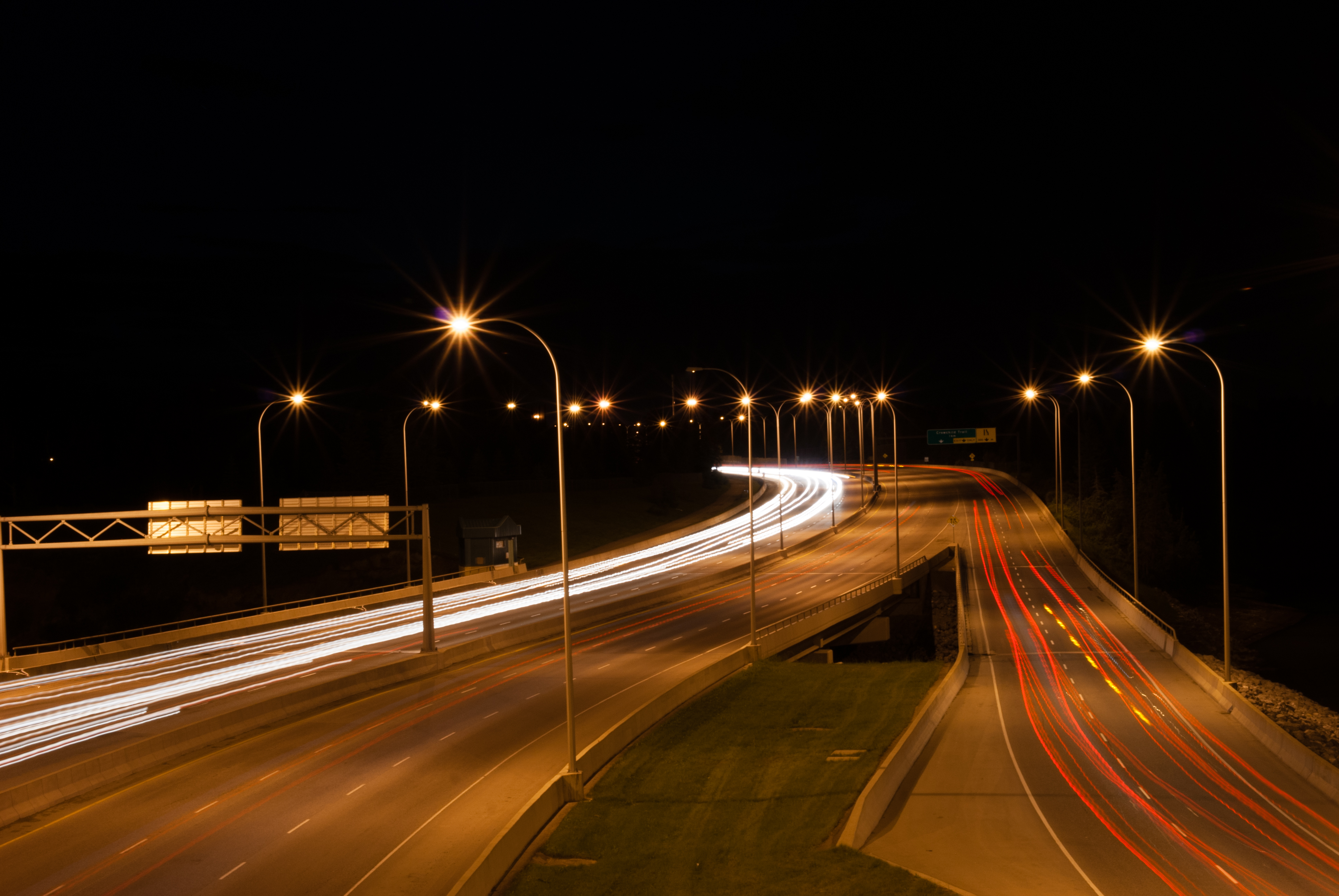
Westbound Glenmore Trail crossing the Glenmore Causeway in Calgary

Glenmore Trail begins at a cloverstack interchange with Sarcee Trail and Stoney Trail (Highway 201) which opened in October 2020 as part of Calgary's Southwest Ring Road project. Located near the Tsuu T'ina First Nation, Stoney Trail becomes Tsuut'ina Trail when it leaves Calgary and enters the Nation south of the interchange. Glenmore Trail proceeds east as an eight-lane freeway with a speed limit of 80 km/h (50 mph), to a diamond interchange at 37 Street SW / Grey Eagle Boulevard. This provides access to the Grey Eagle Resort and Casino, located in and operated by the Tsuu T'ina First Nation on the site of a former military barrack. East of 37 Street, Glenmore Trail reduces to six lanes but traffic levels continue to increase as it continues east to an interchange with Crowchild Trail. Traffic levels double to nearly 160,000 vehicles per day, and Glenmore Trail carries four lanes of traffic each way toward the Glenmore Reservoir.

Beginning in 2005, the causeway carrying Glenmore Trail over the reservoir was extensively upgraded as part of a $57 million project that was completed in 2008. Prior to the improvements, seven lanes (three eastbound and four westbound) crossed the reservoir. The improvements saw construction of a new bridge carrying two lanes from northbound 14 Street SW to westbound Glenmore Trail, and reconstruction of the existing bridge carrying westbound Glenmore Trail. Construction was staggered and planned to minimize disruption to existing traffic. Nine total lanes crossed the reservoir at the completion of the project.

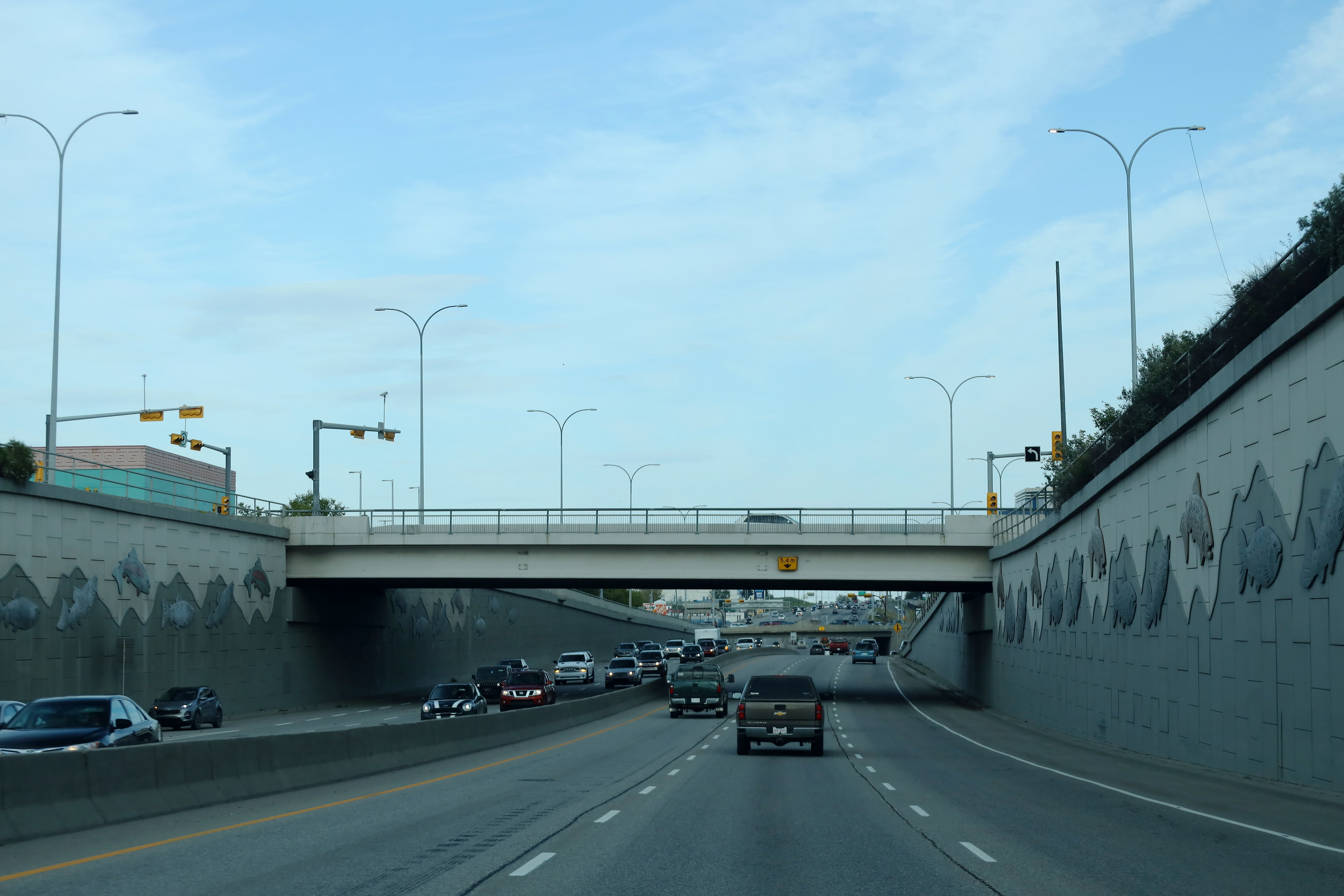
Eastbound Glenmore Trail passing Chinook Centre

East of the reservoir, the freeway passes under the major north-south arterial of 14 Street SW. It then descends into a trough constructed beneath Elbow Drive and 5 Street SW; a single interchange complex links the two north-south routes with braided ramps to Glenmore Trail and the existing single-point urban interchange at Macleod Trail just south of Chinook Centre. East of Macleod Trail, Glenmore continues as a six lane freeway across the south leg of CTrain Red Line into primarily commercial developments of southeast Calgary, where it meets Blackfoot Trail in a partial cloverleaf interchange, and continues to Deerfoot Trail (Highway 2). The interchange at Deerfoot Trail is often congested, particularly for traffic travelling north-south on Deerfoot as the road squeezes to two lanes from three in each direction.

East of Deerfoot Trail, the freeway curves to the southeast and traffic levels decrease by approximately one half, to less than 70,000 vehicles per weekday in 2015. Glenmore Trail passes to the north of Calgary Auto Mall before crossing the Bow River on the Graves Bridge, which was twinned in 2009 and now carries three lanes westbound and four lanes eastbound on two separate structures. East of the river, Glenmore Trail passes between the residential areas of Ogden and Riverbend before a partial cloverleaf interchange at 18 Street SE. The four-lane freeway continues east over the CPKC Brooks subdivision mainline and a diamond interchange with Ogden Road / 24 Street SE. The freeway ends at an at-grade split intersection with Barlow Trail, and the four lane expressway continues east through commercial and light industrial development across at-grade intersections with 52 Street SE and 68 Street SE before a partial cloverleaf interchange at Stoney Trail.

Beyond Stoney Trail, Glenmore Trail becomes a two-lane highway and becomes Highway 560, maintained by Alberta Transportation. The roadway and property to the north are in Rocky View County; however, land to the south of the roadway is still within Calgary limits. Glenmore Trail passes 100 Street SE and fully enters Rocky View County east of 116 Street SE (Range Road 284), continuing east at 100 km/h (62 mph) as a rural two-lane highway. Highway 560 ends in Langdon, but Glenmore Trail continues east at 80 km/h (50 mph) as a two-lane rural road (Township Road 234), ending at Highway 817 south of Strathmore.

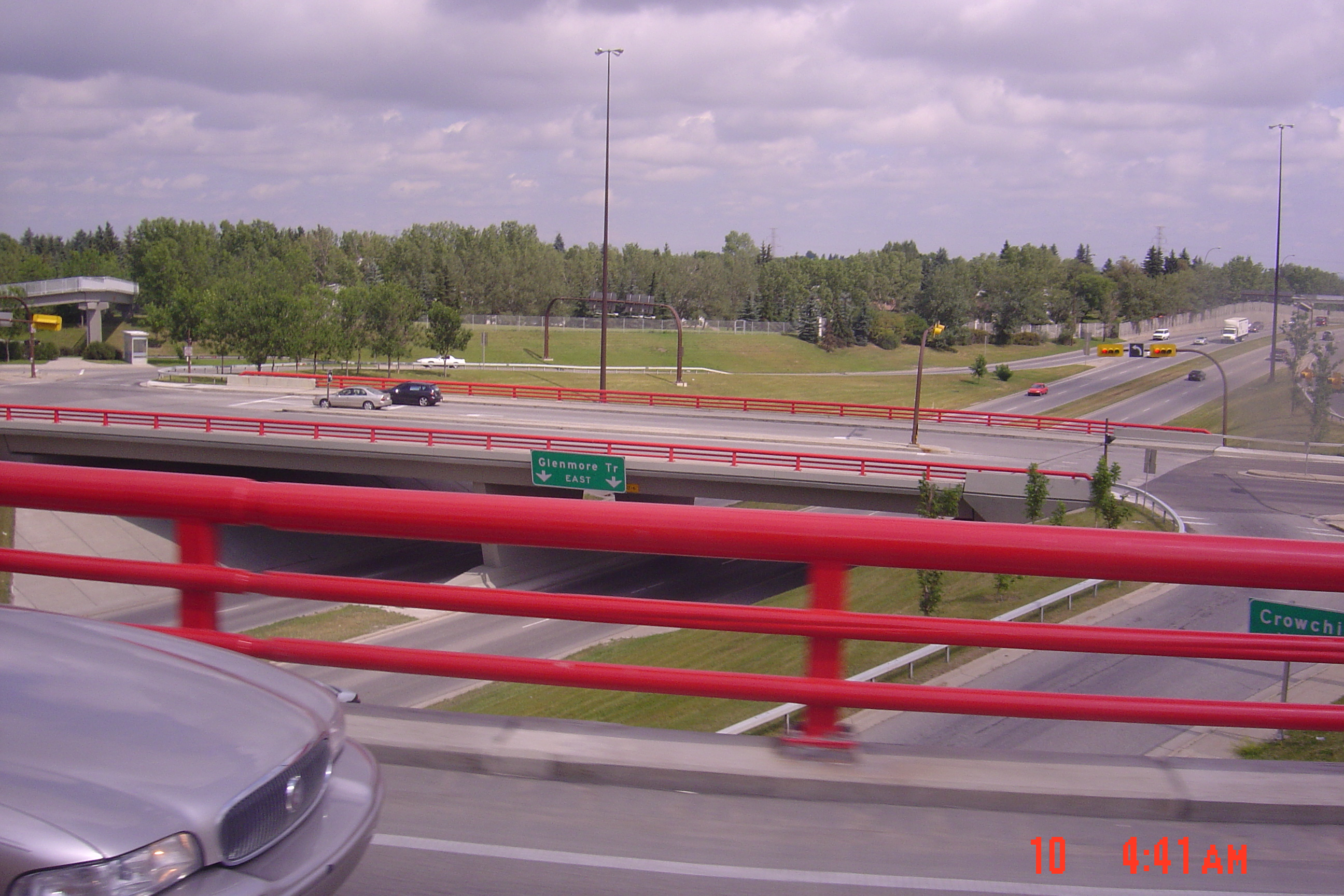
The intersection of Glenmore Trail at Crowchild Trail in Calgary

== History ==
In 1933, construction of a dam across the Elbow River was completed in south Calgary. The reservoir it created was named Glenmore (Gaelic for "big valley"), a name given to the area by 19th century explorer Sam Livingston. The first segment of Glenmore Trail was built in the 1960s and stretched from Sarcee Trail to Blackfoot Trail, with the western part of the roadway actually turned and continued north as Sarcee Trail, connecting to the Trans-Canada Highway (Highway 1). During that time, the section of Glenmore Trail between Macleod Trail and Blackfoot Trail was part of Highway 2 as it bypassed downtown Calgary. Glenmore Trail was then extended across the Bow River on the Graves Bridge to the eastern city limit by the 1970s. Interchanges at Macleod Trail and Blackfoot Trail had also been constructed, and others at Crowchild Trail and 14 Street SW by the mid 1980s, as well the Highway 2 designation was moved to Deerfoot Trail.

In the 1980, Highway 8 was commissioned and followed Richmond Road west towards Bragg Creek and Glenmore Trail was designated as part of Highway 8 west of Deerfoot Trail; however the highway was unsigned. In 1992, Glenmore Trail was extended west when Highway 8 was realigned to bypass Signal Hill; however, the new roadway ended a T-intersection at the transition between the existing Sarcee and Glenmore Trails; this resulted in "Glenmore Trail" commonly referring to the roadway east of Sarcee Trail and "Highway 8" referring to the roadway west of Sarcee Trail, despite both officially sharing the same designations.

In 2005, construction of the $170 million complex interchange between Macleod Trail and 14 Street SW was a massive undertaking, at the time the largest road project in the history of Calgary. Replacing signalized intersections at Elbow Drive and 5 Street SW, it included lowering Glenmore Trail nine metres (30 ft) beneath the existing terrain by excavating 500,000 m^{3} (18,000,000 cu ft) of earth, and the extensive use of mechanically stabilized earth walls to maintain the trough. The retaining walls are adorned with 144 coloured concrete trout which serve as aesthetic design elements.

In 2010, an interchange with two roundabouts opened at Glenmore's intersection with 37 Street SW. The bridge was built to potentially be reused, depending on Alberta's final plans for construction of the southwest portion of the Stoney Trail ring road.

In 2015, work began on a $125 million project to construct a diamond interchange at Glenmore Trail and Ogden Road SE as well as a bridge over the CP Rail mainline, replaced the level railway crossing and signalized intersection, and opened in July 2017. As part of the project, provisions were made for the future Green Line as well as staging for a future interchange at Barlow Trail.

In 2018, as part of the Southwest Ring Road project, the province of Alberta significantly upgraded Glenmore Trail from 101 Street SW to 37 Street SW, which included the section of Glenmore Trail / Highway 8 between Sarcee Trail and 101 Street SW being re-designated as Stoney Trail (Highway 201). A large cloverstack interchange was constructed at Sarcee Trail, extending Stoney Trail south to Highway 22X as Tsuut'ina Trail. The temporary interchange at 37 Street SW was dismantled, and replaced by diamond interchange. At the same time, the City of Calgary widened Glenmore Trail from four to six lanes between 37 Street SW and Crowchild Trail. Construction concluded in fall 2020.

== Future ==
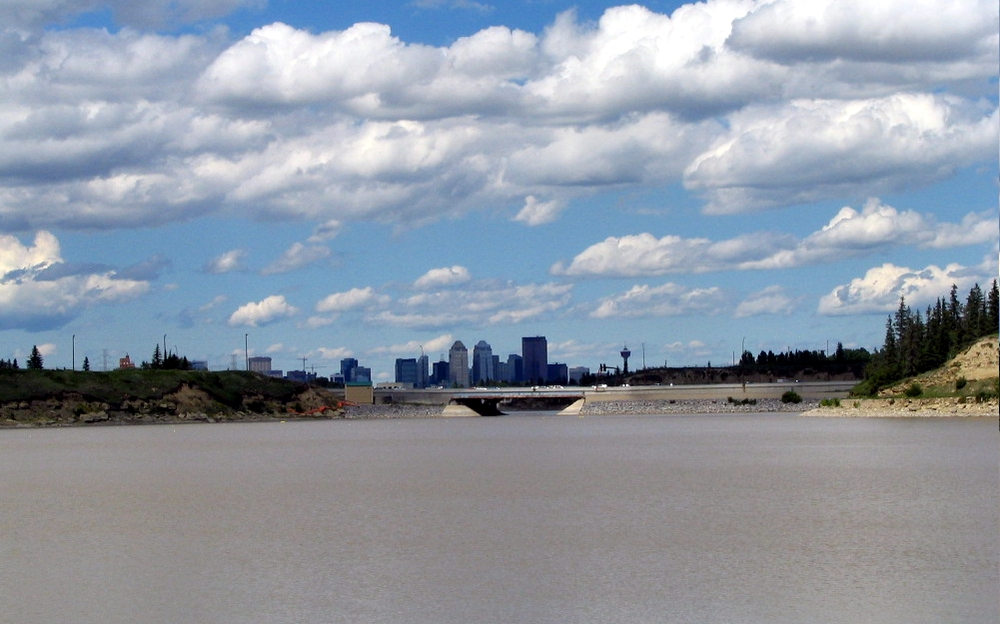
Bridge over Glenmore Reservoir along Glenmore Trail

With the completion of the Stoney Trail/Sarcee Trail interchange, Glenmore Trail is a full freeway from its western terminus to Barlow Trail. The City of Calgary has long term plans to make it a full freeway but the required interchanges remain unfunded. In the interim, the intersection at 68 Street SE is being constructed to include a jughandle as part of its northern extension. The City of Calgary, Alberta Transportation and Rocky View County are also working on a joint study regarding future interchange plans on at 100 Street SE, 116 Street SE and Rainbow Road; however they are not anticipated to be constructed for 20-30 years.

In 2008, Alberta completed a functional planning study to determine the best course of action for upgrades to the incomplete interchange of Glenmore Trail and Deerfoot Trail. The interchange carries 130,000 vehicles per day on Deerfoot Trail and 100,000 vehicles on Glenmore making it one of the busiest interchanges in Alberta, but there is no direct access for traffic turning from northbound Deerfoot to westbound Glenmore. Traffic must first exit to the east, proceed through a traffic light behind Calgary Auto Mall, and enter Glenmore Trail from the north side. Stage 1 of the proposed improvements would not remedy this problem, but rather correct a pinch point on Deerfoot Trail by constructing a new three lane bridge to carry the northbound lanes over Glenmore. Ultimately, a large cloverstack interchange is planned with north-west and east-north flyovers to provide free-flowing access to and from Deerfoot Trail, but it will require acquisition of land from adjacent properties. The plans also call for widening of Glenmore Trail to as many as 10 lanes between Blackfoot and Deerfoot, modifications of the interchange at Blackfoot Trail, and braided ramps.

== Major intersections ==
The entire route is in Calgary. All exits are unnumbered.

| km | mi | Destinations | Notes |
|---|---|---|---|
| −5.0 | −3.1 | Highway 8 west – Bragg Creek Stoney Trail (Highway 201 north) | Formerly continued west; Highway 201 exit 28 |
| −2.4 | −1.5 | 69 Street SW / Discovery Ridge Boulevard | Formerly part of Highway 8 / Glenmore Trail; Highway 201 exit 26 |
| 0.0 | 0.0 | Stoney Trail (Highway 201) / Sarcee Trail | Highway 201 exit 22; Stoney Trail becomes Tsuut′ina Trail south of interchange (unsigned) |
| 1.5 | 0.93 | 37 Street SW / Grey Eagle Boulevard | Access to Tsuu T'ina First Nation and Mount Royal University |
| 2.5 | 1.6 | Richard Road | Westbound right-in/right-out; alternate access to Mount Royal University |
| 3.6 | 2.2 | Crowchild Trail | |
| 4.9 | 3.0 | Glenmore Causeway crosses Glenmore Reservoir (Elbow River) | |
| 5.2 | 3.2 | 14 Street SW | Access to Rockyview General Hospital and Heritage Park |
| 6.1 | 3.8 | Elbow Drive | |
| 6.6 | 4.1 | 5 Street SW – Shopping Centre | No westbound exit; access to Chinook Centre |
| 7.0 | 4.3 | Macleod Trail – Shopping Centre, City Centre | |
| 7.5 | 4.7 | Centre Street S / Fairmont Drive – Shopping Centre | Eastbound exit and westbound entrance; alternate access to Chinook Centre |
| 8.3 | 5.2 | Blackfoot Trail | |
| 9.5 | 5.9 | Deerfoot Trail (Highway 2) – Airport (YYC) | Highway 2 exit 248; former Highway 8 eastern terminus (unsigned) |
| 10.2 | 6.3 | Heritage Drive / Glendeer Circle | |
| 10.6 | 6.6 | Graves Bridge crosses the Bow River | |
| 11.5 | 7.1 | 18 Street SE | |
| 12.8 | 8.0 | Ogden Road / 24 Street SE | |
| 13.8 | 8.6 | 30 Street SE, 31 Street SE | Westbound exit and eastbound entrance |
| 14.1 | 8.8 | Barlow Trail | At-grade; Diverging diamond interchange proposed |
| 15.8 | 9.8 | 52 Street SE | At-grade; Partial cloverleaf interchange proposed |
| 17.4 | 10.8 | 68 Street SE | At-grade; Partial cloverleaf interchange proposed |
| 18.4 | 11.4 | Stoney Trail (Highway 201) Highway 560 east – Langdon | Combination interchange proposed; Highway 201 exit 88; continues east |
1.000 mi = 1.609 km; 1.000 km = 0.621 mi: Closed/former; Incomplete access

== See also ==
- Transportation in Calgary
