= Country Hills Boulevard =

Expressway in Calgary, Alberta, Canada

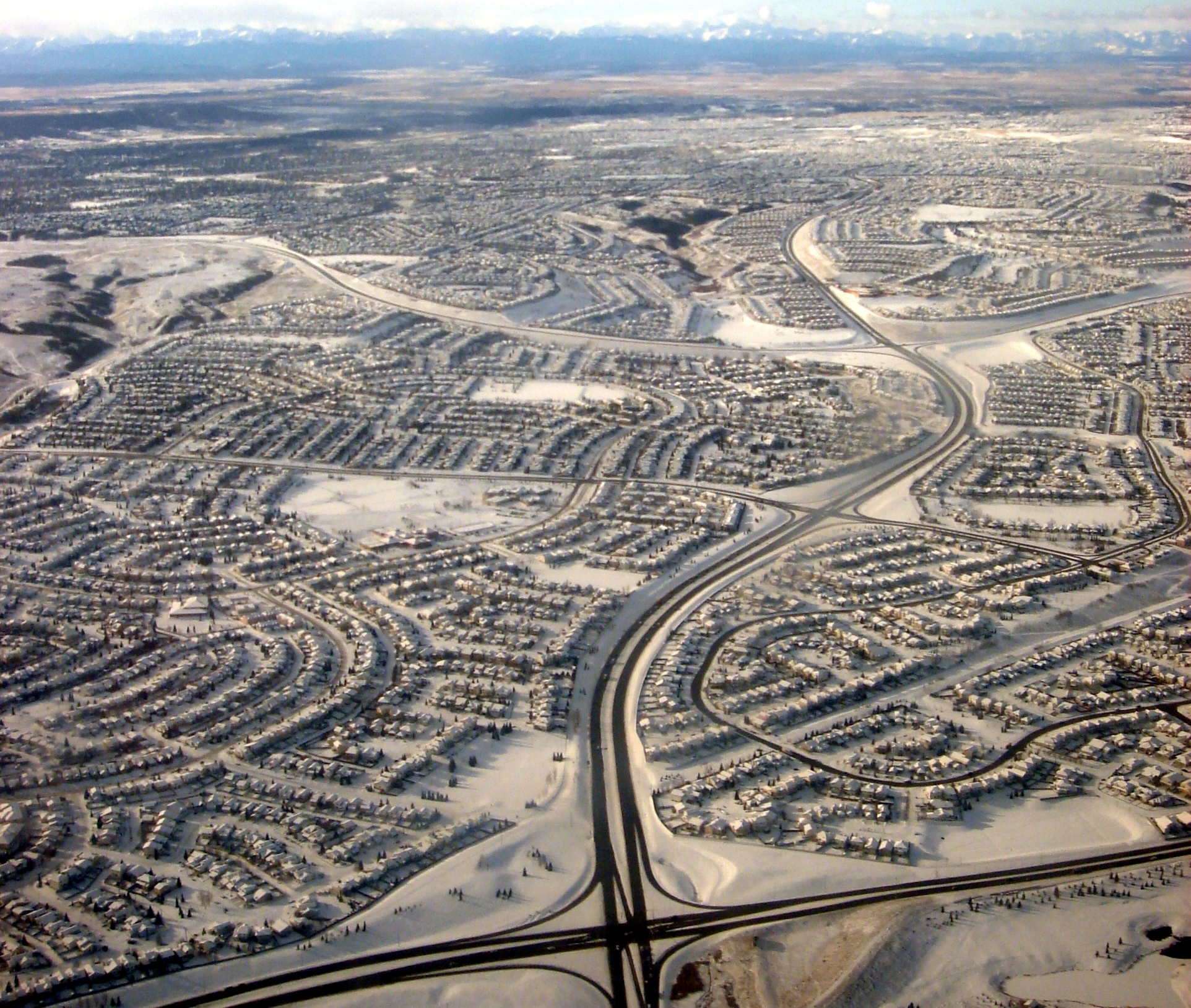
- Country Hills Boulevard and Beddington Trail intersecting in the lower part of the photo
- Former name: 112 Avenue N
- Length: 25.4 km (15.8 mi)
- Location: Calgary, Alberta
- West end: 12 Mile Coulee Road (Calgary city limit)
- Major junctions: Stoney Trail NW (Highway 201); Sarcee Trail; Shaganappi Trail; 14 Street NW; Beddington Trail; Deerfoot Trail (Highway 2); Barlow Trail; Metis Trail; Stoney Trail NE (Highway 201)
- East end: Highway 564 (Calgary city limit)

Country Hills Boulevard is a major expressway in Calgary, Alberta. It is notably one of the longest east-west routes in Calgary and one of the few routes north of 16 Avenue N and south of the northern leg of Stoney Trail that is mostly continuous from the west end of the city to the east end. East of Calgary, Country Hills Boulevard continues as Alberta Highway 564. West of Calgary, it continues as Hamilton Drive as it passes through the Bearspaw Country Club. Country Hills Boulevard was originally named 112 Avenue N, and was a rural road in northeastern Calgary, but was renamed in the early 1990s when its namesake community of Country Hills, as well as Harvest Hills and Coventry Hills, were constructed. Throughout the 1990s, the roadway was constructed in segments in northwest Calgary, departing from the original road allowance to follow the area's hilly topography.

A small segment of Country Hills Boulevard between Deerfoot Trail (Highway 2) and Barlow Trail was once designated as part of Highway 2A, but was decommissioned in the 1980s.

== Major intersections ==
From west to east. The entire route is in Calgary.

km	mi	Destinations	Notes
0.0	0.0	Continues as Hamilton Drive (Township Road 254)	
0.0	0.0	Twelve Mile Coulee Road	Calgary city limits
1.6	0.99	Rocky Ridge Road	
3.3	2.1	Royal Birch Boulevard, 112 Avenue NW	
3.8– 4.6	2.4– 2.9	Stoney Trail (Highway 201)	Partial cloverleaf interchange (traffic signals), exit 43 on Hwy 201
4.8	3.0	Citadel Way	
5.8	3.6	Citadel Gate, Nose Hill Drive	
6.7	4.2	Citadel Link, Hawkstone Gate	
7.2	4.5	Sarcee Trail	
7.8	4.8	Hamptons Boulevard, Edgepark Boulevard	
8.3	5.2	Hamptons Boulevard	
9.5	5.9	Hamptons Drive, Edgebrook Boulevard	
10.2	6.3	Shaganappi Trail	
11.3	7.0	14 Street NW	
12.2– 12.7	7.6– 7.9	Beddington Trail	Partial cloverleaf interchange
13.6	8.5	Country Hills Drive	
13.8	8.6	Panorama Hills Boulevard	
14.3	8.9	Panorama Hills Way, Country Hills Drive	
14.6	9.1	Harvest Hills Boulevard	Boundary between NW and NE quadrants
15.0	9.3	Country Village Way	
15.6	9.7	Coventry Hills Boulevard	
15.9	9.9	Harvest Hills Gate	
16.3	10.1	Coventry Boulevard	
17.3	10.7	14 Street NE	
18.2– 18.6	11.3– 11.6	Deerfoot Trail (Highway 2)	Partial cloverleaf interchange (traffic signals), exit 268 on Hwy 2
18.8	11.7	Freeport Drive	
19.1	11.9	Barlow Trail – Calgary International Airport	
20.5	12.7	36 Street NE	
21.3	13.2	Métis Trail	
22.1	13.7	52 Street NE, Cityscape Gate	
23.8	14.8	68 Street NE	
24.5– 25.0	15.2– 15.5	Stoney Trail (Highway 201)	Partial cloverleaf interchange, exit 68 on Hwy 201
25.4	15.8	Continues as Highway 564 east – Delacour	
1.000 mi = 1.609 km; 1.000 km = 0.621 mi

== See also ==
- Transportation in Calgary
