= Alberta Highway 560 =

Highway in Alberta, Canada

Highway 560
- Glenmore Trail, Township Road 234
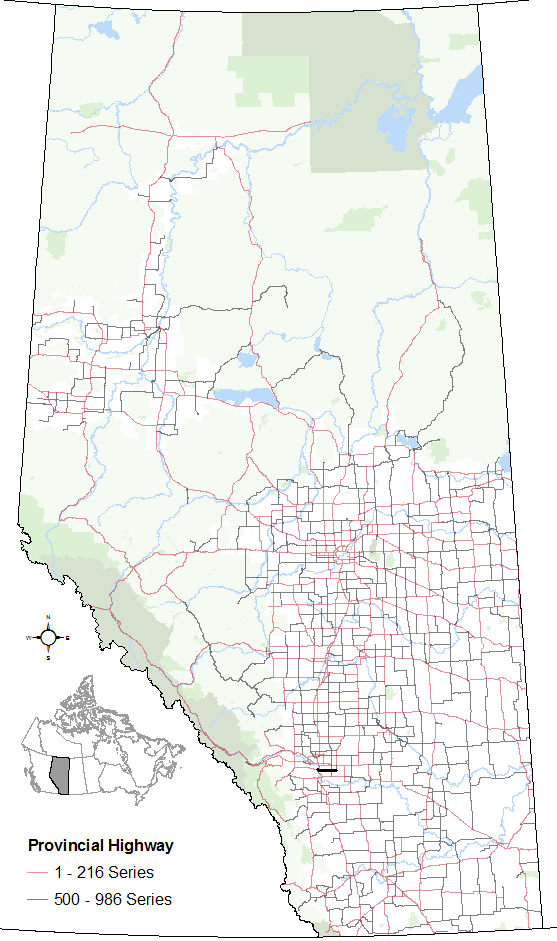

Route information
- Maintained by Alberta Transportation
- Length: 17.0 km (10.6 mi)

Major junctions
- West end: Highway 201 in Calgary
- Highway 791 near Indus
- East end: Highway 797 in Langdon

Location
- Country: Canada
- Province: Alberta
- Specialized and rural municipalities: Rocky View County
- Major cities: Calgary

Highway system
- Alberta Numbered Highway Network; List; Former
← Highway 556	→ Highway 561

Alberta Provincial Highway No. 560, commonly referred to as Highway 560 or Glenmore Trail, is a highway in the province of Alberta, Canada. It runs west–east from the east Calgary boundary at 84 Street SE (Range Road 290), north along the city boundary to Range Road 284, across Highway 791 south of Chestermere to the southern terminus of the northern section of Highway 797, Centre Street in Langdon.

It is named Glenmore Trail within Calgary city limits. Highway 560 extends to the west in an interchange with the freeways of Hwy 2 and Highway 8. It extends to the east as Township Road 234 to Highway 24, and Highway 817.

== Major intersections ==
Starting from the west end of Highway 560:

Rural/specialized municipality	Location	km	mi	Destinations	Notes
City of Calgary		0.0	0.0	Glenmore Trail west Stoney Trail (Highway 201)	Interchange; Highway 201 exit 88; continues as Glenmore Trail
Rocky View County		2.4	1.5	100 Street SE (Range Road 285)	
Rocky View County		10.5	6.5	Highway 791 – Chestermere, Indus	
Rocky View County	Langdon	17.0	10.6	Highway 797 north / Centre Street (Range Road 272)	Highway 560 eastern terminus
Wheatland County		26.8	16.7	Highway 24 – Cheadle, Vulcan, Lethbridge	
Wheatland County		36.6	22.7	Highway 817 – Strathmore, Carseland	
1.000 mi = 1.609 km; 1.000 km = 0.621 mi: Closed/former

== See also ==
- Transportation in Calgary
