= Riverbend, Calgary =

Riverbend
- Neighbourhood
- Location of Riverbend in Calgary
- Coordinates: 50°58′22″N 114°00′56″W
- Country: Canada
- Province: Alberta
- City: Calgary
- Quadrant: SE
- Ward: 11
- Established: 1982

Government
  - Mayor: Jeromy Farkas
  - Administrative body: Calgary City Council
  - Councillor: Rob Ward (Communities First)

Area
  - Total: 3.0 km^{2} (1.2 sq mi)
- Elevation: 1,020 m (3,350 ft)

Population (2006)
  - Total: 10,319
  - Average Income: $78,574
- Website: Riverbend Community Association

Riverbend is a residential neighbourhood in the southeast quadrant of Calgary, Alberta. It is bounded to the north by Glenmore Trail, to the east by 24 Street E and to the west by Deerfoot Trail. It is developed in the Bow River floodplain, on its escarpment and the upland plain.

Riverbend was established as a neighbourhood in 1982. It is represented in the Calgary City Council by the Ward 9 councillor.

== Demographics ==
In the City of Calgary's 2013 municipal census, Riverbend had a population of 9,682 living in 3,450 dwellings, nearly identical to its 2012 population of 9,684. With a land area of 4.1 km^{2} (1.6 sq mi), it had a population density of 2,361/km^{2} (6,120/sq mi) in 2013.

Residents in this community had a median household income of $78,574 in 2000, and there were 6.1% low income residents living in the neighbourhood. As of 2000, 17.3% of the residents were immigrants. A proportion of 2.5% of the buildings were condominiums or apartments, and 3.5% of the housing was used for renting.

Pop. Overtime
Year	Population
2014	9696
2015	9612
2016	9430
2017	9338
2018	9248
2019	9244
2021	9205

== Education ==
This neighbourhood has one public elementary school: Riverbend Elementary School (K-6), and one Catholic school: Holy Angels Elementary School. (K-6)

== See also ==
- List of neighbourhoods in Calgary
