= Blackfoot Trail =

Expressway in Calgary, Alberta

- Length: 10.3 km (6.4 mi)
- Location: Calgary, Alberta
- South end: Southland Drive
- Major junctions: Heritage Drive; Glenmore Trail
- North end: Deerfoot Trail (Highway 2) / 17 Avenue SE

Blackfoot Trail is a super-4 expressway in Calgary, Alberta. It is named for the Blackfoot Confederacy, and more specifically the Siksika Nation, located east of Calgary. The road runs from 17 Avenue SE in the north, where Blackfoot Trail meets Deerfoot Trail (Highway 2), to Southland Drive in the south. It is the historical alignment of Highway 2 in south Calgary. The section of Blackfoot Trail between 19 Street SE and Deerfoot Trail is a former alignment, and still technically part of, 17 Avenue SE; however, it is generally referred to as being part of Blackfoot Trail.

== History ==
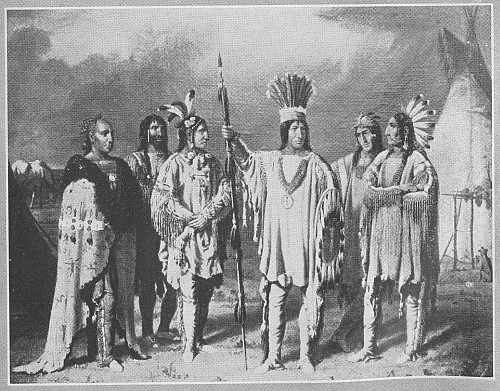
"Blackfoot Chiefs" by Paul Kane (1873-1946)

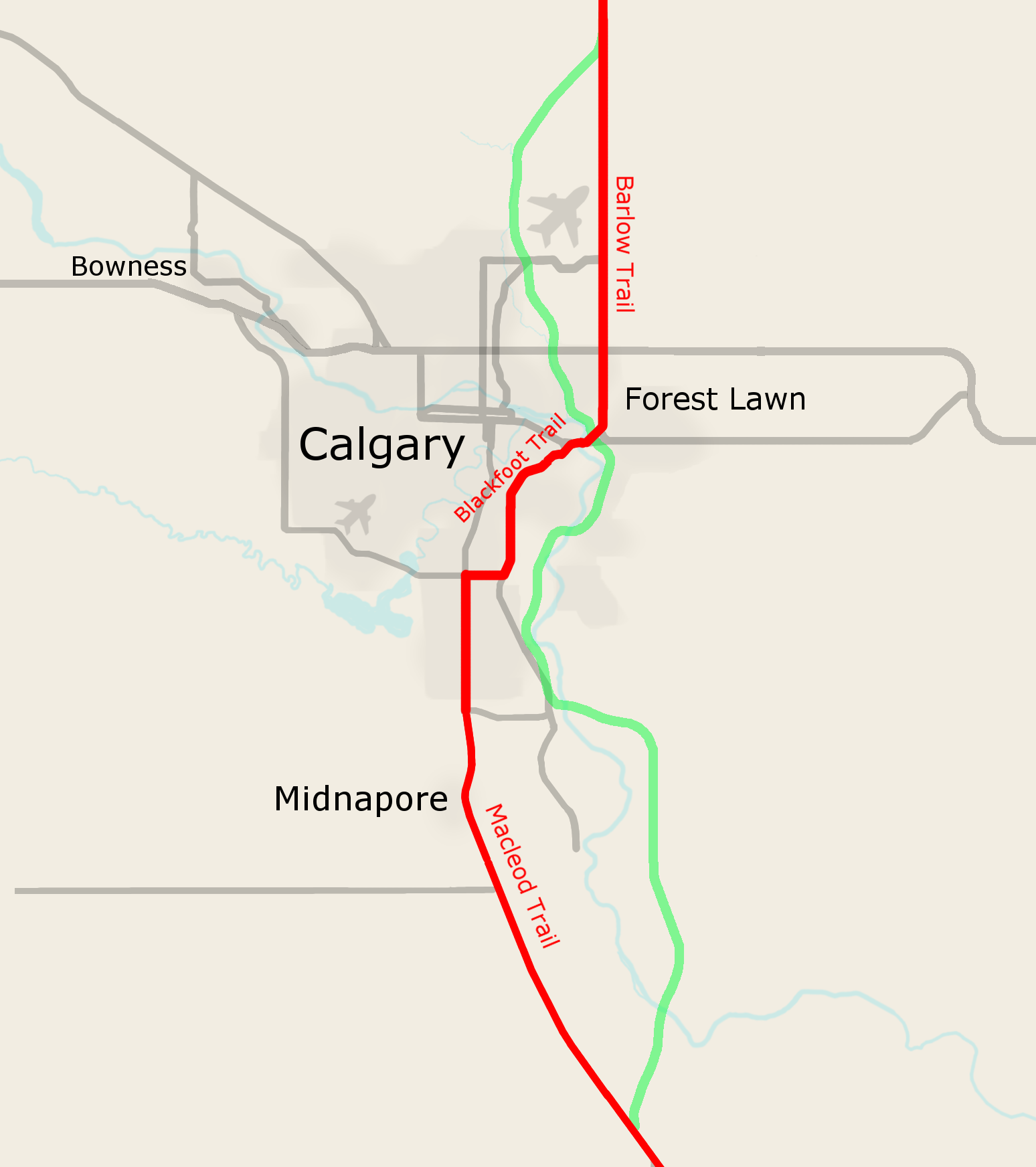
Highway 2 in Calgary in the late 1960s (red line) when it followed the alignment of present-day Macleod, Glenmore, and Blackfoot Trails, 17 Avenue SE, and Barlow Trail. The green line represents the present-day alignment of Deerfoot Trail.

Prior to the construction of Deerfoot Trail, which was originally named the Blackfoot Trail Freeway, Blackfoot Trail was the routing of Highway 2 through the southern portion of Calgary. It continued south to 66 Avenue SE (present-day Glenmore Trail) and Macleod Trail. At the north end, Highway 2 continued east on 17 Avenue SE, before turning north to Barlow Trail. Blackfoot trail started construction in 1957 and ended in the early 1960s.

== Major intersections ==
From south to north. The entire route is in Calgary.

| km | mi | Destinations | Notes |
|---|---|---|---|
| 0.0 | 0.0 | Southland Drive | Southern terminus; adjacent to Deerfoot Trail interchange (Hwy 2 Exit 245) |
| 1.9 | 1.2 | Heritage Drive | |
| 3.4 | 2.1 | Glenmore Trail | Partial cloverleaf interchange |
| 4.3 | 2.7 | 58 Avenue SE | |
| 5.9 | 3.7 | 42 Avenue SE | |
| 8.0 | 5.0 | 26 Avenue SE / Ogden Road | Partial cloverleaf interchange |
| 8.7 | 5.4 | Alyth Road | |
| 8.9 | 5.5 | 15 Street SE – City Centre | Access to 9 Avenue SE |
| 9.4 | 5.8 | 17A Street SE / 19 Street SE – City Centre | Access to 9 Avenue SE; 17 Avenue SE concurrency begins |
| 9.7 | 6.0 | Cushing Bridge across the Bow River | |
| 10.3 | 6.4 | Deerfoot Trail (Highway 2) 17 Avenue SE | Partial cloverleaf interchange; Highway 2 exit 254; continues as 17 Avenue SE |
1.000 mi = 1.609 km; 1.000 km = 0.621 mi: Concurrency terminus

== See also ==
- Transportation in Calgary
