= Barlow Trail =

- Owner: City Of Calgary)
- Location: Calgary, Alberta
- Southern section
- Length: 8.7 km (5.4 mi)
- South end: Deerfoot Trail (Highway 2)
- Major junctions: Glenmore Trail
- North end: Deerfoot Trail (Highway 2) / Peigan Trail
- Central section
- Length: 11.6 km (7.2 mi)
- South end: 17 Avenue SE
- Major junctions: Memorial Drive; 16 Avenue NE (Highway 1); McKnight Boulevard
- North end: McCall Way
- Northern section
- Length: 3.8 km (2.4 mi)
- South end: Airport Road
- Major junctions: Airport Trail; Country Hills Boulevard
- North end: 128 Avenue NE

Barlow Trail is a major arterial road in Calgary, Alberta, that is composed of three parts: the southern section which runs from Deerfoot Trail near 130 Avenue SE to Deerfoot Trail at the intersection with Peigan Trail. The afore mentioned section is the central section which runs from 17 Avenue SE to McCall Way; and the northern section which runs from Airport Road (the main entrance into the Calgary International Airport) to 128 Avenue NE.

The central and northern sections of Barlow Trail is run roughly where the fifth meridian lies in the Dominion Land Survey. The road is named for Noel Barlow, a resident of Carseland, Alberta, Canada, who served as the ground crewman to Douglas Bader, a Royal Air Force flying ace in World War II.

== History ==
Barlow Trail used to be the main northern entrance into the city of Calgary and was a continuous roadway. It served as a portion of Alberta Highway 2 from the northern city limits to Blackfoot Trail, near the present location of the Max Bell Centre. At that point, Highway 2 followed Blackfoot Trail to 66 Avenue SE (present-day Glenmore Trail) before turning south on Macleod Trail, while Barlow Trail continued south along 26 Street SE. In the early 1970s, Highway 2 was diverted to the new freeway as part of the Blackfoot Trail Freeway (present-day Deerfoot Trail) construction, resulting in Barlow Trail becoming a rural road north of 112 Avenue NE (present-day Country Hills Boulevard) and being re-designated as Highway 2A. In the late 1970s, Deerfoot Trail was extended further south, resulting in the direct connection to Blackfoot Trail being removed in favour of using 17 Avenue SE, and Barlow Trail being realigned as part of the construction of the Peigan Trail interchange. As part of the construction, direct movement to 26 Avenue SE was removed in favour of the southern section of Barlow Trail accessing Deerfoot Trail, and subsequent traffic calming removed direct access south of 17 Avenue SE. In the 1980s, the city of Calgary annexed land north of the airport, resulting in the Highway 2A designation being removed.

Barlow Trail was the primary route to the Calgary International Airport until the 2001 completion of Airport Trail, where the primary north-south entrance to the airport was diverted to the Airport Trail via the Deerfoot Trail. Barlow Trail functioned as an alternate route to the airport until April 3, 2011, where the section of Barlow Trail between 48 Avenue NE and Airport Road was permanently closed in order to provide space for a new runway. In the late 2000s, as part of the construction of the northeast portion of Stoney Trail, access to Rocky View County was closed.

== Future ==
The section of Barlow Trail north of Country Hills Boulevard is being reconstructed and realigned as part of the Stonegate Landing business park development. Barlow Trail will be upgraded to an arterial road to 128 Avenue NE, and continue north as Barlow Crescent, where it will circle back to 128 Avenue NE and continue south as 36 Street NE.

== Major intersections ==
The entire route is in Calgary.

km	mi	Destinations	Notes
0.0	0.0	Deerfoot Trail (Highway 2)	Semi-directional T interchange; Highway 2 exit 240
0.9	0.56	114 Avenue SE	
2.3	1.4	Shepard Road	Trumpet interchange
4.1	2.5	Glenmore Trail	Split intersection; Diverging diamond interchange proposed
5.2	3.2	72 Avenue SE	
6.3	3.9	61 Avenue SE	
7.9	4.9	50 Avenue SE	
8.7	5.4	Deerfoot Trail (Highway 2) / Peigan Trail	Interchange; Highway 2 exit 251; at-grade access to Peigan Trail
5.5 km (3.4 mi) gap in Barlow Trail
0.0	0.0	17 Avenue SE / 26 Street SE	No connection with 26 Street SE; no eastbound entrance from 17 Avenue SE
5.2	3.2	Memorial Drive	Partial cloverleaf interchange
6.0	3.7	Centre Avenue E	
7.6	4.7	16 Avenue NE (Highway 1)	Cloverleaf interchange
9.3	5.8	32 Avenue NE	
10.5	6.5	McKnight Boulevard	
11.6	7.2	McCall Way	Roundabout
4.1 km (2.5 mi) gap in Barlow Trail
0.0	0.0	Airport Road – Calgary International Airport	
0.4	0.25	Airport Trail to Highway 2	Interchange
2.0	1.2	Country Hills Boulevard	
3.8	2.4	128 Avenue NE / Barlow Crescent	Continues as Barlow Crescent
1.000 mi = 1.609 km; 1.000 km = 0.621 mi: Closed/former; Incomplete access

== See also ==
- Transportation in Calgary
