= Langdon, Alberta =

Langdon
- Hamlet
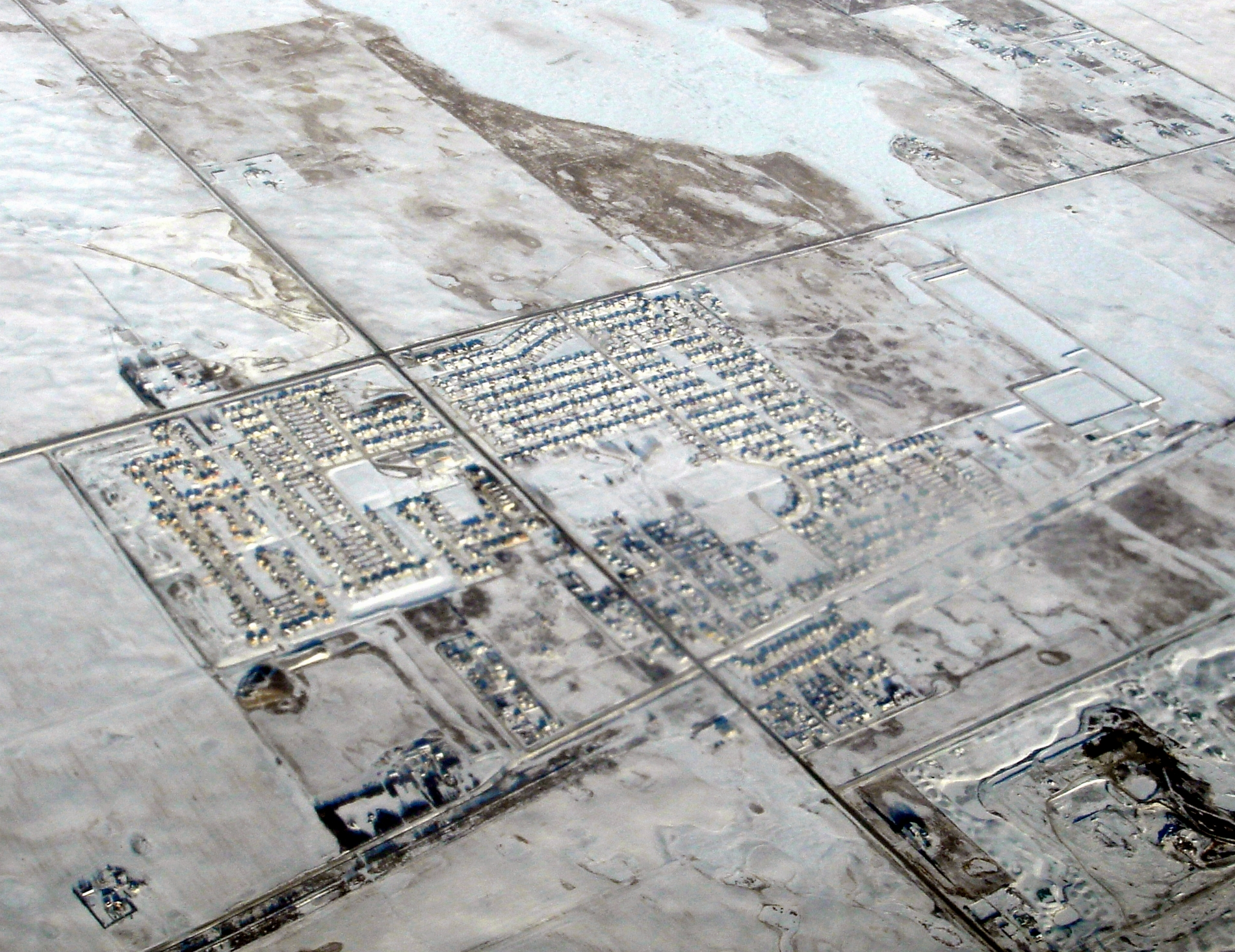
- Aerial view of Langdon in winter

- Location of Langdon in Alberta
- Coordinates: 50°58′21″N 113°40′36″W
- Country: Canada
- Province: Alberta
- Census division: No. 6
- Municipal district: Rocky View County
- Incorporated (village): August 31, 1907
- Dissolved: January 1, 1946

Government
  - Type: Unincorporated
  - Reeve: Greg Boehlke
  - Governing body: Rocky View County Council: Jerry Arshinoff; Rolly Ashdown; Margaret Bahcheli; Greg Boehlke; Liz Breakey; Lois Habberfield; Bruce Kendall; Eric Lowther; Earl Solberg

Area (2021)
  - Land: 9.26 km^{2} (3.58 sq mi)
- Elevation: 1,005 m (3,297 ft)

Population (2021)
  - Total: 5,497
  - Density: 593.4/km^{2} (1,537/sq mi)
- Time zone: UTC−06:00 (Alberta Time)
- Area codes: 403, 587, 825

Langdon is a hamlet in southern Alberta, Canada under the jurisdiction of Rocky View County. It previously held village status between August 31, 1907, and January 1, 1946.

Langdon is located 12 km (7.5 mi) east of the City of Calgary at the intersection of Highway 560 (Glenmore Trail) and Highway 797, approximately 6 km (3.7 mi) south of the Trans Canada Highway and 7 km (4.3 mi) north of Highway 22X. It has an elevation of 1,005 m (3,297 ft).

The hamlet is located in Census Division No. 6 and in the federal riding of Bow River. The hamlet is represented in federal government by Member of Parliament Martin Shields and in municipal government by Councillor Al Schule.

== History ==
Langdon was named for R.B. Langdon of Langdon & Shepard, a Canadian Pacific Railway subcontracting firm who built a section of the line just east of Calgary. He was born in Vermont in 1826 and worked on the railroad lines within at least ten US states, notably the St. Paul & Pacific Railroad in 1858. Langdon was a state senator in Minnesota from 1873 to 1881. The nearby Shepard station was named for his partner. Langdon was one of two people to turn the first sod in the settlement in 1882. A year later, a railway station was set up in a boxcar and named after him.

A post office was established on January 1, 1890, and a telegraph office in 1899. Langdon incorporated as a village on August 31, 1907. It subsequently dissolved on January 1, 1946, to become part of the Municipal District of Conrich No. 44.

== Demographics ==
Population history of Langdon
Year	Pop.	±%
1911	159	—
1916	161	+1.3%
1921	128	−20.5%
1926	94	−26.6%
1931	83	−11.7%
1936	101	+21.7%
1941	95	−5.9%
1951	77	−18.9%
1956	81	+5.2%
1961	98	+21.0%
1966	97	−1.0%
1971	109	+12.4%
1976	141	+29.4%
1981	199	+41.1%
1986	203	+2.0%
1991	279	+37.4%
1996	390	+39.8%
2001	1,685	+332.1%
2006	2,595	+54.0%
2011	4,211	+62.3%
2016	5,305	+26.0%
2021	5,497	+3.6%
Source: Statistics Canada

In the 2021 Census of Population conducted by Statistics Canada, Langdon had a population of 5,497 living in 1,759 of its 1,792 total private dwellings, a change of 3.6% from its 2016 population of 5,305. With a land area of 9.26 km^{2} (3.58 sq mi), it had a population density of 593.6/km^{2} (1,537.5/sq mi) in 2021.

The population of Langdon according to the 2018 municipal census conducted by Rocky View County is 5,364, a 9.5% increase from its 2013 municipal census population count of 4,897.

As of 2021, Langdon is 94.1% White, and 5.6% a visible minority. More specifically, the population is 29.3% English, 25.3% Scottish, 20.7% German, 19.2% Canadian, 18.2% Irish, and 10.3% Ukrainian. The largest visible minority population is Black, comprising 1.2% of Langdon's population.

40% of Langdon's population is Christian, and 59.3% is irreligious.

== Attractions ==
Langdon is home to The Track - a golf course formerly known as the Boulder Creek Golf Course. To the northwest of Langdon is the wetland waterfowl habitat Weed Lake. Langdon Days is an annual event hosted in the town during the summer baseball season and includes a parade down main street and a lot of good advertising for small businesses in the town.

== Education ==
Langdon School provides education to students in kindergarten through grade 9. Sarah Thompson School provides education to students from K-5. Horseshoe Crossing High School provides education to students in the grades 9-12.

== See also ==
- List of communities in Alberta
- List of designated places in Alberta
- List of former urban municipalities in Alberta
- List of hamlets in Alberta
