= Harvest Hills, Calgary =

Harvest Hills
- Neighbourhood
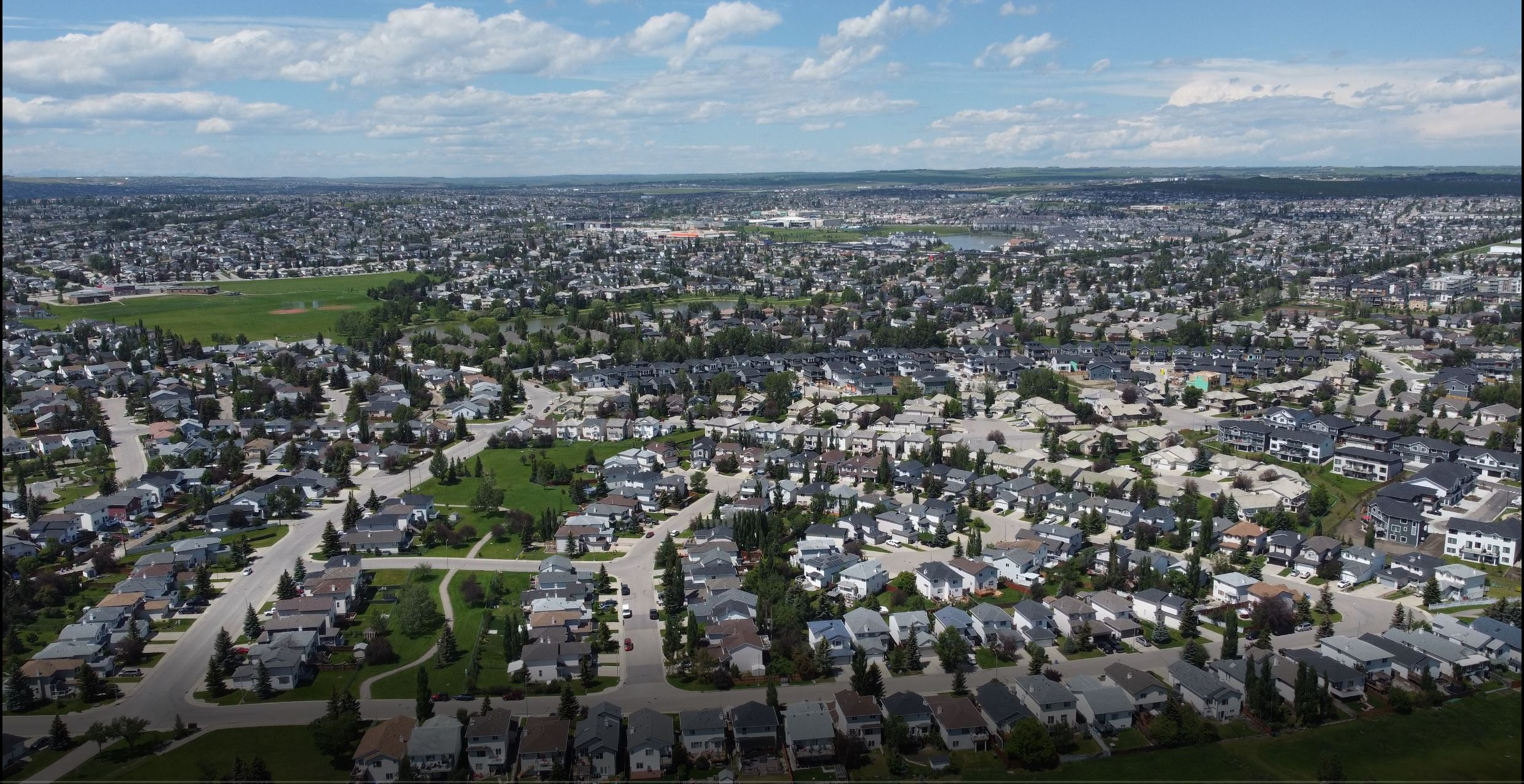

- Location of Harvest Hills in Calgary
- Coordinates: 51°08′52″N 114°03′22″W
- Country: Canada
- Province: Alberta
- City: Calgary
- Quadrant: NE
- Ward: 3
- Established: 1987
- Annexed: 1979

Government
  - Mayor: Jeromy Farkas
  - Administrative body: Calgary City Council
  - Councillor: Andrew Yule (Independent)

Area
  - Total: 2.2 km^{2} (0.85 sq mi)
- Elevation: 1,075 m (3,527 ft)

Population (2006)
  - Total: 7,455
  - Average Income: $78,949
- Website: Harvest Hills Community Association

Harvest Hills is a residential neighbourhood in the northeast quadrant of Calgary, Alberta. It is bounded by Deerfoot Trail to the east, by Beddington Trail to the south, by Country Hills Boulevard to the north and by Harvest Hills Boulevard to the west. The community contains a lake (the Harvest Hills lake). The Harvest Hills golf course, shut down in early 2016 with demolition planned for late 2016 and early 2017, is in the process of redevelopment (as of Oct. 3 2016) to add additional housing options in the northeast corner of the community.

Harvest Hills was established in 1987. But originally began development in the early 1980s as part of a multi community layout known as the Calgary North Area Structure Plan, The area was also a part of a similar plan known as the Country Hills Area Development Plan which was approved in a year after in 1981, however the project was halted due to the economic downfall at the time and that other communities such as Sandstone valley were still developing to the south of the area. Development reinitiated in 1987 with the earliest homes being built in 1989. The community is represented in the Calgary City Council by the Ward 3 councillor.

== Demographics ==
In the City of Calgary's 2012 municipal census, Harvest Hills had a population of 7,402 living in 2,569 dwellings, a -1.1% increase from its 2011 population of 7,485. With a land area of 2.2 km^{2} (0.85 sq mi), it had a population density of 3,360/km^{2} (8,710/sq mi) in 2012.

Residents in this community had a median household income of $78,949 in 2000, and there were 5% low income residents living in the neighbourhood. As of 2000, 13.1% of the residents were immigrants. A proportion of 6.2% of the buildings were condominiums or apartments, and 4.6% of the housing was used for renting.

== See also ==
- List of neighbourhoods in Calgary
