= Country Hills, Calgary =

Country Hills
- Neighbourhood
- Location of Country Hills in Calgary
- Coordinates: 51°08′37″N 114°04′20″W
- Country: Canada
- Province: Alberta
- City: Calgary
- Quadrant: NW
- Ward: 3
- Established: 1990
- Annexed: 1979

Government
  - Mayor: Jeromy Farkas
  - Administrative body: Calgary City Council
  - Councillor: Andrew Yule (Independent)
- Elevation: 1,105 m (3,625 ft)

Population (2006)
  - Total: 3,705
  - Average Income: $70,237
- Website: Northern Hills Community Association

Country Hills is a residential neighbourhood in the northwest quadrant of Calgary, Alberta. It is bounded to the north by the Country Hills Boulevard, to the south by Beddington Trail, and to the east by Harvest Hills Boulevard. To the southwest, it is bordered by the Country Hills golf course which began construction in 1989 and opened in 1992. The clubhouse along with the fully developed course opened in 1999. the area is also bordered by the West Nose Creek. The neighborhood is often mistaken with Country Hills Estates which lies to the south between Country Hills Golf Club and Beddington Trail which was developed a decade earlier. The new community of Country Hills Village is located in the northeast of the neighbourhood. Country Hills is a generally calm and quiet area.

Country Hills was established in 1990. It is represented in the Calgary City Council by the Ward 3 councillor.

== Demographics ==
In the City of Calgary's 2012 municipal census, Country Hills had a population of 3,728 living in 1,426 dwellings, a 0.2% increase from its 2011 population of 3,720. With a land area of 1.9 km^{2} (0.73 sq mi), it had a population density of 1,960/km^{2} (5,080/sq mi) in 2012. Also in the 2012 municipal census, Country Hills Village had a population of 2,615 living in 1,467 dwellings, an 11.7% increase from its 2011 population of 2,342. With a land area of 1 km^{2} (0.39 sq mi), it had a population density of 2,600/km^{2} (7,000/sq mi) in 2012.

Residents in this community had a median household income of $70,237 in 2000, and there were 7.4% low income residents living in the neighbourhood. As of 2000, 18.7% of the residents were immigrants. A proportion of 9.5% of the buildings were condominiums or apartments, and 6.8% of the housing was used for renting. Country Hills Library serves this community. It is located at 11950 Country Village Link N.E. in VIVO. (Formerly Cardel Place.)

== Crime ==
Crime Data
Year	Crime Rate (/100)
2018	3.7
2019	6.3
2020	4.0
2021	2.4
2022	4.2
2023	2.5

== Infrastructure ==
The future Green Line LRT will serve the area with a station set to be built at 96th Avenue N that has plans dating back to between the mid-1990s to the mid-2000s. Another station is planned at the current Northpointe bus terminal. An airport LRT link is also planned to be built that would connect the 96th Avenue station with Calgary International Airport and the future 88th Avenue station on the Blue Line LRT in Savanna.

== See also ==
- List of neighbourhoods in Calgary
