= Deerfoot Trail =

Freeway in Calgary, Canada

Deerfoot Trail
- Highway 2
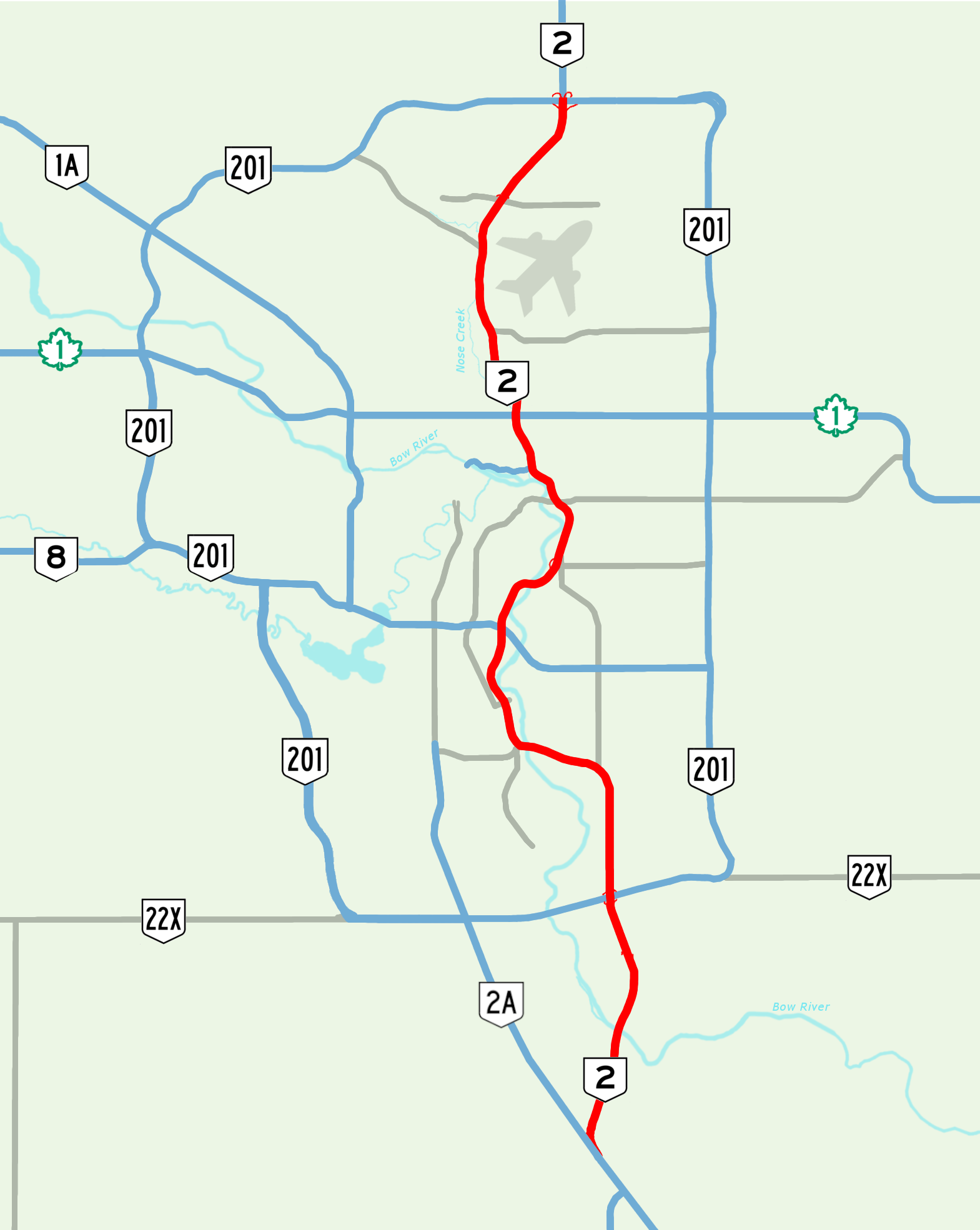
- Calgary area with Deerfoot Trail highlighted in red

Route information
- Maintained by Carmacks Enterprises Ltd.
- Length: 46.40 km (Note: Length is derived from the difference between the locations of the northbound Macleod Trail bridge over Deerfoot Trail (located at a mileage of 2.456 km on the section of Highway 2 known as "2:15") and the southbound Deerfoot Trail bridge over westbound Stoney Trail NE (located at a mileage of 48.859 km on section "2:15"), a distance of 46.403 km (28.8335 mi).) (28.83 mi)
- History: 1971 (first section open); 2003 (final section open); 2005 (freeway completed) (Note: Construction of the entire 46-kilometre length had been completed by 2003, but several signalized intersections remained in south Calgary until 2005.)

Major junctions
- South end: Hwy 2 / 2A near De Winton
- Stoney Trail in south Calgary Anderson Rd / Bow Bottom Tr Glenmore Trail Memorial Drive; 16 Avenue NE (Hwy 1) Beddington Trail; Stoney Trail near Balzac Township Road 262 in Balzac Yankee Valley Boulevard
- North end: Veterans Boulevard in Airdrie

Location
- Country: Canada
- Province: Alberta

Highway system
- Alberta Numbered Highway Network; List; Former
- Roads in Calgary

Deerfoot Trail is a 46.4-kilometre (28.8 mi) freeway segment of Highway 2 in Calgary, Alberta, Canada. It stretches the entire length of the city from south to north and links suburbs to downtown via Memorial Drive and 17 Avenue SE. The freeway begins south of Calgary where it splits from Macleod Trail, crosses the Bow River into city limits, and reaches the Stoney Trail ring road. Crisscrossing twice more with the river, it intersects Glenmore Trail and Memorial Drive; the former is a major east–west expressway while the latter is a freeway spur into downtown. In north Calgary, it crosses Highway 1 and passes Calgary International Airport. Then it crosses a second interchange with Stoney Trail, passes by CrossIron Mills, and goes through Airdrie before ending at Veterans Boulevard in north Airdrie. Highway 2 becomes the Queen Elizabeth II Highway as it continues north into Rocky View County towards Red Deer and Edmonton.

Originally called Blackfoot Trail Freeway upon the opening of the first section in 1971, it was renamed in 1974 to honour Deerfoot, a late-19th-century Siksika Nation (Blackfoot) long-distance runner known for his exceptional speed. Subsequent sections opened in 1975, 1980, 1982 and 2003. Deerfoot was not entirely a freeway until 2005 when the final of four at-grade intersections in southeast Calgary was converted to an interchange. Well known for its frequent rush hour congestion and collisions, traffic levels have steadily increased as Calgary's population has tripled to over 1.3 million since 1971. The mostly six-lane freeway is Alberta's busiest road with volume reaching over 151,000 vehicles per day at Memorial Drive in 2025, twice that for which it was designed. The Government of Alberta has been financially responsible for the highway since 2000 but now seeks to offload maintenance and future improvement costs to the city of Calgary. The two parties remain at odds over who should operate the road in the long-term but completed a joint study in 2021 that offered long and short-term recommendations. A four-year, $800 million project began in 2023 which will twin the Ivor Strong Bridge, widen most six lane portions to eight lanes, and reconfigure several interchanges.

== Route description ==
=== Overview ===
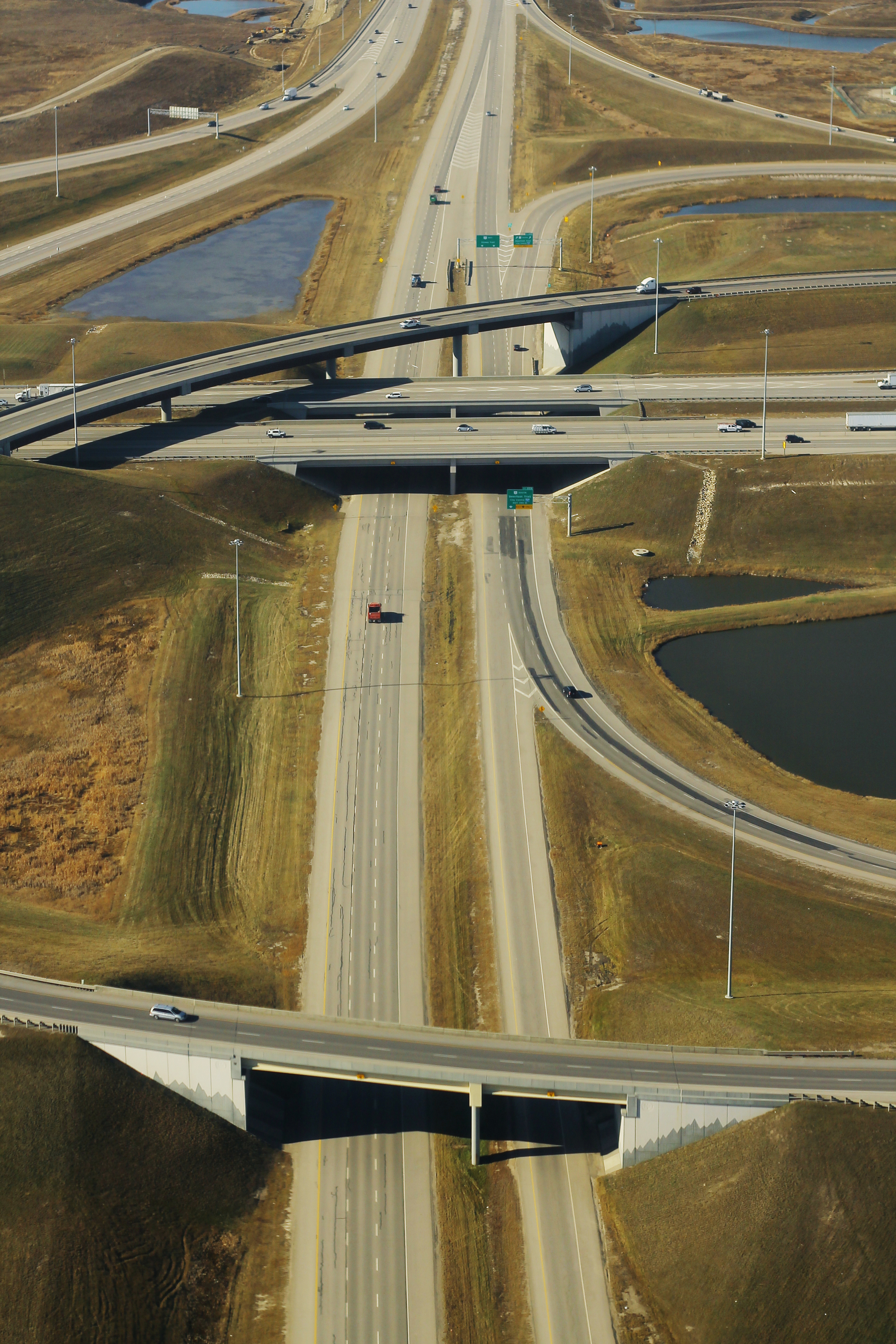
Looking west on Stoney Trail NE at its interchange with Deerfoot Trail

As a segment of Highway 2, Deerfoot Trail is a core route of the National Highway System and a key international corridor. It is also part of Calgary's Primary Goods Movement Network and is identified as a skeletal road in the city's Transportation Plan, a limited-access route important for long distance travellers, and is the only route that stretches the entire length of the city from north to south. From its split with Highway 2A (Macleod Trail) near the hamlet of De Winton in the south, it runs north to Stoney Trail at Calgary's northern city limit where it becomes the Queen Elizabeth II Highway. The freeway roughly bisects the city, though it lies entirely east of Centre Street which officially marks the boundary between the east and west side of the city. From its southern terminus until Memorial Drive, Deerfoot approximates the course of the Bow River. Initially the freeway is on the east side, then crosses to the west bank, and finally back to the east before the river and Memorial Drive veer west at Inglewood towards downtown. Most of the road's northern half parallels Nose Creek, a tributary of the Bow.

Deerfoot is a divided freeway for its entire 46.4-kilometre length, ranging from four to ten lanes wide. The northbound and southbound lanes are separated by an approximately 15-metre (49 ft) wide depressed grass median near De Winton, which narrows and becomes a combination of Jersey and constant-slope barriers through most of south Calgary before returning to grass of varying widths from 17 Avenue SE to the north terminus. In north Calgary the grass median is supplemented by 10.75 km (6.7 mi) of high-tension cable barriers (HTCB) that were added in 2007, virtually eliminating the risk of serious median collisions. It was the first major HTCB installation in Canada. The freeway has a posted speed limit of 110 km/h (68 mph) from its origin at Highway 2A until just after the first Bow River crossing, after which the limit is reduced to 100 km/h (62 mph) for the next 34 km (21 mi) through most of Calgary until Beddington Trail in the northeast where the limit returns to 110 km/h. The entire route is paved with asphalt, except for a 12 km (7.5 mi) concrete section in south Calgary.

The Department of Transportation and Economic Corridors, the department within the Government of Alberta tasked with and responsible for operating and maintaining the roads and highways within the provincial highway network, signed a contract with Carmacks Enterprises for the maintenance of Deerfoot Trail from Stoney Trail in south Calgary to the northern city limit. The province intends to return control of the freeway to the city, but it is desirable for the city to avoid the significant maintenance and rehabilitation costs associated with the freeway and have the road remain under provincial control for as long as possible. Former Calgary mayor Rod Sykes said, "I wouldn’t take on the problems of the Deerfoot if I were at City Hall now."

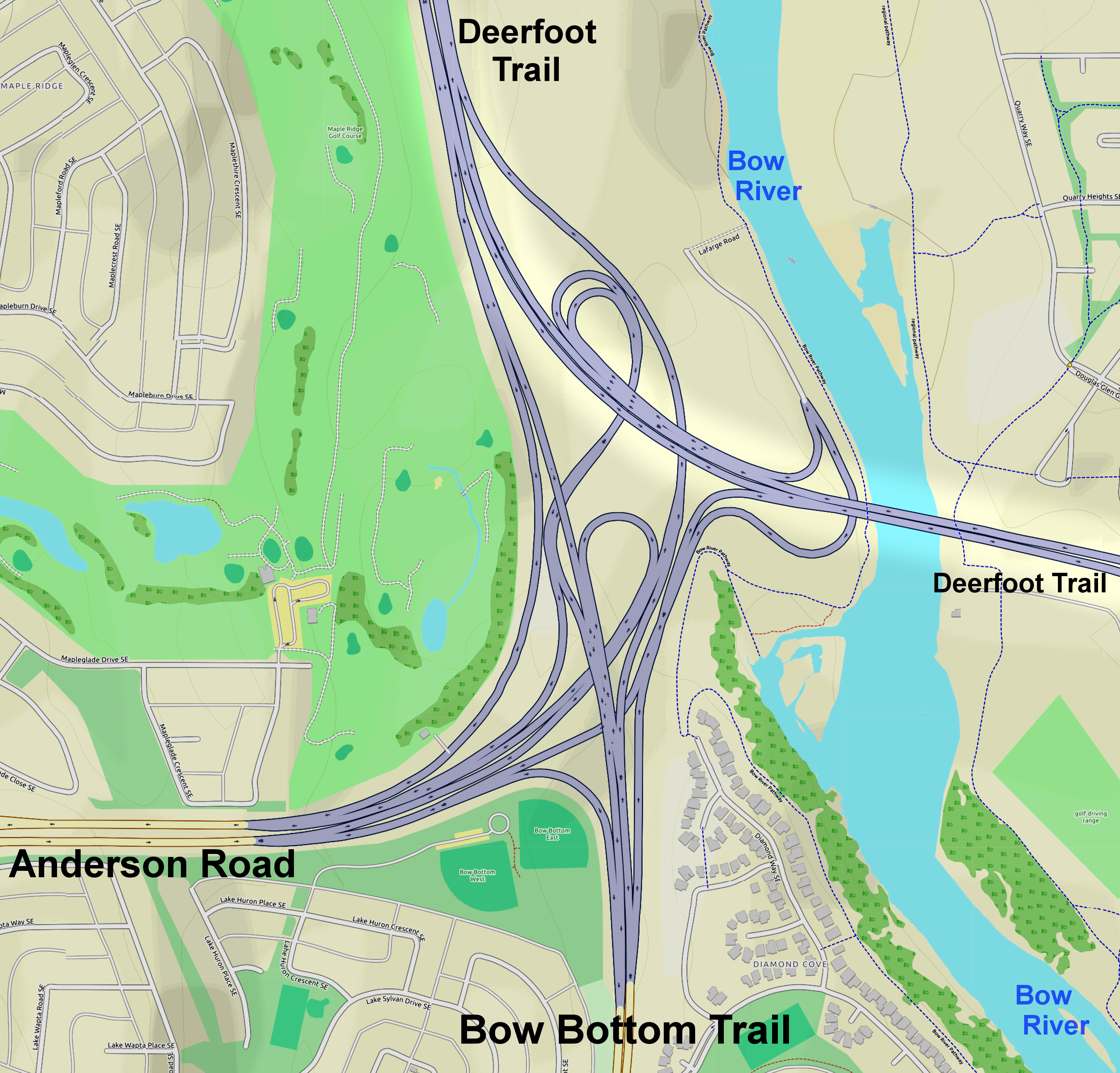
The complex interchange of Deerfoot Trail, Bow Bottom Trail and Anderson Road is often congested, as Deerfoot traffic is reduced to two lanes each way. Maps were published in the Calgary Herald to assist drivers with navigating the interchange when it opened in late 1982.

=== South Calgary ===
Deerfoot Trail begins as a rural freeway with 2 northbound lanes and 3 southbound lanes near De Winton then immediately curves northeast from Macleod Trail and descend to an interchange with Dunbow Road and across the Bow River. It crosses the river on twin 236-metre (774 ft) bridges constructed over an environmentally sensitive area of the valley. Rising from the river, the freeway enters Calgary limits and its southern suburban neighbourhoods of Cranston and Seton to which access is provided by a partial cloverleaf interchange while also becoming 6 main lanes, 3 in both directions. A massive junction at the Stoney Trail ring road immediately follows, with signage recommending that traffic destined for the International Airport, Edmonton, and Medicine Hat use eastbound Stoney Trail as a bypass. Continuing north of Stoney Trail as an eight lane freeway, Deerfoot passes between the communities of McKenzie Lake and McKenzie Towne, crossing 130 Avenue SE to the south terminus of Barlow Trail. It then reduces to six lanes, curving to the west through the neighbourhoods of Douglasdale and Douglasglen across the Bow River on the Ivor Strong Bridge, named after John Ivor Strong who served as Chief Commissioner for Calgary until 1971.

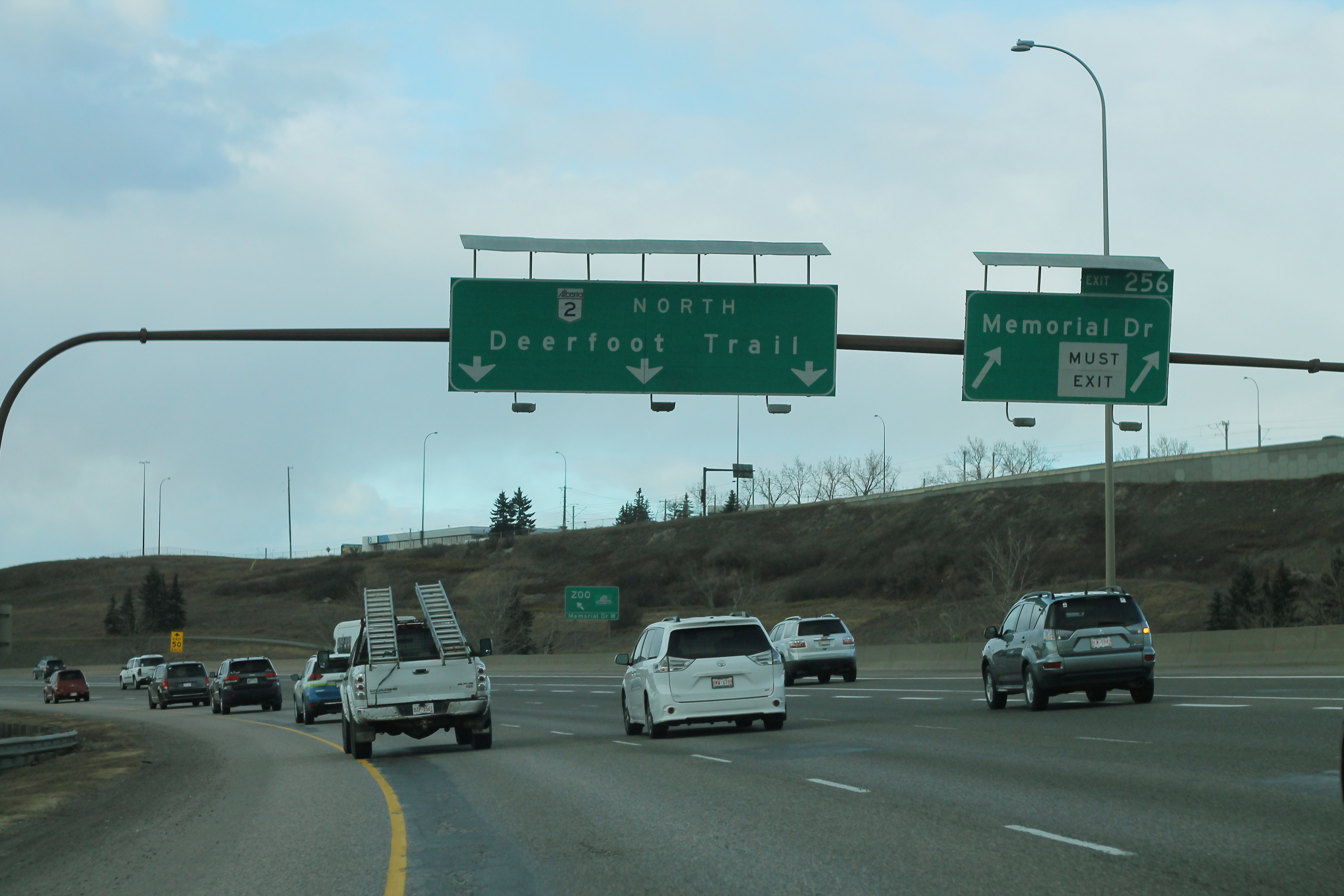
Northbound Deerfoot Trail curving at Memorial Drive and the Northeast Line of the CTrain. The interchange was constructed as part of the second Deerfoot segment that opened in 1975, and the CTrain bridges were constructed in 2000.

Immediately after the second river crossing, Deerfoot merges with the major routes of Anderson Road and Bow Bottom Trail, often a point of congestion at rush hour. In both directions, traffic through the currently being improved interchange is reduced from three lanes to two. The freeway curves north along the river's west bank to cross Southland Drive, paralleling Blackfoot Trail near the community of Acadia for a short time. North of Acadia, the freeway bisects a large area of commercial development for several kilometres before reaching a major interchange at Glenmore Trail. The interchange is generally identified as the second of two major congestion points on Deerfoot in south Calgary that are currently being fixed, the so called "Glenmore squeeze", where traffic is reduced to two lanes each way over Glenmore. Deerfoot turns sharply to the east and crosses the Bow River one last time on the Calf Robe Bridge, named after a Siksika Nation elder. Veering back to the north, it follows the river's east bank, passing by Peigan Trail to a partial cloverleaf interchange at 17 Avenue SE, passing the neighbourhoods of Dover and Southview. Deerfoot meets Memorial Drive, a major freeway spur into downtown, near Pearce Estate Wetland, Wilder Institute/Calgary Zoo and the Max Bell Centre, and continues into north Calgary while the Bow River turns west towards downtown.

=== North Calgary ===
In north Calgary, the freeway climbs along the east side of Nose Creek and becomes eight main lanes, a tributary of the Bow River. From Memorial Drive, it passes the Vista Heights neighbourhood to 16 Avenue NE (Highway 1/Trans-Canada Highway); this section has been largely unchanged since its completion in 1975. The eight lane freeway enters light commercial development north of 32 Avenue NE and passes McKnight Boulevard, providing access to airport-related light industrial areas as well as Nose Hill Park, which is visible to the west. Access to Huntington Hills and Deerfoot Mall are then provided by an interchange at 64 Avenue NE. Beddington Trail splits to the northwest from Deerfoot, following Nose Creek into a large residential area of north Calgary that includes the neighbourhoods of Country Hills, Panorama Hills, and Hidden Valley. The speed limit on Deerfoot increases to 110 km/h as development tapers in an increasingly rural area of north Calgary. After West Nose Creek Park, an interchange with Airport Trail serves as the primary access for Calgary International Airport, and to the west, the neighbourhood of Harvest Hills via 96 Avenue NE. after the northbound entreance to Airport Trail, the freeway reduces back to six lanes, and north of Airport Trail, curves northeast through light commercial areas across Country Hills Boulevard and ends at an interchange with Stoney Trail. It continues north to Airdrie as the Queen Elizabeth II Highway.

=== Traffic and collisions ===
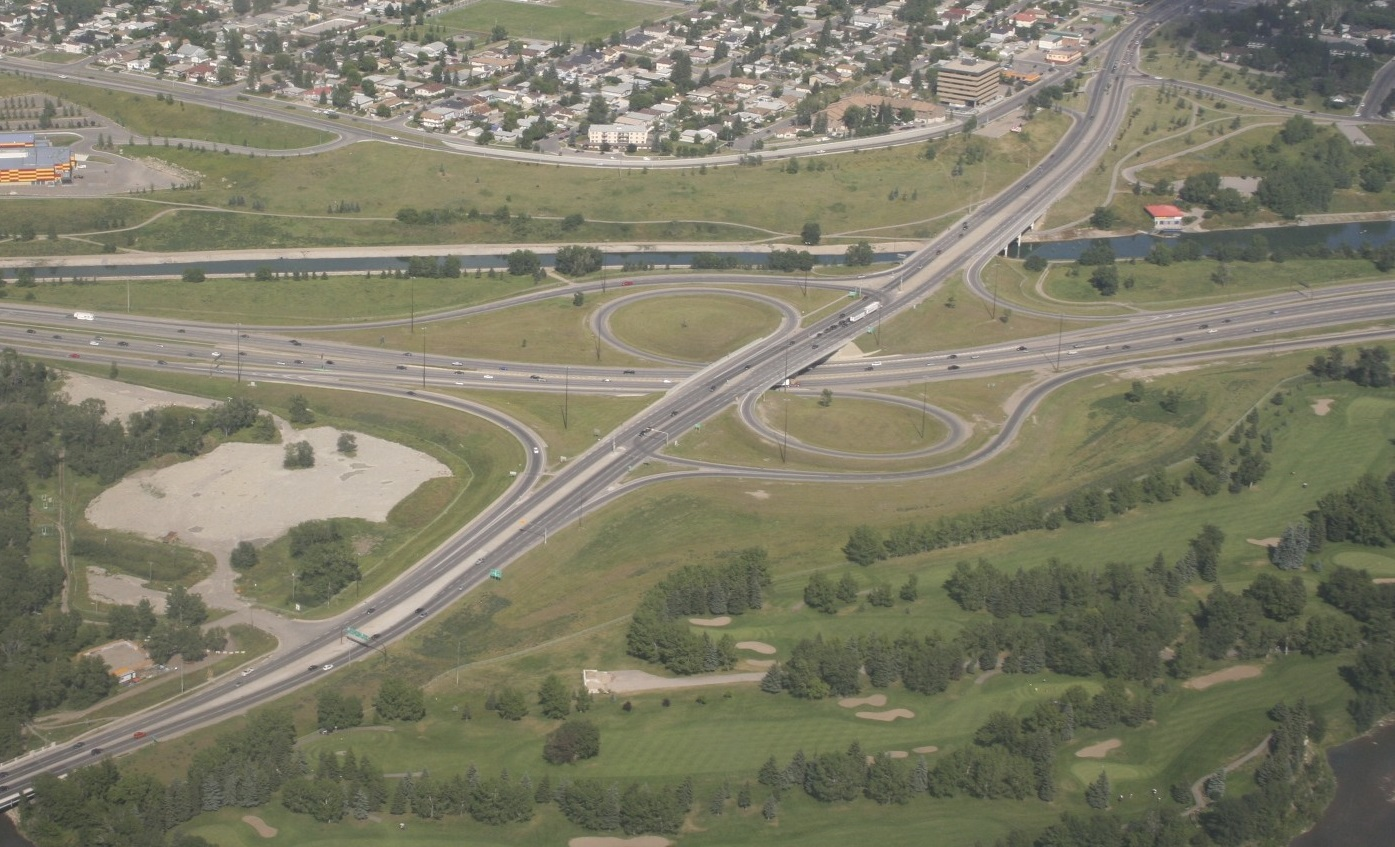
Partial cloverleaf interchange at 17 Avenue SE in south Calgary

Deerfoot Trail is Alberta's busiest highway by a significant margin over Glenmore Trail, with peak daily congestion lasting as many as four hours. Its most travelled stretch is between Memorial Drive and 16 Avenue NE (Trans-Canada Highway) as traffic from Calgary's northern and eastern suburbs converge to travel via Memorial Drive into downtown, in addition to traffic transiting the city and other intra-city trips. The freeway was designed to carry approximately 65,000 vehicles per day but peaked at 173,500 vehicles between Memorial Drive and Highway 1 in 2019. Traffic has since reduced slightly to approximately 151,000 vehicles per day in 2025 as Stoney Trail has taken a larger share of the load since the opening of its southeast leg in 2013, and completion of the full ring road in 2023. In a 2016 study, Calgary ranked tenth in traffic congestion among major Canadian cities, with drivers spending nearly 16 hours of the year in standstill traffic.

The excessive volume of traffic on Deerfoot Trail is a contributing factor to the 10,000 collisions recorded between 2002 and 2007, including 24 fatalities. Constable Jeff Klatt of the Calgary Police Service stated that there is a "consensus among police officers that it’s dangerous to do traffic stops" on Deerfoot Trail. A 1993 incident in which a stolen vehicle struck and killed a police officer on Deerfoot was the catalyst for the acquisition of a helicopter by the Calgary Police Service. 2013 statistics confirmed that Deerfoot Trail had more crashes and traffic jams than any other road in Calgary. Deerfoot has many entrances and exits in close proximity which exacerbates problems, but some have attributed a portion of the congestion to driver error. Constable Jim Lebedeff of the Calgary Police Service stated, "a lot of people don’t understand, or don’t want to understand, how to merge properly." 30% of respondents to a 2016 poll stated that the main reason they avoid Deerfoot Trail is because they do not feel safe on the freeway.

In 2015, plans for improvements to Deerfoot Trail near Southland Drive were cancelled and a study was initiated to determine the best course of action to begin improving the freeway. The Calf Robe Bridge is also prone to collisions as its concrete deck becomes slick in cold weather, and large curves precede and follow the bridge. A 1996 crash on the bridge claimed the life of a teenager when her northbound car struck the rear of a fire truck parked in the left shoulder attending to an accident in the southbound lanes. Poor visibility due to the curve prior to the bridge was a contributing factor in a successful lawsuit by the girl's family against Calgary.

Traffic volumes (Note: Alberta Transportation publishes yearly traffic volume data for provincial highways. The table compares the AADT at several locations along Deerfoot Trail using data from 2001, 2010 and 2019, expressed as an average daily vehicle count over the course of one year (AADT). Each value is the AADT between the listed road and the next road junction to the north.)
Location		De Winton	Stoney; Tr SE	Anderson; Road	Glenmore; Trail	Memorial; Drive	32 Ave NE	Beddington; Trail	Country; Hills Blvd
Traffic volume	2001		18,860	93,830	104,060	138,960	110,030	55,970	49,440
Traffic volume	2010	28,280	62,180	129,690	120,130	158,050	140,570	79,820	62,080
Traffic volume	2019	38,690	84,930	145,270	132,790	173,500	162,330	113,080	83,690
Traffic volume	2023	33,740	90,640	119,240	108,810	145,400	137,480	94,060	73,280

=== Interchanges ===
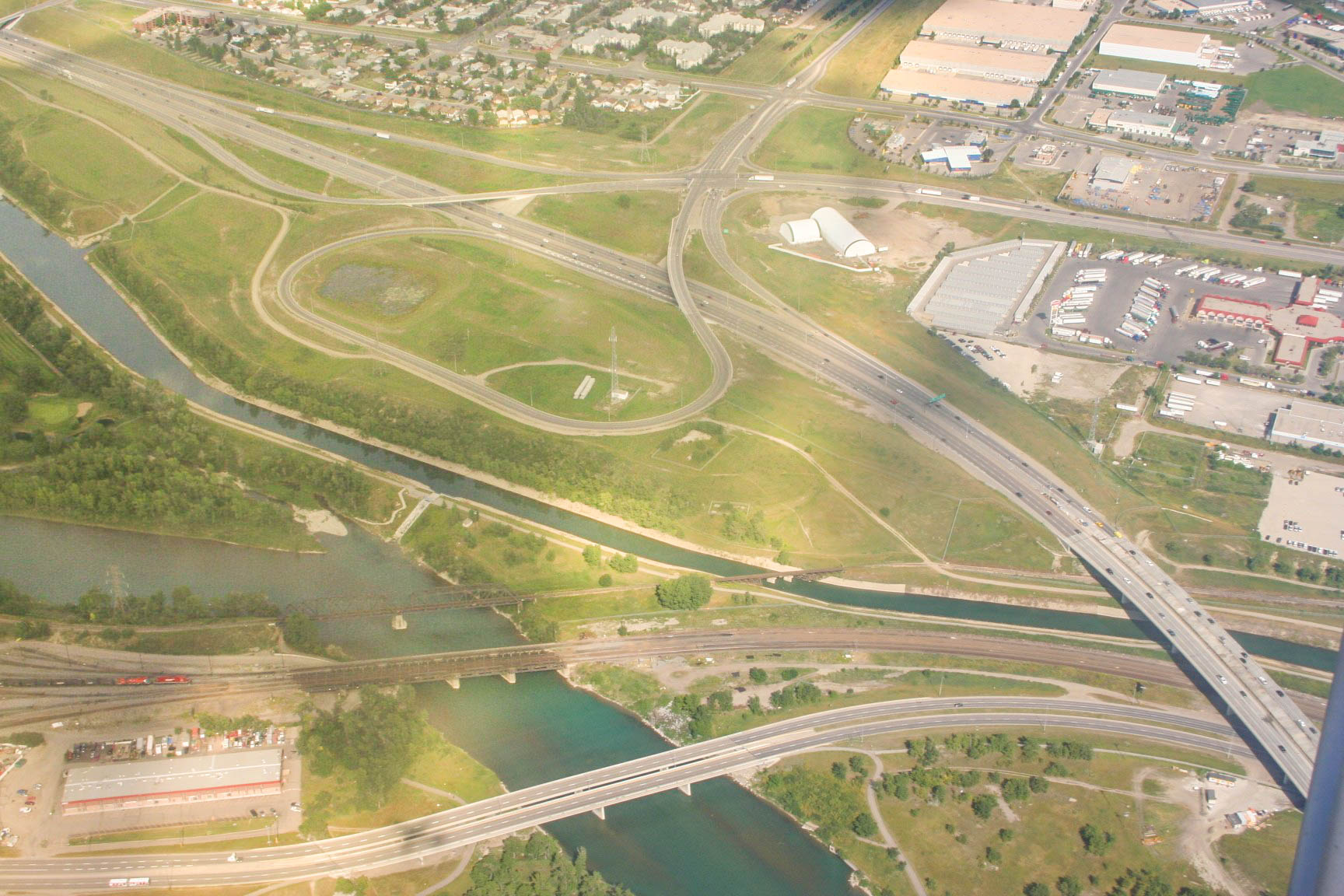
The ramp from westbound Peigan Trail to southbound Deerfoot Trail was modified in 2009 to loop back upon itself, allowing for a greater merge distance before crossing Ogden Road and the Bow River

The freeway features 21 interchanges of varying design. The most recent interchanges to be constructed at the north and south ends of the freeway are more consistently of the partial cloverleaf type, a design highly used in Alberta as it is a desirable compromise between cost and capacity. The two interchanges with Stoney Trail are cloverstack interchanges, where high capacity directional flyovers carry traffic turning left for movements with more traffic, and loop ramps service lesser used left turn movements. Older and less efficient designs are used at Deerfoot's intersections with both Glenmore Trail and Highway 1. The junction with Glenmore is an incomplete cloverleaf interchange; traffic northbound on Deerfoot does not have direct access to westbound Glenmore and one must first exit to the east, proceed through a traffic light behind Calgary Auto Mall, and enter Glenmore Trail from the north side. At Highway 1, a split diamond interchange significantly slows east-west traffic even outside of peak hours, because all left turn movements must pass through three sets of traffic lights. This outdated interchange was Calgary's most dangerous road junction in 2011, with 234 crashes recorded.

== History ==
=== Predecessor highways ===
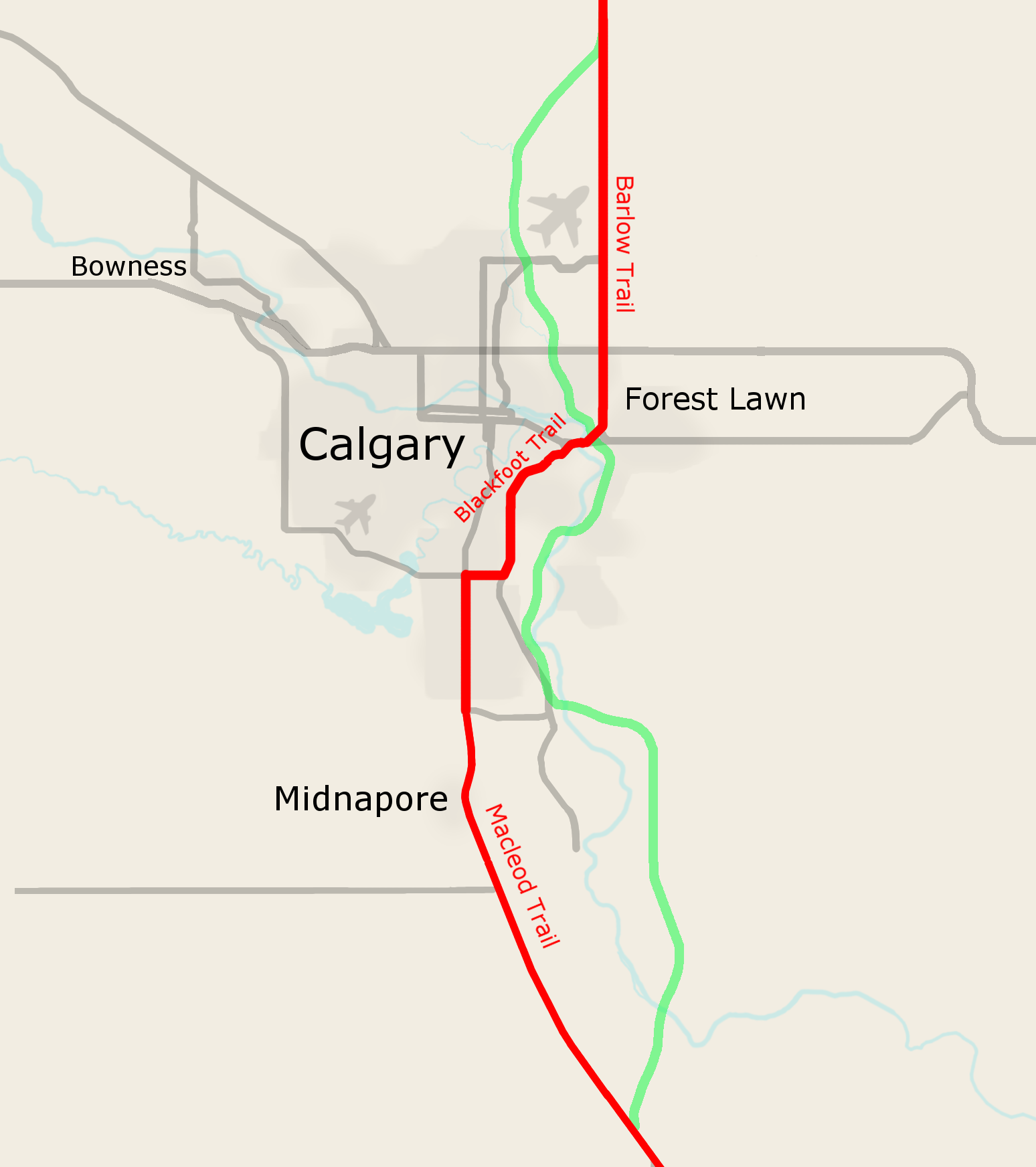
Highway 2 in Calgary in the late 1960s (red line) when it followed the alignment of present-day Macleod, Glenmore, and Blackfoot Trails, 17 Avenue SE, and Barlow Trail. The green line represents the present-day alignment of Deerfoot Trail.

Prior to the completion of Deerfoot Trail, the historic alignment of Highway 2 in south Calgary was along Macleod Trail as an extension of 4 Street, parallel to a branch of the Canadian Pacific Railway from Calgary to Macleod. Macleod Trail has since been designated Highway 2A, on a routing largely the same as the original. It is now a busy expressway connecting Midnapore and other southwestern suburbs to downtown. The southernmost portion of the route from Highway 22X to De Winton would continue to serve as Highway 2 until completion of a Deerfoot Trail extension from its then southernmost point at the neighbourhood of Cranston to De Winton in 2003.

In north Calgary, Highway 2 was originally composed of four present-day routes: Edmonton Trail, 41 Avenue, 48 Avenue, and Barlow Trail. Edmonton Trail is now a busy urban street on the west bank of Nose Creek through the neighbourhood of Highland Park, but its alignment in the 1920s had it curving to the northeast across the creek along present-day 41 Avenue to 48 Avenue where it continued east past the airport to Barlow Trail and north to Edmonton as Highway 1, later renamed to Highway 2.

By the 1960s, Highway 2 had been realigned to follow Macleod Trail until turning east at Glenmore Trail before continuing north on Blackfoot Trail, veering to the northeast, and crossing the Bow River to join Barlow Trail to the north city limit. The former Edmonton Trail was re-signed as Highway 2A. As the airport continued to expand, 48 Avenue was reduced to an airport service road after the construction of McKnight Boulevard. Long after the completion and opening of Deerfoot Trail and its signing as Highway 2, the segment of Barlow Trail north of McKnight Blvd was closed in 2011 to allow construction of a new 14,000-foot (4,300 m) runway at Calgary International Airport.

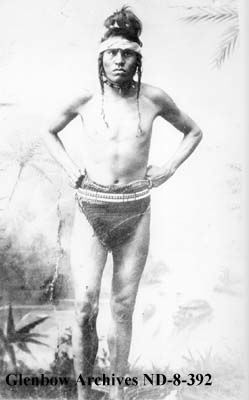
Deerfoot, also known as Scabby Dried Meat, was a prominent runner in the Calgary area before 1890.

=== Early plans and construction ===
Due to its quickly rising population in the 1960s, Calgary initiated planning for the construction of an extensive freeway and expressway network that included numerous north–south and east–west routes. Many of these routes were ultimately not developed into freeways, but a 1967 transportation study planned for a major north–south freeway running along the west side of the Calgary Airport across the Bow River into Inglewood, remaining west of the Bow River through present-day Fish Creek Provincial Park. Initially called the Blackfoot Trail Freeway, the first segment stretched from the northern city boundary (then near Deerfoot's present-day split with Beddington Trail) to 16 Avenue NE, opening in 1971. It was named after a historic route that approximated the location of present-day Memorial Drive across Nose Creek, between Barlow Trail and the community of St. George's Heights, now the location of the Wilder Institute/Calgary Zoo. This trail appears on Calgary maps as early as 1891.

In 1974, signs were unveiled renaming the road after a Siksika Nation long-distance runner nicknamed Deerfoot. Several namesakes had been considered, including James Gladstone, Old Sun, and Walking Buffalo. In 1884, Deerfoot became known in the Calgary area as a great talent and won races against runners from as far away as Europe. Controversy arose when Deerfoot won a race but his opponent was credited with the victory. At a rematch to settle the dispute, the same result occurred. Unhappy with the result, his attitude began to change; he committed theft from a cabin, and was later the subject of a massive manhunt. He spent time in and out of police custody for various crimes, before dying of tuberculosis while in prison for assault. He had reportedly been receiving medical treatment for the disease since his arrival to the prison.

In December 1974, Premier Peter Lougheed reiterated his opposition to the planned routing for the southern portion of Deerfoot Trail, which would take the freeway along the west side of the Bow River through Fish Creek Park. Lougheed acknowledged that diverting the freeway to the east would be significantly more expensive, but was firm on protecting and preserving Fish Creek as an urban park. The revised alignment took the freeway approximately 1 km (0.62 mi) east of the river through present-day Douglasdale, McKenzie Towne, and McKenzie Lake. Bow Bottom Trail, a major arterial road, was built in the wide right of way that had been reserved for Deerfoot Trail.

A second section extending the road further south to 17 Avenue SE opened on 20 January 1975, at a cost of $35 million. The new pavement continued south alongside Nose Creek and was originally to carry on straight across the river into Inglewood, but residents of the neighbourhood fought adamantly against construction of the freeway in their community. City Hall conceded, resulting in the present-day alignment that keeps the freeway east of the Bow River as it passes downtown.

=== Completion ===
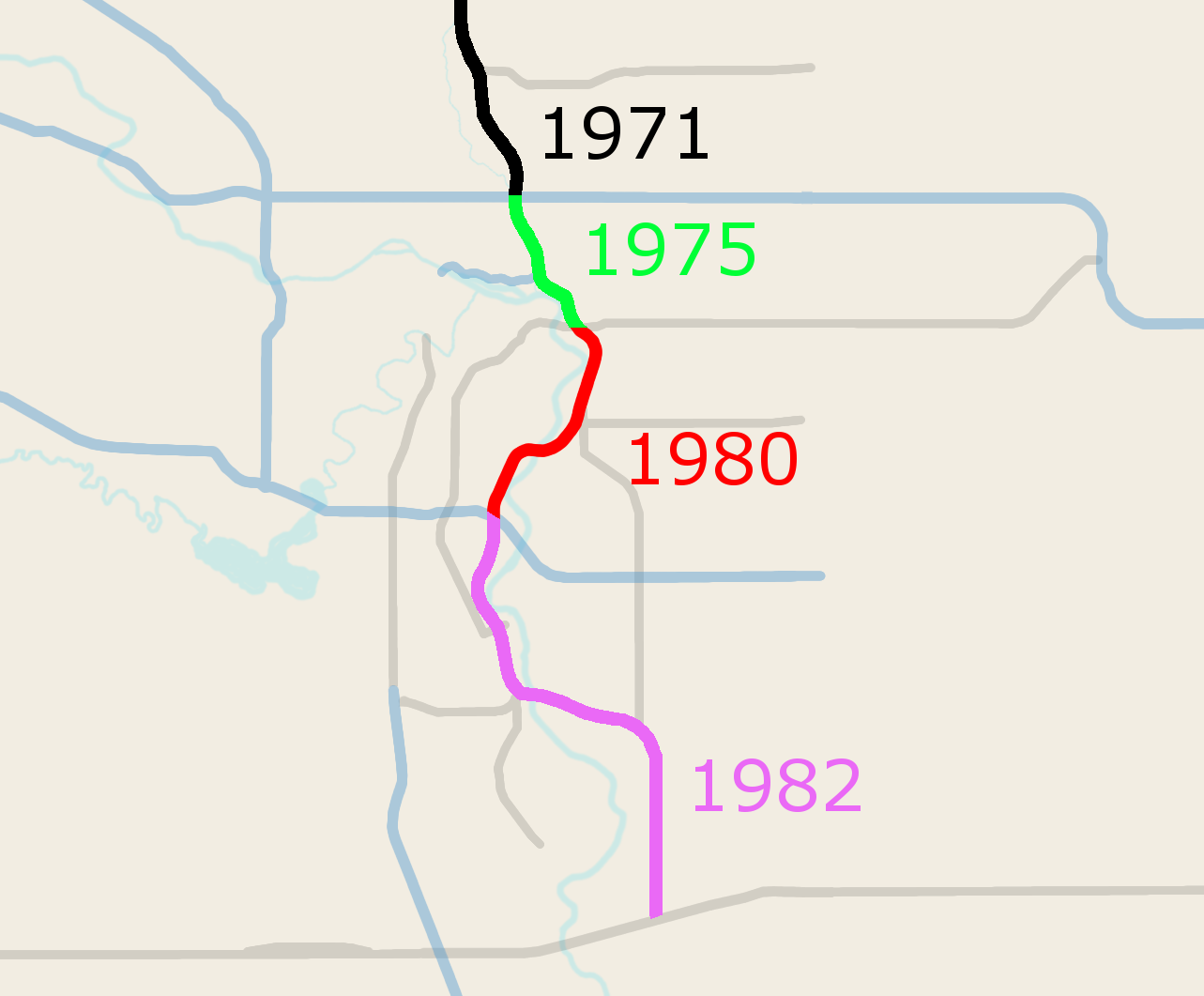
Deerfoot Trail in 1982 after it had been extended to Highway 22X in south Calgary.

On 2 December 1980, an extension of Deerfoot Trail south to Glenmore Trail was opened, able to handle up to 80,000 vehicles per day. It was advertised as an alternative north–south route to the nearby Blackfoot Trail. Construction of the $70 million 6.5 km (4.0 mi) extension took more than two years, and was described as "badly needed" by mayor Ralph Klein. The new concrete road included the Calf Robe Bridge over the Bow River and an interchange at 43 Avenue SE, now called Peigan Trail. The next section, then intended to be the final segment, extended Deerfoot to Highway 22X (now Stoney Trail) on the altered alignment east of the river. It opened on 22 November 1982 at a cost of $165 million. It featured interchanges at Southland Drive and Anderson Road/Bow Bottom Trail. A second crossing of the Bow River on the Ivor Strong Bridge took Deerfoot to an at-grade intersection with 24 Street, and a signalized intersection at Barlow Trail which had been extended south from Glenmore Trail as part of the Deerfoot project.

Highway 2 was realigned in Calgary to follow Macleod Trail north to Anderson Road, then east on Anderson Road to the new interchange at Deerfoot Trail where it turned north to follow Deerfoot to the city limit near the airport. Plans to add a third level flyover at Memorial Drive by 1987 did not come to fruition. The original configuration of the interchange was modified in 1983 to add a loop ramp for traffic turning northbound onto Deerfoot Trail from eastbound Memorial. A new ramp was also constructed for traffic turning west onto Memorial from northbound Deerfoot, passing underneath eastbound Memorial before joining westbound Memorial from the left.

The province took over responsibility from the City of Calgary in 2000 to upgrade the route to a freeway and render the CANAMEX Corridor a contiguous route through the city, after which they intended to return the road to the city. In 2003, a $100 million extension was completed extending Deerfoot Trail from its junction with Highway 22X to its present terminus near De Winton. During planning, the segment had been temporarily designated as Highway 2X. Prior to the 10-kilometre (6.2 mi) project, Deerfoot was effectively disconnected from the rest of Highway 2. Traffic continuing south to Fort Macleod proceeded west on a two lane bridge carrying Highway 22X over the Bow River, before turning south onto Macleod Trail, which was then designated as Highway 2. The section of Highway 22X over the river became Stoney Trail (Highway 201) in 2013, and a second bridge was completed in 2007 to carry the westbound lanes, while the original bridge built in 1974 carries the eastbound lanes.

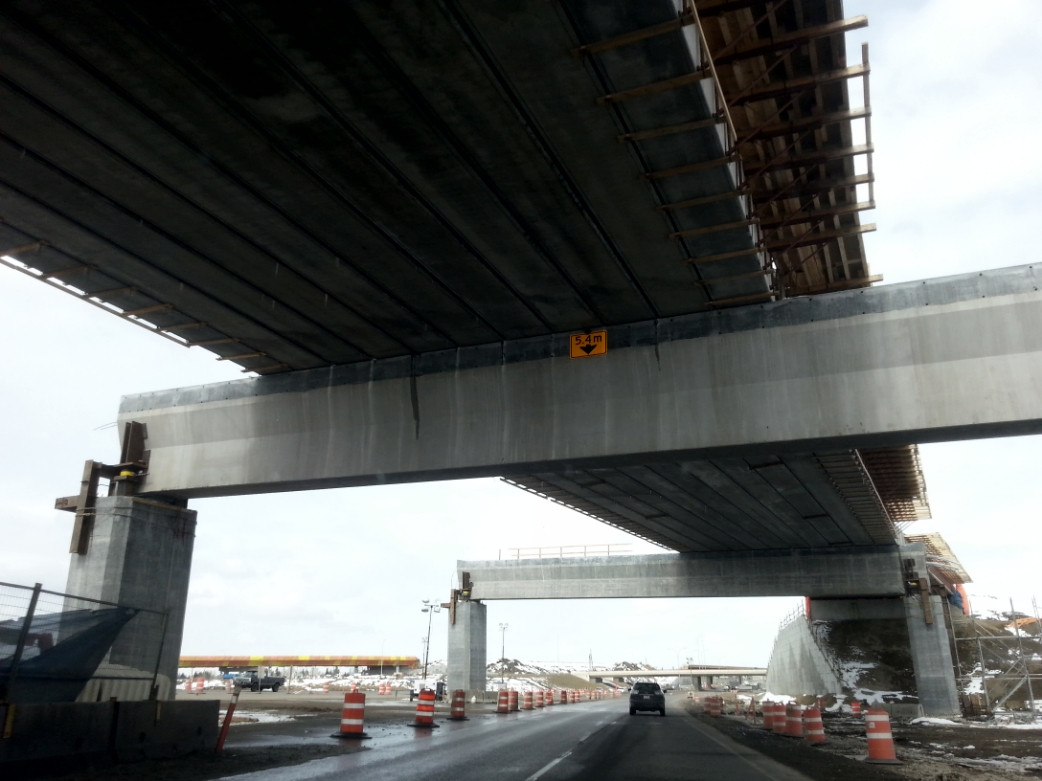
During construction of southeast Stoney Trail in 2013, two new bridges were built across Deerfoot Trail, including this structure spanning the northbound lanes

Interchanges were constructed at Barlow Trail, 130 Avenue SE, McKenzie Towne Boulevard, Cranston Avenue, and Dunbow Road between 2000 and 2004. The last set of traffic lights was removed in 2005 upon completion of the interchange at Douglasdale Boulevard, making the entire length of Deerfoot Trail a freeway.

=== Since freeway completion ===
In an effort to reduce head-on collisions caused by vehicles crossing over the grass median in north Calgary, the installation of high tension cable barriers was completed in the first half of 2007. In 2009, modifications were made to the interchange of Peigan, Barlow, and Deerfoot Trails, built in 1979. The former westbound to southbound ramp left little distance for traffic to merge, causing bottlenecks. Due to that, the ramp was modified to first curve north and then loop back underneath itself, extending the merge distance before the three southbound lanes crossed Ogden Road and then the Bow River. In November 2009, construction of a major interchange at the northern terminus of Deerfoot Trail was completed, connecting it to the northeast and northwest sections of Stoney Trail.

In August 2013, 96 Avenue NE was extended to the east across West Nose Creek and the Canadian Pacific Railway tracks to meet the existing interchange at Deerfoot Trail and Airport Trail. It provided an alternative to Beddington Trail and Country Hills Boulveard for access to the neighbourhood of Harvest Hills. The project included a controversial $470,000 piece of public art, a 17-metre (56 ft) tall blue ring called "Travelling Light" that lies on the north side of 96 Avenue between the railway and Nose Creek. Highly visible from Deerfoot, the ring received national attention and was called "awful" and "terrible" by Calgary mayor Naheed Nenshi, and "an example of bureaucracy run amok" by Councillor Jyoti Gondek. The mostly negative feedback prompted Calgary to review its allocation of funds to public art on infrastructure projects. As part of Stoney Trail construction in 2013, Deerfoot Trail was upgraded between the most southerly Bow River crossing north and McKenzie Lake Boulevard. It was widened from four through lanes to six through lanes from Stoney Trail to the Bow River at Calgary's southern limit, and elevated directional ramps were added to the major interchange at Deerfoot and Stoney Trail to support significantly higher traffic levels. A braided ramp was constructed northbound between Cranston Avenue and Stoney Trail, preventing northbound traffic exiting to eastbound Stoney Trail from conflicting with Auburn Bay and Cranston traffic merging onto northbound Deerfoot Trail.

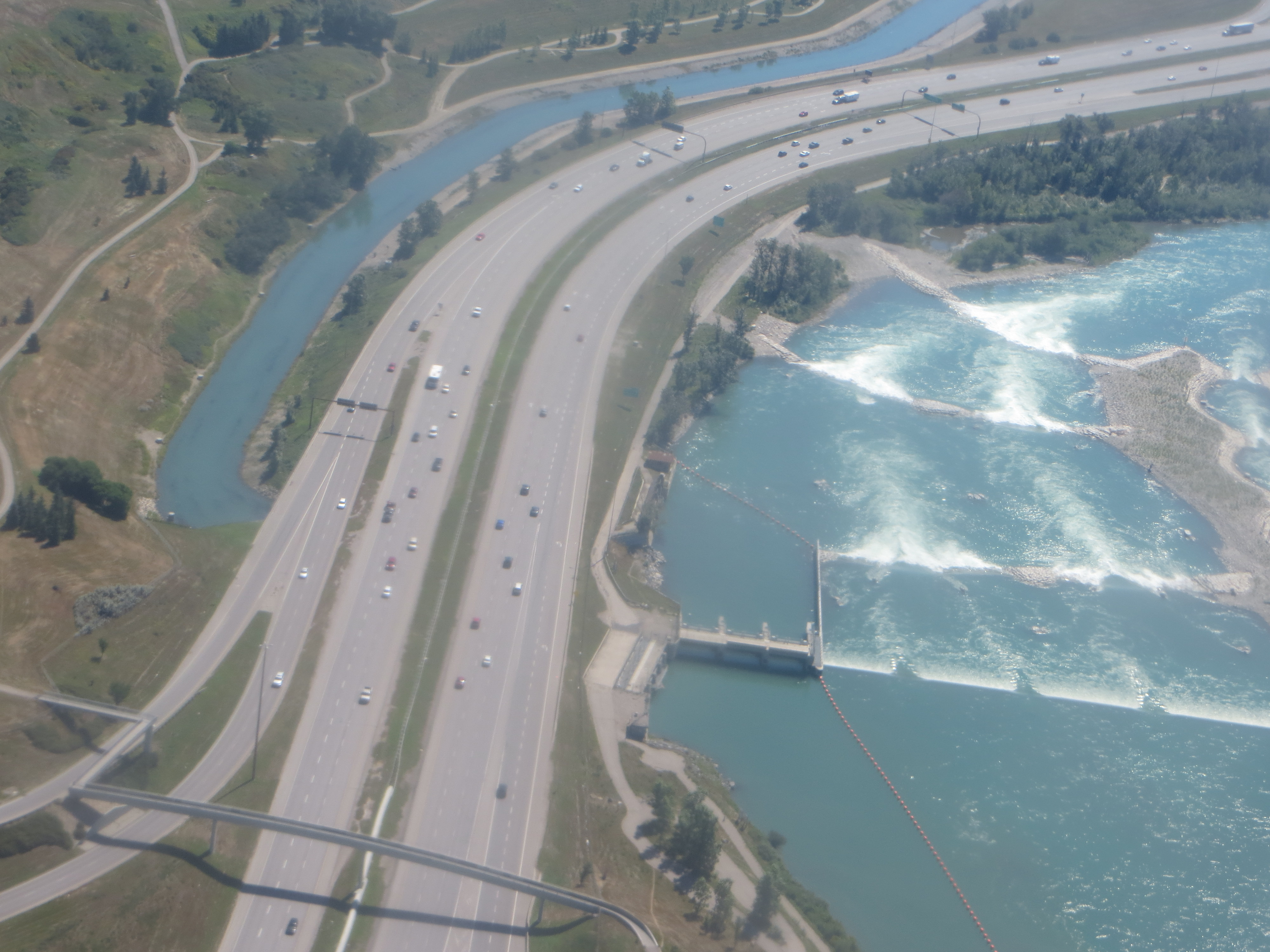
South of Memorial Drive, the main canal of the Western Irrigation District splits from the Bow River and passes underneath Deerfoot Trail, providing water to areas east of Calgary.

In March 2017, construction of a partial cloverleaf interchange was approved in south Calgary at 212 Avenue SE, between the Bow River and 192 Avenue. Calgary paid for the project initially, and will later be repaid by Alberta and Brookfield Residential, who are developing the neighbourhood in the vicinity of the interchange. Prior to a firm commitment for a portion of the funding by Brookfield, Alberta had been reluctant to front the estimated $50 million in funding required for the project, though the city of Calgary had offered to pay for it in the interim as long as the money was paid back by the province. The city had also considered contributing $20 million in tandem with Brookfield, with the province paying for the remaining $30 million. City councillor Shane Keating stated in August 2016 that development of the Seton neighbourhood will be hampered until the 212 Avenue interchange is completed.

A study was completed by Alberta in 2007 to determine the best course of action for upgrades to the incomplete interchange of Glenmore Trail and Deerfoot Trail. The interchange carries 130,000 vehicles per day on Deerfoot Trail and 100,000 vehicles on Glenmore Trail, making it one of the busiest interchanges in western Canada, but there is no direct access for traffic turning from northbound Deerfoot to westbound Glenmore. Stage 1 of the proposed improvements would not remedy this problem, but rather correct a pinch point on Deerfoot Trail by constructing a new three lane bridge to carry the northbound Deerfoot lanes over Glenmore. Deerfoot Trail would then be three lanes each way through the interchange. For the ultimate plan, a large cloverstack interchange is planned with left-turn movements handled by third-level directional flyovers providing free-flowing access to and from Deerfoot Trail. The proposed ultimate configuration would require acquisition of land from adjacent properties for the construction of the flyovers and other modifications to Glenmore Trail.

The planning study also calls for the construction of a new bridge alongside the existing Calf Robe Bridge, as part of a local-express system between Peigan and Glenmore Trails. Glenmore Trail would be widened to as many as 10 lanes between Blackfoot and Deerfoot Trails, along with modifications of the interchange at Blackfoot Trail, and the addition of braided ramps to facilitate the new flyovers.

== Future ==
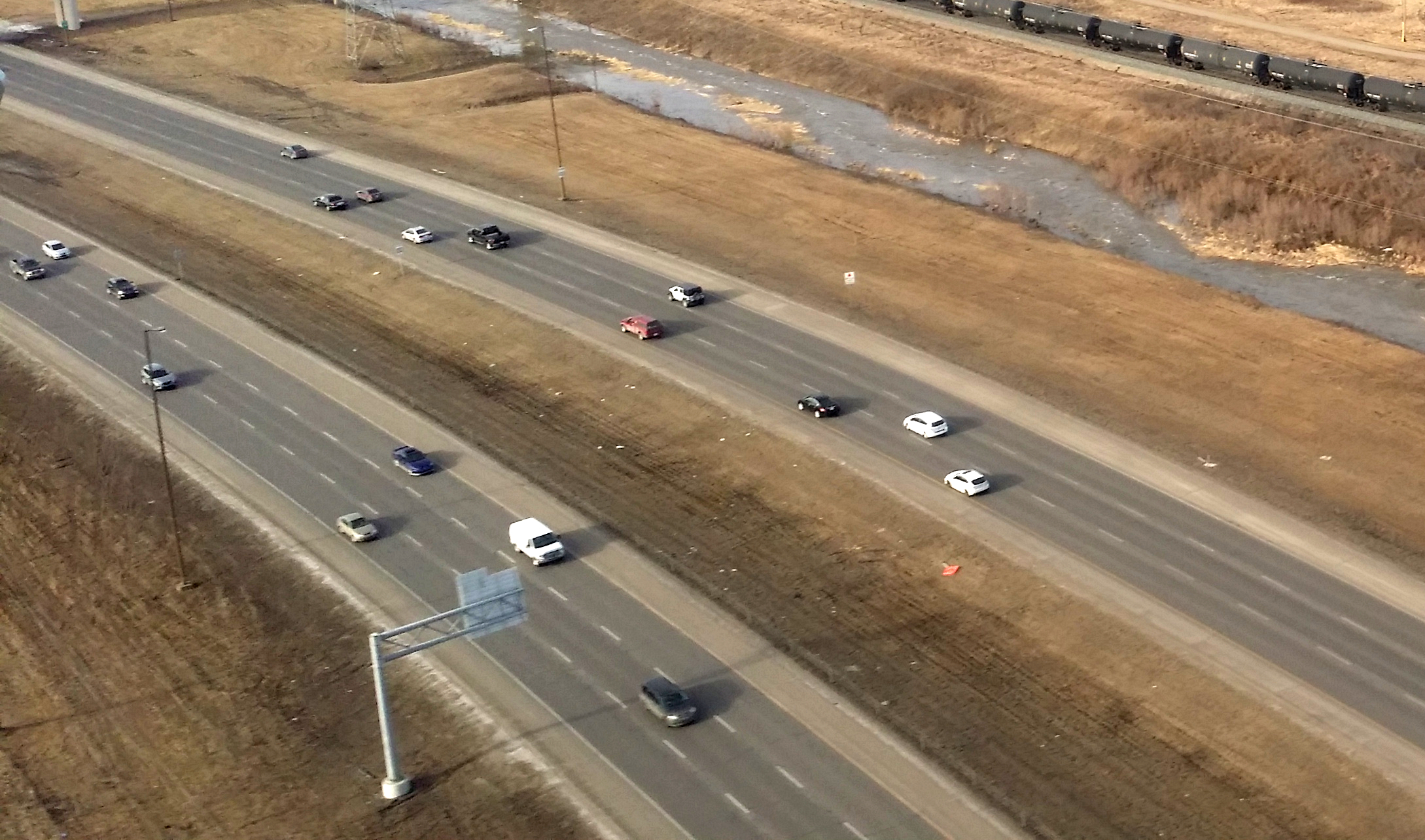
Looking south on Deerfoot Trail where it lies on the east bank of Nose Creek near Calgary International Airport, north of Beddington Trail, prior to its 2024 widening from 6 to 8 lanes

Alberta Transportation and the city of Calgary began a study in 2016 to develop short-term and long-term plans for Deerfoot Trail. Almost the entire length of the freeway was assessed. The study aimed to address Deerfoot's problems overall, as opposed to localized solutions that could simply shift traffic bottlenecks to another section of the freeway. Five short-term options were presented in May 2017; they included a braided ramp in south Calgary between Southland Drive and Anderson Road, a jughandle intersection at 32 Avenue NE and 12 Street NE, left turn restrictions on McKnight Boulveard east of Deerfoot, and a pair of new northbound on-ramps between McKnight Boulevard and Airport Trail. All possibilities for improvement were considered, including high-occupancy vehicle lanes. Despite the initial fixes presented by the study, Alberta Transportation did not include any of the proposed projects on the list of unfunded capital projects. In 2017, the City of Calgary began work to construct a 2-lane bridge for bus rapid transit over Deerfoot Trail south of 17 Avenue SE. As part of Calgary Transit's developing network of bus-only routes, the new bridge does not interchange with Deerfoot Trail and was completed in late 2018.

In March 2019, Brian Mason, the Minister of Transportation, announced plans for $478 million worth of improvements to a 21-kilometre (13 mi) stretch of Deerfoot between Beddington Trail in the north and Anderson Road in the south. The United Conservative Party later that year reduced the government's financial commitment to the project to a total of $210 million. The joint Deerfoot Trail study was completed in early 2021, summarizing the short and long-term improvement options that had been presented throughout the study period. Starting in January 2023, Aecon and several other contractors began a nearly $800 million, four-year improvement project for the freeway. The objectives are to widen most six lane portions of the freeway to eight lanes, and an auxiliary lane in several of the short weave zones, twin the Ivor Strong Bridge and mainline bridges over Glenmore Trail, and various other interchange reconfigurations and modernizations. All work north of Memorial Drive was completed by 2025, with the balance expected to be completed by late 2027.

== Exit list ==
Location	km	mi	Exit	Destinations	Notes
Foothills County	0.0	0.0	—	Highway 2 south / Highway 2A south – Fort Macleod, Lethbridge	Continues south
Foothills County	0.0	0.0	225	Highway 2A north (Macleod Trail) – City Centre	Northbound exit and southbound entrance
Foothills County	2.3	1.4	227	Dunbow Road – Heritage Pointe, De Winton	
Foothills–Calgary boundary	4.6	2.9	Crosses the Bow River		
Calgary	6.3	3.9	230	212 Avenue SE	
Calgary	7.8	4.8	232	Cranston Avenue / Seton Boulevard	To South Health Campus; no access from Stoney Trail
Calgary	8.3– 10.8	5.2– 6.7	234	Stoney Trail (Highway 201)	Signed as exits 234A (east) and 234B (west); Highway 201 exit 101; formerly Highway 22X
Calgary	8.3– 10.8	5.2– 6.7	234B	McKenzie Lake Boulevard / Cranston Boulevard	Southbound exit and northbound entrance
Calgary	11.9	7.4	236	McKenzie Towne Boulevard / McKenzie Lake Boulevard	
Calgary	13.6	8.5	238	130 Avenue SE	
Calgary	15.1	9.4	240	Barlow Trail north	
Calgary	16.8	10.4	241	24 Street SE / Douglasdale Boulevard	
Calgary	18.0	11.2	Ivor Strong Bridge crosses the Bow River		
Calgary	18.4	11.4	243	Anderson Road / Bow Bottom Trail	
Calgary	20.1	12.5	245	Southland Drive	
Calgary	21.2	13.2	246	11 Street SE – Shopping Centre	Southbound exit and entrance
Calgary	21.9	13.6	247	Heritage Drive / Glenmore Trail west – Shopping Centre	Northbound exit and entrance
Calgary	23.1	14.4	248	Glenmore Trail	Southbound signed as exits 248A (east) and 248B (west); no northbound to westbound exit, northbound to westbound accessed from exit 247; formerly Highway 8 west
Calgary	25.4	15.8	Calf Robe Bridge crosses the Bow River		
Calgary	26.7	16.6	251	Peigan Trail east / Barlow Trail south	
Calgary	29.4	18.3	254	17 Avenue SE east / Blackfoot Trail south	Formerly Highway 1A east
Calgary	31.0	19.3	256	Memorial Drive – City Centre	
Calgary	33.2	20.6	258	16 Avenue NE (Highway 1) – Banff, Medicine Hat	
Calgary	35.0	21.7	260	32 Avenue NE	
Calgary	36.7	22.8	261	McKnight Boulevard	Formerly signed as exits 261A (east) and 261B (west)
Calgary	38.4	23.9	263	64 Avenue NE	
Calgary	40.1	24.9	265	Beddington Trail west / 11 Street NE south	Beddington Trail northbound exit and southbound entrance; 11 Street NE northbound exit and entrance completed in October 2024
Calgary	42.0	26.1	266	96 Avenue NE / Airport Trail – Calgary International Airport	
Calgary	43.9	27.3	268	Country Hills Boulevard	
Calgary	44.8– 46.8	27.8– 29.1	271	Stoney Trail (Highway 201)	Highway 201 exit 60
Calgary	44.8– 46.8	27.8– 29.1	—	Highway 2 north (Queen Elizabeth II Highway) – Red Deer, Edmonton	Continues north
1.000 mi = 1.609 km; 1.000 km = 0.621 mi: Incomplete access

== See also ==
- Transportation in Calgary
