= Alberta Highway 567 =

Highway in Alberta, Canada

Highway 567
- Big Hill Springs Road, Veterans Boulevard
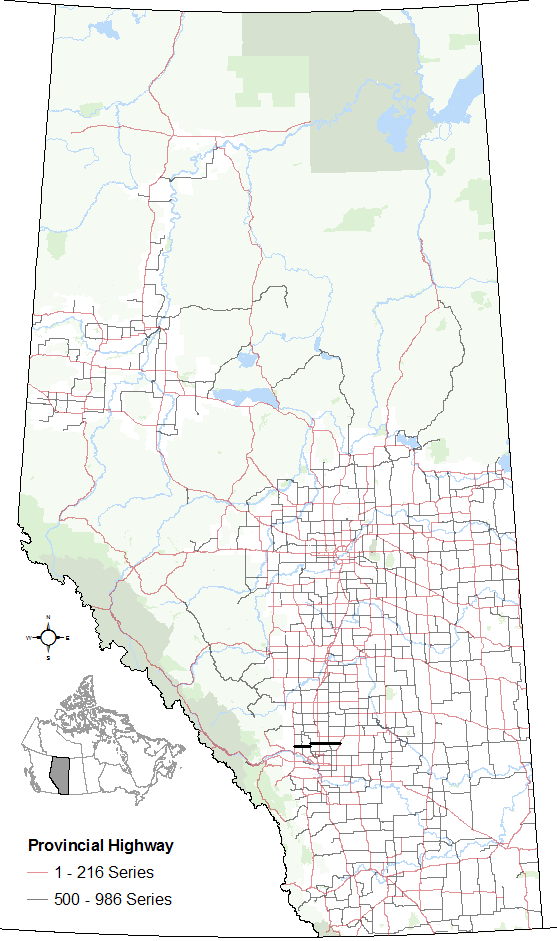

Route information
- Maintained by Alberta Transportation, City of Airdrie
- Length: 64.5 km (40.1 mi)

Major junctions
- West end: Highway 22 north of Cochrane
- Highway 772 north of Calgary; Highway 2 in Airdrie
- East end: Highway 9 near Irricana

Location
- Country: Canada
- Province: Alberta
- Specialized and rural municipalities: Rocky View County
- Major cities: Airdrie

Highway system
- Alberta Provincial Highway Network; List; Former
← Highway 566	→ Highway 569

Alberta Provincial Highway No. 567, commonly referred to as Highway 567, is a highway in the province of Alberta, Canada. It runs west–east through the Calgary Region north of the City of Calgary.

Highway 567 begins at its intersection with Highway 22 (Cowboy Trail), 10 km north of the Town of Cochrane, and travels eastward past Big Hill Springs Provincial Park, to Highway 772 (Symons Valley Road) where it jogs north for 3 km before it continues east through the City of Airdrie and intersects Highway 2. The highway ends at Highway 9, 4 km southeast of the Town of Irricana.

The highway is also known as Big Hill Springs Road between Highway 22 and Highway 772 and Veterans Boulevard within Airdrie. Prior to 2005, the highway was named Airdrie Road west of Highway 2 and Irricana Road east of Highway 2.

== Major intersections ==
Starting at the west end of Highway 567:

Rural/specialized municipality	Location	km	mi	Destinations	Notes
Rocky View County		0.0	0.0	Highway 22 (Cowboy Trail) – Sundre, Cochrane	Roundabout
Rocky View County		6.5	4.0	PAR 116 south – Big Hill Springs Provincial Park	
Rocky View County		9.8	6.1	Highway 766 (Lochend Road)	
Rocky View County		21.3	13.2	Highway 772 south (Symons Valley Road) – Calgary Big Hill Springs Road east	Highway 567 branches north; west end of Highway 766 concurrency
Rocky View County		24.6	15.3	Highway 772 north (Symons Valley Road) – Madden	Highway 567 branches east; east end of Highway 766 concurrency
City of Airdrie		34.4	21.4	8 Street NW	
City of Airdrie		35.2	21.9	Main Street N	To Dickson-Stevenson Trail and Highway 2A
City of Airdrie		36.0	22.4	Highway 2 – Red Deer, Edmonton, Calgary	Interchange; Highway 2 exit 285
Rocky View County		48.2	30.0	Highway 791 north	West end of Highway 791 concurrency
Rocky View County		49.8	30.9	Highway 791 south – Chestermere	East end of Highway 791 concurrency
Rocky View County	Irricana	62.9	39.1	Range Road 264	
Rocky View County	Irricana	64.5	40.1	Highway 9 – Beiseker, Drumheller, Calgary	
1.000 mi = 1.609 km; 1.000 km = 0.621 mi: Concurrency terminus
