= Alberta Highway 566 =

Highway in Alberta, Canada

Highway 566
- 176 Avenue N, Township Road 262
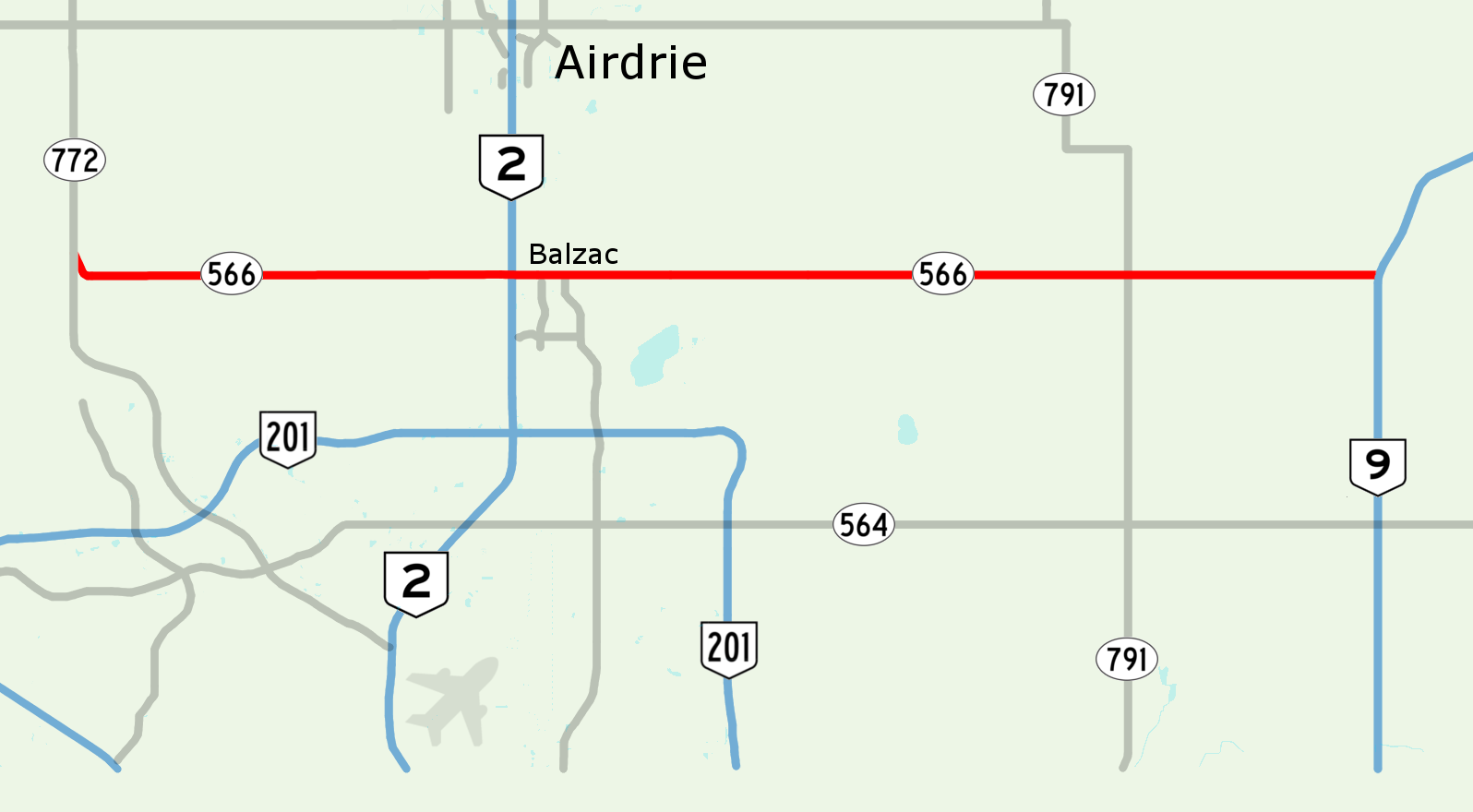

Route information
- Maintained by Alberta Transportation
- Length: 34.33 km (21.33 mi)

Major junctions
- West end: Highway 772 north of Calgary
- Highway 2 near Balzac
- East end: Highway 9 between Kathyrn and Keoma

Location
- Country: Canada
- Province: Alberta
- Specialized and rural municipalities: Rocky View County
- Major cities: Calgary

Highway system
- Alberta Numbered Highway Network; List; Former
← Highway 564	→ Highway 567

Alberta Provincial Highway No. 566 in the Canadian province of Alberta lies approximately halfway between Calgary and Airdrie, running west to east from Highway 772 (Symons Valley Road) to Highway 9 near the hamlets of Kathyrn and Keoma.

North of Calgary, from between Range Road 15 & 20 (Panorama Road (24 Street NW) & Mountain View Road) to Range Road 10A (20 Street NE), it is given the designation 176 Avenue N, however it does not enter city limits, with the boundary on the south side of the right of way.

Alberta Transportation has plans to upgrade Highway 566 to a divided expressway.

== Major intersections ==
Starting from the west end of Highway 566.

Rural/specialized municipality	Location	km	mi	Destinations	Notes
Rocky View County		0.0	0.0	Highway 772 (Symons Valley Road) – Madden, Calgary	Western terminus; to Shaganappi Trail
Rocky View County–Calgary boundary		6.9	4.3	Range Road 13 north / Centre Street south	Former Highway 782 south
Rocky View County–Calgary boundary		10.1	6.3	Range Road 15 north / 15 Street NE south – Airdrie	
Rocky View County	Balzac	11.7	7.3	Highway 2 – Red Deer, Calgary	Fifth Meridian, 114° Longitude; interchange; Highway 2 exit 275; to Deerfoot Trail
Rocky View County	Balzac	12.5	7.8	CrossIron Mills Boulevard	To CrossIron Mills Shopping Centre
Rocky View County	Balzac	13.1	8.1	Range Road 293 north / Dwight McLellan Trail south – Calgary	To Métis Trail
Rocky View County		27.7	17.2	Highway 791 – Delacour, Chestermere	
Rocky View County	Kathyrn	32.6	20.3	Range Road 273	
Rocky View County		34.2	21.3	Highway 9 – Beiseker, Irricana, Calgary	Eastern terminus
Rocky View County	Keoma	36.2	22.5	1st Avenue / Township Road 262	Township Road 262 continues east
1.000 mi = 1.609 km; 1.000 km = 0.621 mi: Closed/former

== See also ==
- Transportation in Calgary
