= 2018 Alberta municipal censuses =

- April 1 – June 30, 2018
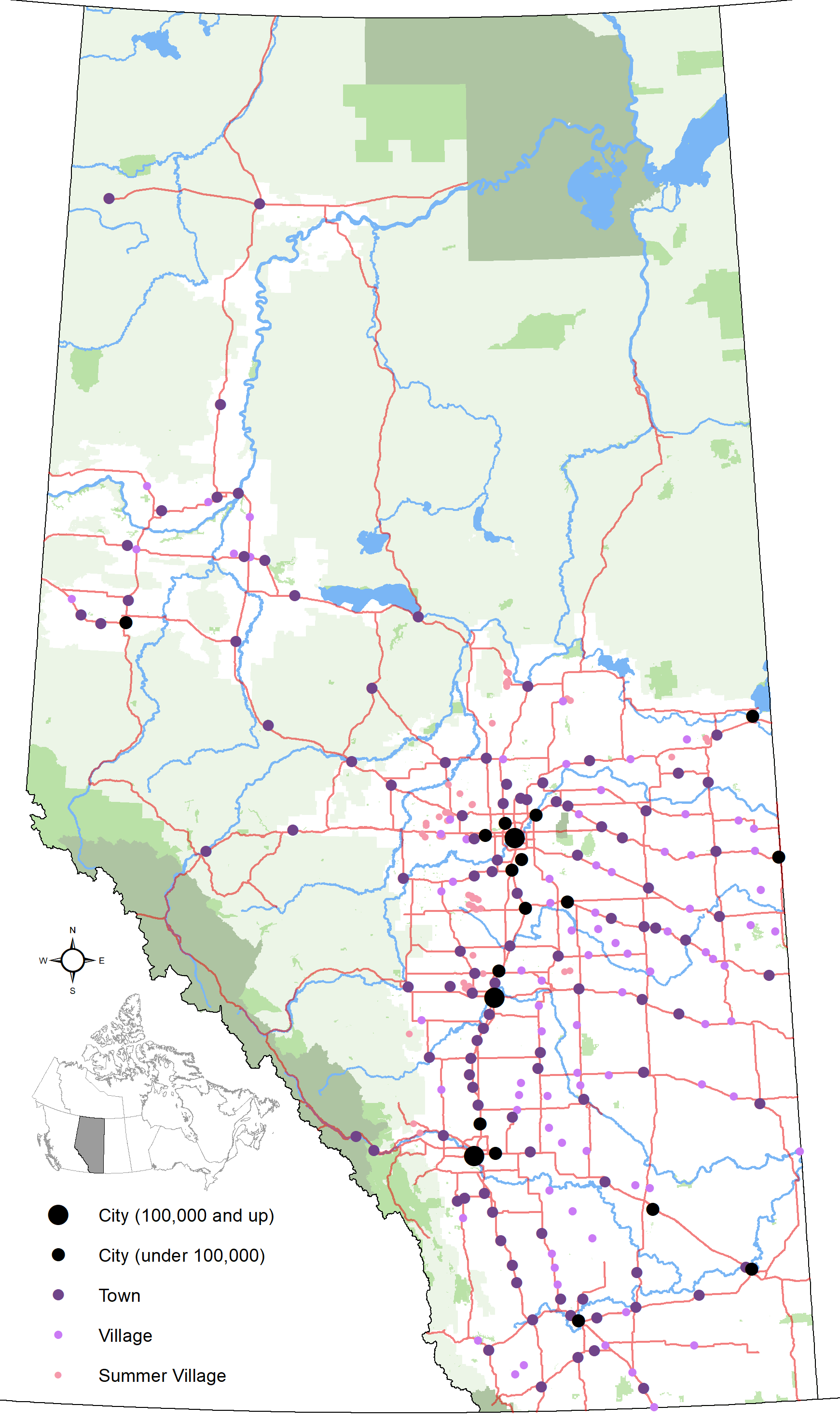
- Distribution of Alberta's 269 urban municipalities

Alberta has provincial legislation allowing its municipalities to conduct municipal censuses between April 1 and June 30 inclusive. Municipalities choose to conduct their own censuses for multiple reasons such as to better inform municipal service planning and provision, to capitalize on per capita based grant funding from higher levels of government, or to simply update their populations since the last federal census.

Alberta began the year of 2018 with 352 municipalities. Of these, at least 38 (10.8%) conducted a municipal census in 2018. Alberta Municipal Affairs recognized those conducted by 37 of these municipalities. By municipal status, it recognized those conducted by 9 of Alberta's 18 cities, 11 of 109 towns, 4 of 86 villages, 3 of its 6 specialized municipalities, 1 of 63 municipal districts, 1 of its 8 improvement districts, and all 8 Metis settlements. (Note: No censuses were conducted among Alberta's 3 special areas and 51 summer villages.)

Some municipalities achieved population milestones as a result of their 2018 censuses. Blackfalds exceeded 10,000 residents, making it eligible for city status, while the Municipal District of Greenview No. 16 grew beyond the 6,000 mark for the first time.

== Municipal census results ==
The following summarizes the results of the numerous municipal censuses conducted in 2018.

| 2018 municipal census summary | | | | 2016 federal census comparison | | | | Previous municipal census comparison | | | |
| Municipality | Status | Census date | 2018 pop. | 2016 pop. | Absolute growth | Absolute change | Annual growth rate | Prev. pop. | Prev. census year | Absolute growth | Annual growth rate |
|---|---|---|---|---|---|---|---|---|---|---|---|
| Airdrie | City | April 1, 2018 | 68,091 | 61,581 | 6,510 | 10.6% | 5.2% | 64,922 | 2017 | 3,169 | 4.9% |
| Beaumont | Town | May 1, 2018 | 18,829 | 17,396 | 1,433 | 8.2% | 4.0% | 18,320 | 2017 | 509 | 2.8% |
| Blackfalds | Town | May 15, 2018 | 10,125 | 9,328 | 797 | 8.5% | 4.2% | 9,916 | 2017 | 209 | 2.1% |
| Boyle | Village | June 4, 2018 | 925 | 845 | 80 | 9.5% | 4.6% | 918 | 2009 | 7 | 0.1% |
| Bruderheim | Town | April 1, 2018 | 1,395 | 1,308 | 87 | 6.7% | 3.3% | 1,348 | 2014 | 47 | 0.9% |
| Buffalo Lake | Metis settlement | June 5, 2018 | 702 | 712 | −10 | −1.4% | −0.7% | 676 | 2015 | 26 | 1.3% |
| Calgary | City | April 1, 2018 | 1,267,344 | 1,239,220 | 28,124 | 2.3% | 1.1% | 1,246,337 | 2017 | 21,007 | 1.7% |
| Cardston | Town | June 18, 2018 | 3,909 | 3,585 | 324 | 9% | 4.4% | 3,578 | 2007 | 331 | 0.8% |
| Chestermere | City | May 1, 2018 | 20,732 | 19,887 | 845 | 4.2% | 2.1% | 20,331 | 2017 | 401 | 2.0% |
| Coalhurst | Town | May 22, 2018 | 2,767 | 2,668 | 99 | 3.7% | 1.8% | 2,522 | 2015 | 245 | 3.1% |
| Cochrane | Town | April 3, 2018 | 27,960 | 25,853 | 2,107 | 8.1% | 4.0% | 26,320 | 2017 | 1,640 | 6.2% |
| Crossfield | Town | May 1, 2018 | 3,308 | 2,983 | 325 | 10.9% | 5.3% | 3,055 | 2017 | 253 | 8.3% |
| East Prairie | Metis settlement | June 5, 2018 | 491 | 304 | 187 | 61.5% | 27.1% | 459 | 2015 | 32 | 2.3% |
| Eckville | Town | May 24, 2018 | 1,163 | 1,125 | 38 | 3.4% | 1.7% | 1,002 | 2007 | 161 | 1.4% |
| Elizabeth | Metis settlement | June 5, 2018 | 639 | 653 | −14 | −2.1% | −1.1% | 690 | 2015 | −51 | −2.5% |
| Empress | Village | June 1, 2018 | 155 | 135 | 20 | 14.8% | 7.2% | 160 | 2017 | −5 | −3.1% |
| Fishing Lake | Metis settlement | June 5, 2018 | 436 | 446 | −10 | −2.2% | −1.1% | 491 | 2015 | −55 | −3.9% |
| Fort Saskatchewan | City | April 2, 2018 | 26,328 | 24,149 | 2,179 | 9% | 4.4% | 25,533 | 2017 | 795 | 3.1% |
| Gift Lake | Metis settlement | June 5, 2018 | 812 | 658 | 154 | 23.4% | 11.1% | 651 | 2015 | 161 | 7.6% |
| Grande Prairie | City | April 16, 2018 | 69,088 | 63,166 | 5,922 | 9.4% | 4.6% | 68,556 | 2015 | 5,922 | 0.3% |
| MD of Greenview No. 16 | Municipal district | April 30, 2018 | 6,044 | 5,583 | 461 | 8.3% | 4.0% | 5,242 | 2013 | 802 | 2.9% |
| Improvement District No. 4 (Waterton) | Improvement district | June 22, 2018 | 108 | 105 | 3 | 2.9% | 1.4% | | | | |
| Kikino | Metis settlement | June 5, 2018 | 928 | 934 | −6 | −0.6% | −0.3% | 918 | 2015 | 10 | 0.4% |
| Leduc | City | April 1, 2018 | 32,448 | 29,993 | 2,455 | 8.2% | 4.0% | 31,130 | 2017 | 1,318 | 4.2% |
| Lethbridge | City | April 1, 2018 | 99,769 | 92,729 | 7,040 | 7.6% | 3.7% | 98,198 | 2017 | 1,571 | 1.6% |
| Mackenzie County | Specialized municipality | April 18, 2018 | 12,512 | 11,171 | 1,341 | 12% | 5.8% | 11,750 | 2015 | 762 | 2.1% |
| Okotoks | Town | May 2, 2018 | 29,002 | 28,881 | 121 | 0.4% | 0.2% | 28,016 | 2015 | 986 | 1.2% |
| Paddle Prairie | Metis settlement | June 5, 2018 | 536 | 544 | −8 | −1.5% | −2.3% | 530 | 2015 | 6 | 0.4% |
| Peavine | Metis settlement | June 5, 2018 | 566 | 607 | −41 | −6.8% | −3.4% | 639 | 2015 | −73 | −4.0% |
| Raymond | Town | May 1, 2018 | 4,252 | 3,708 | 544 | 14.7% | 7.1% | 4,037 | 2017 | 215 | 5.3% |
| Rocky View County | Municipal district | | 36,776 (Note: Rocky View County was unable to enumerate 1,455 or 9.8% of its 14,791 dwellings in its 2018 municipal census. Rocky View extrapolated its results to an estimated population of 40,705.) | 39,407 | −2,631 | −6.7% | −3.4% | 38,055 | 2013 | −1,279 | −0.7% |
| Spruce Grove | City | April 4, 2018 | 35,766 | 34,066 | 1,700 | 5% | 2.5% | 34,881 | 2017 | 885 | 2.5% |
| St. Albert | City | May 1, 2018 | 66,082 | 65,589 | 493 | 0.8% | 0.4% | 64,645 | 2016 | 1,437 | 1.1% |
| Stirling | Village | June 1, 2018 | 1,269 | 978 | 291 | 29.8% | 13.9% | 1,269 | 2017 | 0 | 0.0% |
| Strathcona County | Specialized municipality | May 1, 2018 | 98,381 | 98,044 | 337 | 0.3% | 0.2% | 95,597 | 2015 | 2,784 | 1.0% |
| Strathmore | Town | April 1, 2018 | 13,528 | 13,756 | −228 | −1.7% | −0.8% | 13,327 | 2015 | 201 | 0.5% |
| Waskatenau | Village | April 30, 2018 | 227 | 186 | 41 | 22% | 10.5% | 260 | 2000 | −33 | −0.8% |
| RM of Wood Buffalo | Specialized municipality | April 1, 2018 | 75,009 | 71,589 | 3,420 | 4.8% | 2.4% | 81,948 | 2015 | −6,939 | −2.9% |

== Breakdowns ==
=== Urban and rural service areas ===
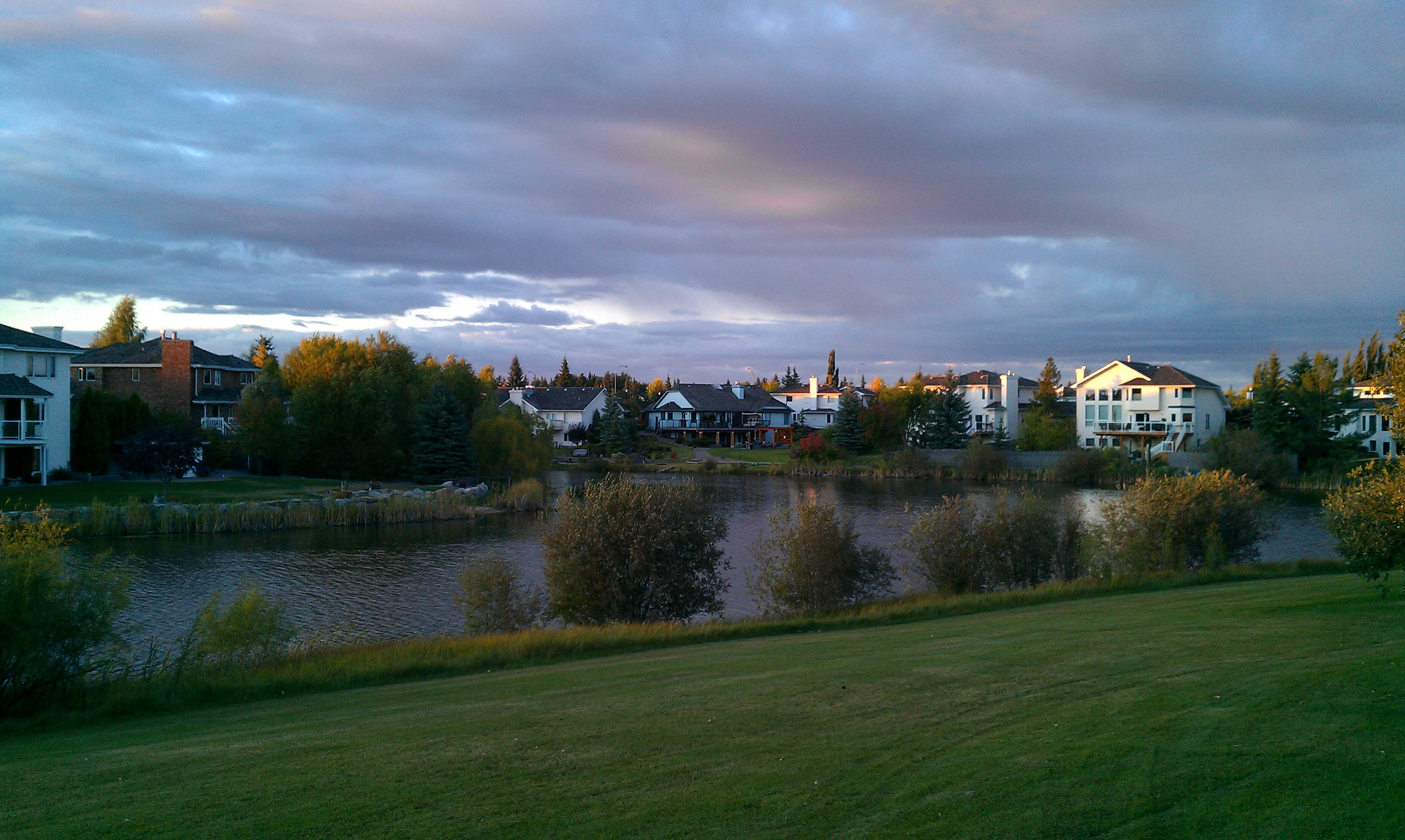
Sherwood Park is an urban service area within Strathcona County.

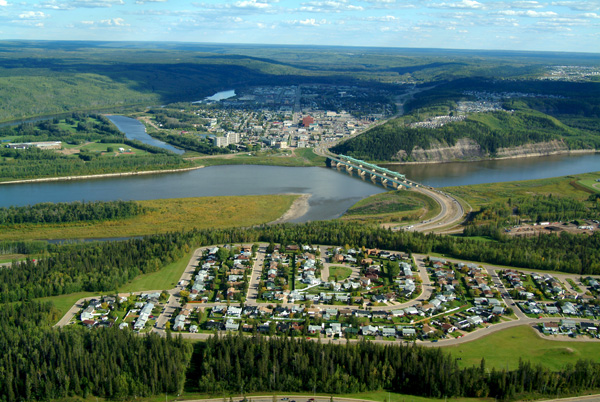
Fort McMurray is the Regional Municipality of Wood Buffalo's urban service area.

==== Strathcona County ====
| 2018 municipal census summary | | 2015 municipal census comparison | | |
| Area | 2018 population | Previous population | Absolute growth | Annual growth rate |
|---|---|---|---|---|
| Sherwood Park urban service area (Note: The Fort McMurray and Sherwood Park urban service areas are deemed equivalents of cities.) | 71,332 | 68,782 | 2,550 | 1.2% |
| Rural service area (Note: Strathcona County's and the RM of Wood Buffalo's rural service areas are deemed equivalents of municipal districts.) | 27,049 | 26,815 | 234 | 0.3% |
| Total Strathcona County | 98,381 | 95,597 | 2,784 | 1.0% |

==== Wood Buffalo ====
| 2018 municipal census summary | | 2015 municipal census comparison | | |
| Area | 2018 population | Previous population | Absolute growth | Annual growth rate |
|---|---|---|---|---|
| Fort McMurray urban service area | 72,056 | 78,382 | −6,326 | −2.8% |
| Rural service area | 2,953 | 3,566 | −613 | −6.1% |
| Total RM of Wood Buffalo | 75,009 | 81,948 | −6,939 | −2.9% |

=== Hamlets ===
The following is a list of hamlet and other unincorporated community populations determined by the 2018 municipal censuses conducted by Rocky View County, Strathcona County and the Regional Municipality (RM) of Wood Buffalo excluding the urban service areas of Fort McMurray and Sherwood Park that are presented above.

| 2018 municipal census summary | | | Previous census comparison | | | |
| Hamlet/unincorporated community | Municipality | 2018 population | Previous population | Previous census year | Absolute growth | Annual growth rate |
|---|---|---|---|---|---|---|
| Antler Lake | Strathcona County | 435 | 469 | 2015 | −34 | −2.5% |
| Anzac | RM of Wood Buffalo | 659 | 763 | 2015 | −104 | −4.8% |
| Ardrossan | Strathcona County | 532 | 412 | 2015 | 120 | 8.9% |
| Bottrel | Rocky View County | 5 | | | | |
| Bragg Creek | Rocky View County | 459 | 454 | 2013 | 5 | 0.2% |
| Cochrane Lake | Rocky View County | 769 | 792 | 2013 | −23 | −0.6% |
| Collingwood Cove | Strathcona County | 376 | 360 | 2015 | 16 | 1.5% |
| Conklin | RM of Wood Buffalo | 229 | 376 | 2015 | −147 | −15.2% |
| Conrich | Rocky View County | 21 | 26 | 2013 | −5 | −4.2% |
| Dalemead | Rocky View County | 29 | 27 | 2013 | 2 | 1.4% |
| Dalroy | Rocky View County | 46 | 50 | 2013 | −4 | −1.7% |
| Delacour | Rocky View County | 10 | | | | |
| Fort Chipewyan | RM of Wood Buffalo | 918 | 1,014 | 2015 | −96 | −3.3% |
| Fort MacKay | RM of Wood Buffalo | 59 | 51 | 2015 | 8 | 5.0% |
| Gregoire Lake Estates | RM of Wood Buffalo | 204 | 232 | 2015 | −28 | −4.2% |
| Half Moon Lake | Strathcona County | 214 | 195 | 2015 | 19 | 3.1% |
| Harmony | Rocky View County | 249 | | | | |
| Hastings Lake | Strathcona County | 104 | 87 | 2015 | 17 | 6.1% |
| Indus | Rocky View County | 32 | 36 | 2013 | −4 | −2.3% |
| Janvier | RM of Wood Buffalo | 141 | 155 | 2015 | −14 | −2.3% |
| Josephburg | Strathcona County | 118 | 117 | 2015 | 1 | 0.3% |
| Kathyrn | Rocky View County | 13 | 20 | 2013 | −7 | −8.3% |
| Keoma | Rocky View County | 89 | 85 | 2013 | 4 | 0.9% |
| Langdon | Rocky View County | 5,364 | 4,897 | 2013 | 467 | 1.8% |
| Madden | Rocky View County | 26 | 21 | 2013 | 5 | 4.4% |
| North Cooking Lake | Strathcona County | 57 | 59 | 2015 | −2 | −1.1% |
| Saprae Creek | RM of Wood Buffalo | 715 | 977 | 2015 | −262 | −9.9% |
| South Cooking Lake | Strathcona County | 270 | 302 | 2015 | −32 | −3.7% |

== Shadow population counts ==
Alberta Municipal Affairs defines shadow population as "temporary residents of a municipality who are employed by an industrial or commercial establishment in the municipality for a minimum of 30 days within a municipal census year." Improvement District No. 4 (Wateron) and the RM of Wood Buffalo conducted shadow population counts in 2018. The following presents the results of these counts for comparison with their concurrent municipal census results.

| Municipality | Status | Municipal census population | Shadow population | Combined population |
|---|---|---|---|---|
| Improvement District No. 4 (Wateron) | Improvement district | 108 | 405 | 513 |
| RM of Wood Buffalo | Specialized municipality | 75,009 | 36,678 | 111,687 |

== See also ==
- List of communities in Alberta
