= Alberta Highway 772 =

Highway in Alberta, Canada

Symons Valley Road
- Beddington Trail; Highway 772
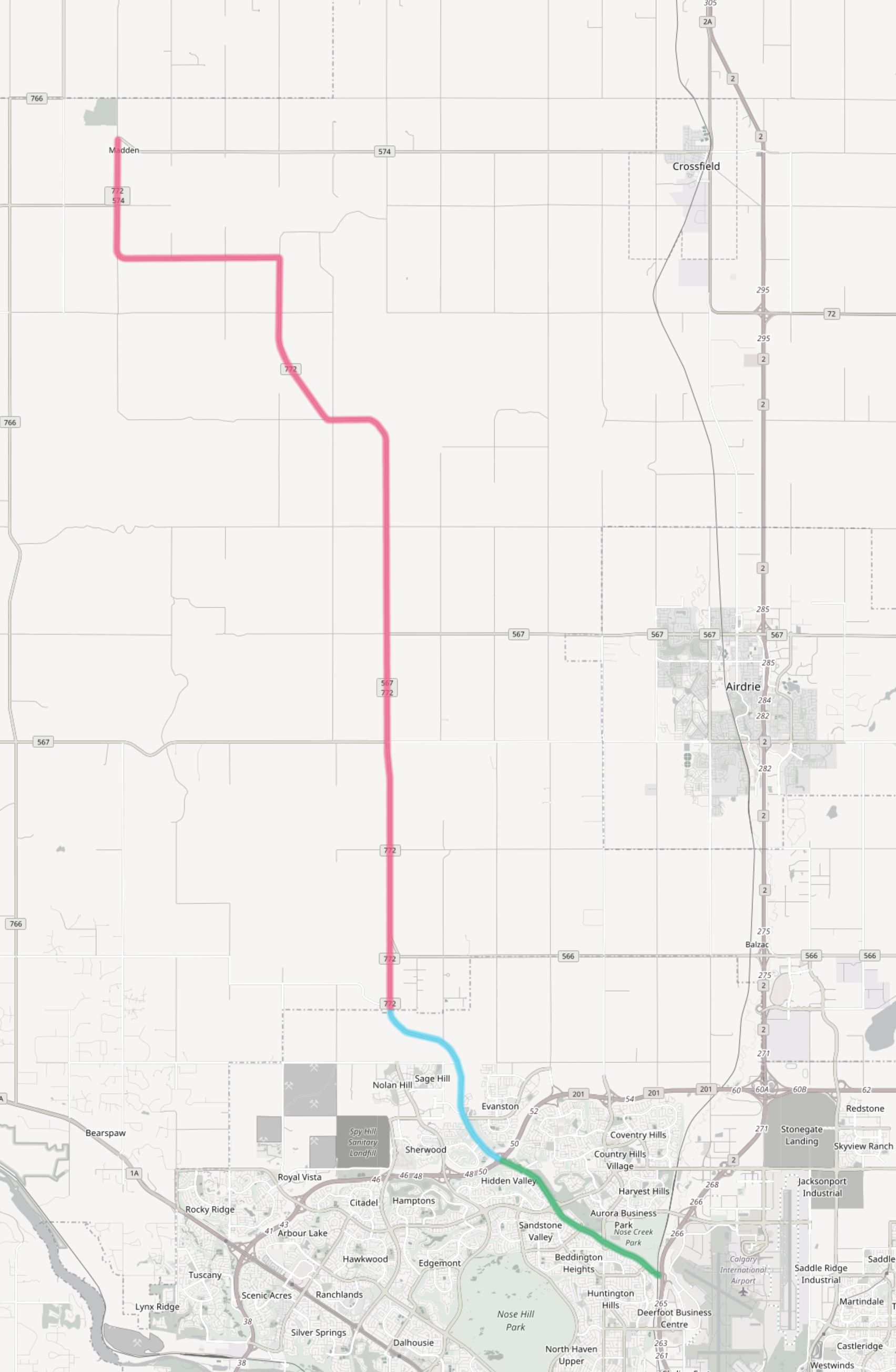
- Beddington Trail (green), Calgary portion of Symons Valley Road (blue) and Rocky View County portion of Symons Valley Road (red)

Route information
- Maintained by the City of Calgary and Alberta Transportation

Beddington Trail
- Length: 6.1 km (3.8 mi)
- South end: Deerfoot Trail (Highway 2)
- North end: Stoney Trail (Highway 201)

Symons Valley Road
- Length: 39.3 km (24.4 mi)
- South end: Stoney Trail (Highway 201)
- North end: Highway 574 east at Madden

Highway 772
- Length: 31.1 km (19.3 mi)
- South end: Calgary city limits
- North end: Highway 574 east at Madden

Location
- Country: Canada
- Province: Alberta
- Specialized and rural municipalities: Rocky View County
- Major cities: Calgary

Highway system
- Alberta Provincial Highway Network; List; Former
← Highway 771	→ Highway 774

Symons Valley Road is a major arterial road and rural highway that links Calgary from Stoney Trail (Highway 201) to Madden in Alberta, Canada. It is preceded by Beddington Trail, a major expressway along West Nose Creek linking Deerfoot Trail to Stoney Trail within Calgary, and is succeeded by Range Road 30. The portion of Symons Valley Road within Rocky View County from the Calgary city limit to Highway 574 south of Madden is designated as Alberta Provincial Highway No. 772.

== Route description ==
Beddington Trail, which precedes Symons Valley Road, travels in a northwest direction from Deerfoot Trail forming the boundary between the communities of Beddington Heights and Sandstone Valley to the southwest and Aurora Business Park and Country Hills to the northeast. Prior to intersecting with Stoney Trail and continuing as Symons Valley Road, Beddington Trail bisects the community of Hidden Valley.

Within Calgary, Symons Valley Road from Stoney Trail to the city limit, just south of Township Road 261, forms the boundary between the communities of Kincora and Evanston before bisecting the community of Sage Hill. Upon leaving the City of Calgary, the roadway is designated as Highway 772 to its intersection with Highway 574, 1.8 km (1.1 mi) south of Madden. After this intersection, Highway 772 becomes Highway 574 for 2.0 km (1.2 mi) to the north end of Madden, at which point Highway 574 turns east towards Crossfield. In addition to being a numbered highway, Rocky View County has named the entirety of Highway 772, as well as the following 2.0 km (1.2 mi) of Highway 574, as Symons Valley Road. Symons Valley Road is signed as Highway 772 from 144 Avenue, but does not officially start until just south of Township Road 261.

== Major intersections ==
Rural/specialized municipality	Location	km	mi	Destinations	Notes
City of Calgary		−12.5	−7.8	Deerfoot Trail (Highway 2)	Beddington Trail southern terminus; Highway 2 exit 265; northbound exit and southbound entrance; entrance only from 11 Street NE
City of Calgary		−11.9	−7.4	Beddington Boulevard (to Centre Street)	
City of Calgary		−10.4	−6.5	Harvest Hills Boulevard	Trumpet interchange; no access to Centre Street
City of Calgary		−11.9	−7.4	Berkshire Boulevard (to Centre Street) / Country Hills Link	
City of Calgary		−8.6	−5.3	Country Hills Boulevard	Partial cloverleaf interchange
City of Calgary		−6.2	−3.9	Stoney Trail (Highway 201)	Partial cloverleaf interchange; Highway 201 exit 50
City of Calgary		−6.2	−3.9	Beddington Trail northern terminus • Symons Valley Road southern terminus	
City of Calgary		−4.5	−2.8	Symons Valley Parkway	
City of Calgary		−2.7	−1.7	114 Avenue NW	
City of Calgary		0.0	0.0	Shaganappi Trail	Calgary city limits; Highway 772 southern terminus
Rocky View County		2.3	1.4	Highway 566 east – Balzac	
Rocky View County		8.2	5.1	Highway 567 west / Big Hill Springs Road – Cochrane, Airdrie (Yankee Valley Boulevard)	Southern end of Highway 567 concurrency
Rocky View County		11.4	7.1	Highway 567 east – Airdrie (Veterans Boulevard)	Northern end of Highway 567 concurrency
Rocky View County		31.1	19.3	Highway 574 west – Bottrel	Southern end of Highway 574 concurrency
Rocky View County	Madden	33.1	20.6	Highway 574 east – Crossfield	Highway 772 / Symons Valley Road northern terminus; continues as Range Road 30
1.000 mi = 1.609 km; 1.000 km = 0.621 mi: Concurrency terminus; Incomplete access; Route transition

== See also ==
- Transportation in Calgary
