= Improvement District No. 4 =

Improvement district in Alberta, Canada

Improvement District No. 4 Improvement District No. 04 (Waterton)
- Improvement district
- Location within Alberta
- Coordinates: 49°5′N 113°54′W
- Country: Canada
- Province: Alberta
- Region: Southern Alberta
- Census division: No. 3
- Established: January 1, 1944
- Renumbered: January 1, 1945; January 1, 1969

Government
  - Governing body: Improvement District No. 4 Council
  - Chair: Ken Black
  - CAO: Scott Barton
  - MLA: Chelsae Petrovic

Area (2021)
  - Land: 482.54 km^{2} (186.31 sq mi)

Population (2021)
  - Total: 132
- Time zone: UTC−06:00 (Alberta Time)
- Website: Official website

Improvement District No. 4, or Improvement District No. 04 (Waterton), is an improvement district in Alberta, Canada. Coextensive with Waterton Lakes National Park in southern Alberta, the improvement district provides local governance for lands within the park that are not within an Indian reserve.

== History ==
Prior to 1944, those lands within Improvement District (ID) No. 4 were split between the Municipal District of Kerr No. 39 and the Municipal District of Castle River No. 40. Following a partial amalgamation of the two municipal districts, remnant unsurveyed lands were incorporated as ID No. 11 on January 1, 1944. It was renumbered to ID No. 8 on April 1, 1945 and again to ID No. 4 on January 1, 1969.

== Geography ==
=== Communities and localities ===
There are no urban municipalities or hamlets within Improvement District No. 4. Blood 148A, a First Nation reserve of the Kainai Nation, is also within Improvement District No. 4.

The following localities are within Improvement District No. 4.

Localities

- Chief Mountain
- Waterton Lakes National Park
- Waterton Park

== Demographics ==
In the 2021 Census of Population conducted by Statistics Canada, Improvement District No. 4 had a population of 132 living in 54 of its 195 total private dwellings, a change of 25.7% from its 2016 population of 105. With a land area of 482.54 km^{2} (186.31 sq mi), it had a population density of 0.3/km^{2} (0.7/sq mi) in 2021.

The population of Improvement District No. 24 according to its 2018 municipal census is 108. The municipal census also counted a shadow population – temporary residents employed in the municipality – of 405 for a combined population of 513.

In the 2016 Census of Population conducted by Statistics Canada, Improvement District No. 4 had a population of 105 living in 39 of its 168 total private dwellings, a change of 19.3% from its 2011 population of 88. With a land area of 485.66 km^{2} (187.51 sq mi), it had a population density of 0.2/km^{2} (0.6/sq mi) in 2016.

== Government ==
Improvement District No. 4 is governed by a five-person council comprising a chair and four councillors. Ken Black is the chair of the council.

== See also ==
- List of communities in Alberta
