= Dalroy =

- Hamlet
- Location of Dalroy Dalroy (Canada)
- Coordinates: 51.129°N 113.667°W
- Country: Canada
- Province: Alberta
- Region: Calgary Metropolitan Region
- Census division: 6
- Municipal district: Rocky View County

Government
  - Type: Unincorporated
  - Governing body: Rocky View County Council

Area (2021)
  - Land: 0.17 km^{2} (0.066 sq mi)

Population (2021)
  - Total: 39
  - Density: 226.5/km^{2} (587/sq mi)
- Time zone: UTC−06:00 (Alberta Time)
- Area codes: 403, 587, 825

Dalroy is a hamlet in southern Alberta under the jurisdiction of Rocky View County. It is located approximately 28 km (18 mi) east of Downtown Calgary and 0.8 km (0.5 mi) east of Highway 9.

This name 'Dalroy' is a combination of the names Dill & McElroy who were Dalroy's first local merchants.

== Demographics ==
In the 2021 Census of Population conducted by Statistics Canada, Dalroy had a population of 39 living in 17 of its 19 total private dwellings, a change of −22% from its 2016 population of 50. With a land area of 0.17 km^{2} (0.066 sq mi), it had a population density of 229.4/km^{2} (594.2/sq mi) in 2021.

The population of Dalroy according to the 2018 municipal census conducted by Rocky View County is 46.

As a designated place in the 2016 Census of Population conducted by Statistics Canada, Dalroy had a population of 55 living in 23 of its 23 total private dwellings, a change of 3.8% from its 2011 population of 53. With a land area of 0.32 km^{2} (0.12 sq mi), it had a population density of 171.9/km^{2} (445.2/sq mi) in 2016.

== See also ==
- List of communities in Alberta
- List of hamlets in Alberta
