= Centre Street (Calgary) =

Major street in Calgary, Alberta

Route information
- Length: 20.7 km (12.9 mi): Southern section: 0.8 km (0.5 mi); Volunteer Way section: 0.7 km (0.4 mi); Main section: 10.1 km (6.3 mi); Northern section: 9.1 km (5.7 mi)

Southern section
- South end: Glenmore Trail / Fairmount Drive
- North end: 58 Avenue S

Volunteer Way section
- South end: 18 Avenue S
- North end: 10 Avenue S

Main section
- South end: 9 Avenue S
- Major intersections: Highway 1
- North end: Beddington Trail

Northern section
- South end: Beddington Trail
- Major intersections: Highway 201
- North end: Highway 566

Location
- Country: Canada
- Province: Alberta

Highway system
- Roads in Calgary

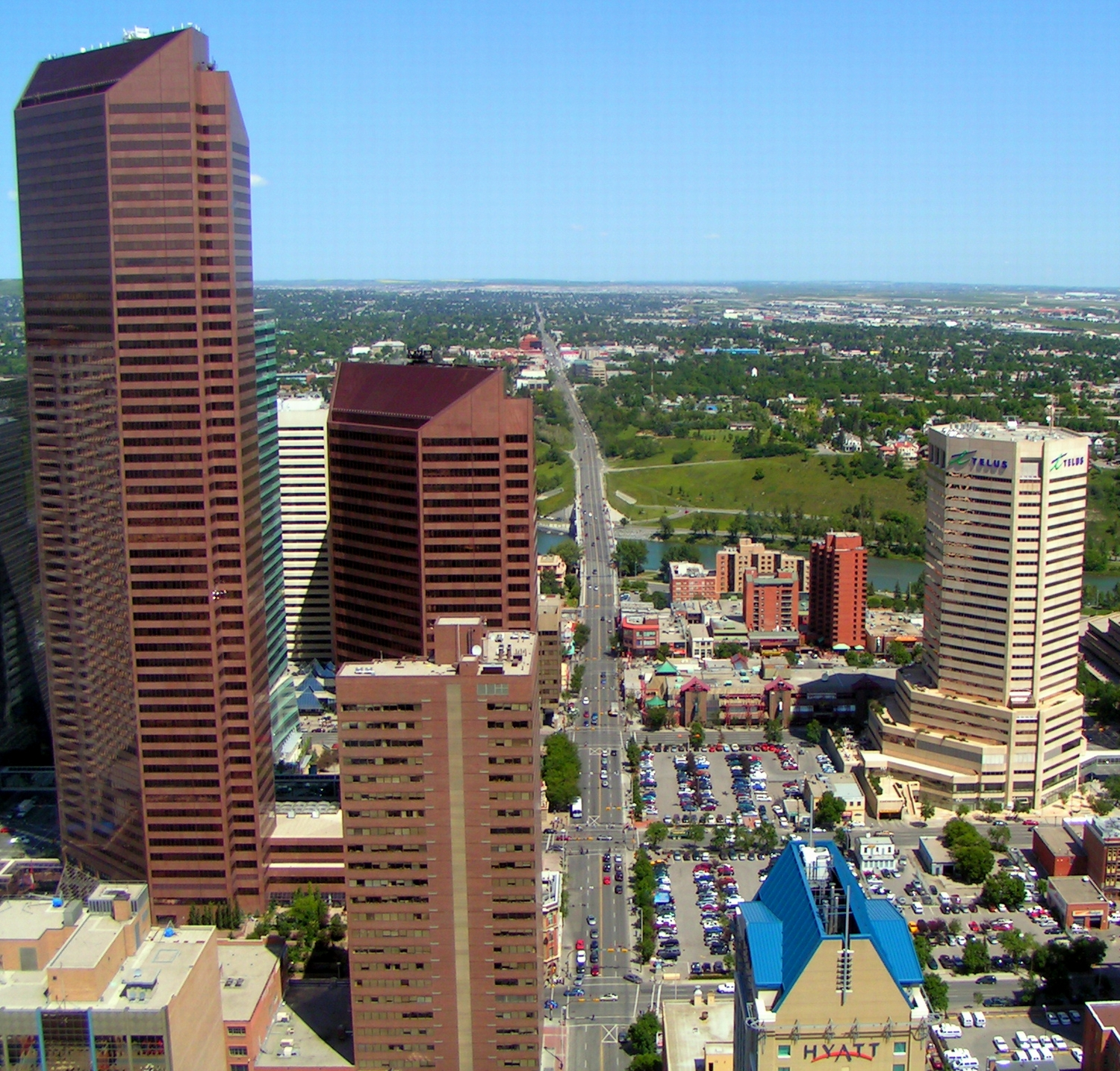
Centre Street, seen from Calgary Tower

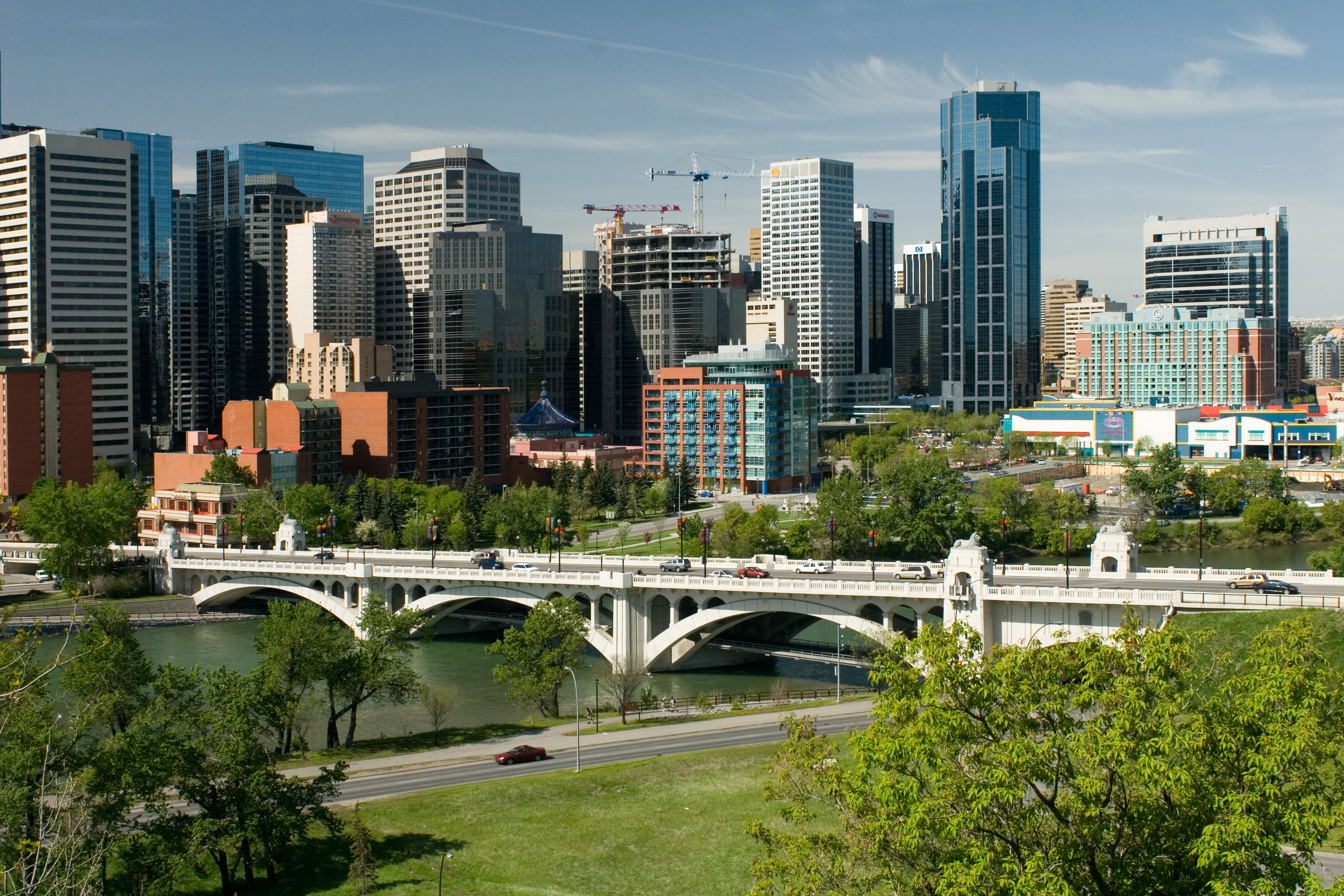
Centre Street Bridge over Bow River

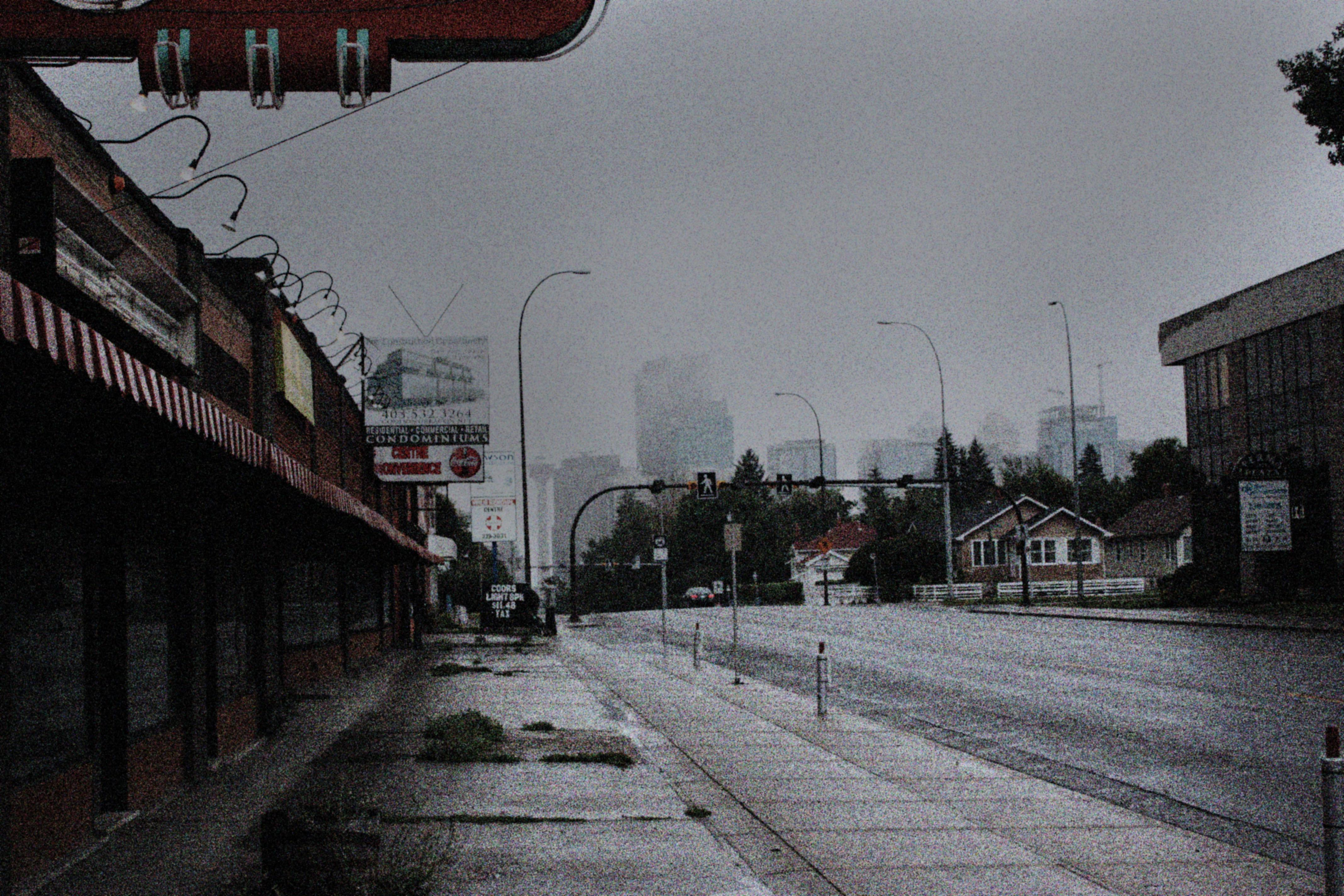
Centre Street North

Centre Street is a major road in Calgary, Alberta, Canada, and defines the east and west halves of the city for the purposes of street addresses (i.e. NW, SW, NE, SE).

== Route description ==
The main segment of Centre Street is an arterial road that extends from 9 Avenue S, at the base of the Calgary Tower in Downtown Calgary. The roadway passes through Chinatown, crosses the Bow River, to the Beddington Boulevard, after which it becomes a residential street and becomes unavailable to private vehicular traffic north of Bergen Crescent (the road continues, but it is only accessible to Calgary Transit and emergency vehicles). The road resumes immediately north of the "bus trap" at Beddington Trail, where it continues as Harvest Hills Boulevard. When the roadway crosses Stoney Trail, the name reverts to Centre Street N and the road continues north and exits the city limits at Highway 566.

In the downtown section, Centre Street is lined by some of Calgary's landmark buildings, such as the Encana Bow building, Suncor Energy Centre (formerly Petro-Canada Centre), the Dragon City Mall, Telus building, Hyatt Regency hotel and Calgary Tower.

Several non-contiguous sections of Centre Street appear sporadically south of the Calgary Tower, including a segment between 10 Avenue S and 18 Avenue S, also known as Volunteer Way; and a collector road running from 58 Avenue S to Glenmore Trail, where it continues to the south as Fairmount Drive. Macleod Trail forms the division between southwest and southeast quadrants between Glenmore Trail and Highway 22X, while further south the quadrant boundaries are defined by Sheriff King Street.

== Future ==
The Centre Street N / Harvest Hills Boulevard corridor is chosen alignment for the north leg of the proposed CTrain Green Line, running from downtown Calgary to the North Pointe transit terminal near Country Village Road. Harvest Hills Boulevard was constructed with a wide right-of-way to accommodate future LRT construction; however, the section along Centre Street N would require either lane removal or property expropriation. The majority of the rail line would be surface-level, with tunnels at selected major intersections as well as major tunnel across the Bow River and through downtown Calgary. Funding has not been finalized for the project.

== Centre Street Bridge ==
The Centre Street Bridge was built by the City of Calgary in 1916 over the Bow River for $375,000 replacing a steel truss bridge built by a land developer called the Centre Street Bridge Company Limited. It was designed by John F. Green, featured an upper and lower deck, and large cast concrete lions on four massive plinths, two at each end of the bridge.

It went through extensive restoration in 2001, when the bridge was closed for one year. The opening scene of the 2001 Steven Seagal movie Exit Wounds was filmed on the bridge during this closure.

== Calgary Transit Bus Routes ==
The following Calgary Transit bus routes serves Centre Street (as of September 2026, communities served are in parentheses):

- Route 2 Killarney/17th Ave./Mount Pleasant (Beddington Heights, Crescent Heights)
- Route 3 Heritage Station/Sandstone (Crescent Heights, Tuxedo Park, Highland Park, Thorncliffe, Huntington Hills, Beddington Heights)
- Route 4 Huntington (Huntington Hills)
- Route 5 North Haven (Huntington Hills)
- Route 17 Ramsay/Renfrew (Crescent Heights)
- Route 20 Heritage/Northmount (Huntington Hills)
- Route 32 Sunridge/Huntington (Huntington Hills, Beddington Heights)
- Route 46 MacEwan Heights (Beddington Heights, Huntington Hills)
- Route 47 Sandstone (Beddington Heights, Huntington Hills)
- Route 62 Hidden Valley (Crescent Heights, Tuxedo Park, Highland Park, Thorncliffe, Huntington Hills)
- Route 64 MacEwan (Crescent Heights, Tuxedo Park, Highland Park, Thorncliffe, Huntington Hills)
- Route 86 Coventry Hills (Beddington Heights, Huntington Hills)
- Route 109 Harvest Hills (Crescent Heights, Tuxedo Park, Highland Park, Thorncliffe, Huntington Hills, Beddington Heights)
- Route 114 Panorama (Huntington Hills, Beddington Heights)
- Route 116 Coventry Hills (Crescent Heights, Tuxedo Park, Highland Park, Thorncliffe, Huntington Hills, Beddington Heights)
- Route 142 Panorama (Crescent Heights, Tuxedo Park, Highland Park, Thorncliffe, Huntington Hills, Beddington Heights)
- MAX Green Max Green North Pointe/City Centre (Crescent Heights, Tuxedo Park, Highland Park, Thorncliffe, Huntington Hills, Beddington Heights)
- 500 Airport Express/City Centre Express (Thorncliffe, Highland Park, Tuxedo Park, Crescent Heights)
- 503 Symons Valley Express/City Centre Express (Thorncliffe, Highland Park, Tuxedo Park, Crescent Heights)

== Major intersections ==
From south to north. The entire route is in Calgary.

km	mi	Destinations	Notes
0.0	0.0	Fairmount Drive	Continues south
0.0	0.0	Glenmore Trail	Half-diamond interchange; westbound exit, eastbound entrance
0.4	0.25	61 Avenue S	Access to Chinook CTrain station and Chinook Centre
0.8	0.50	58 Avenue S	
4 km (2.5 mi) gap in Centre Street
0.0	0.0	18 Avenue S	
0.1	0.062	17 Avenue S	
0.5	0.31	12 Avenue S	Eastbound, one-way
0.6	0.37	11 Avenue S	Westbound, one-way; Centre Street S station (proposed)
0.7	0.43	10 Avenue S	
145 m (475 ft) gap in Centre Street; separated by the Calgary Tower
0.0	0.0	9 Avenue S	Eastbound one-way.
0.1	0.062	8 Avenue S (Stephen Avenue)	Pedestrian mall, westbound one-way when open to traffic
0.2	0.12	7 Avenue S	Transit mall, transit access only; 1 Street SW & Centre Street stations
0.3	0.19	6 Avenue S	Westbound one-way
0.4	0.25	5 Avenue S	Eastbound one-way; south end of rush-hour lane reversal
0.5	0.31	4 Avenue S	Westbound one-way.
0.8	0.50	2 Avenue S	Connects to Riverfront Avenue
0.9– 1.1	0.56– 0.68	Riverfront Avenue	Overpass (no access), access to Centre Street Bridge lower deck
0.9– 1.1	0.56– 0.68	Centre Street Bridge across the Bow River	
0.9– 1.1	0.56– 0.68	Memorial Drive	Overpass (no access), access to Centre Street Bridge lower deck
2.1	1.3	12 Avenue N	
2.5	1.6	16 Avenue N (Highway 1)	16 Avenue N station (proposed)
2.9	1.8	20 Avenue N	North end of rush-hour lane reversal
4.9	3.0	40 Avenue NW, 41 Avenue NE	
5.7	3.5	McKnight Boulevard	
7.3	4.5	64 Avenue N	
8.3	5.2	4 Street NW, 72 Avenue NE	
9.1	5.7	Beddington Boulevard	Access to Beddington Trail
10.1	6.3	Transit only connection between Centre Street and Harvest Hills Boulevard	
10.1	6.3	Beddington Trail	Trumpet interchange; south end of Harvest Hills Boulevard
11.1	6.9	Country Hills Road, 96 Avenue NE – Airport (YYC)	
12.5	7.8	Country Hills Boulevard	
13.3	8.3	Panamount Boulevard, Country Village Road	
14.8	9.2	Stoney Trail (Highway 201)	Partial cloverleaf interchange; Hwy 201 exit 54); North end of Harvest Hills Boulevard, Centre Street resumes
19.2	11.9	Highway 566 (176 Avenue N)	Calgary city limits; continues north as Range Road 13 into Rocky View County
1.000 mi = 1.609 km; 1.000 km = 0.621 mi: Closed/former; HOV only; Incomplete access; Route transition

== See also ==
- Transportation in Calgary
