= Keoma, Alberta =

Keoma
- Hamlet
- Location of Keoma Keoma (Canada)
- Coordinates: 51.215°N 113.650°W
- Country: Canada
- Province: Alberta
- Region: Calgary Metropolitan Region
- Census division: 6
- Municipal district: Rocky View County

Government
  - Type: Unincorporated
  - Governing body: Rocky View County Council

Area (2021)
  - Land: 0.24 km^{2} (0.093 sq mi)

Population (2021)
  - Total: 95
  - Density: 392.2/km^{2} (1,016/sq mi)
- Time zone: UTC−06:00 (Alberta Time)
- Area codes: 403, 587, 825

Keoma is a hamlet in southern Alberta under the jurisdiction of Rocky View County.

Keoma is located approximately 35 km (21 mi) northeast of Downtown Calgary, on Highway 566, 2.0 km (1.2 mi) east of Highway 9 and 19 km (12 mi) north of the Trans-Canada Highway.

Keoma is an Indigenous name for "over there", far away. The hamlet was settled in 1910 when the Canadian Pacific Railway (CPR) opened up land for irrigation. It is assumed that the CPR named the site, but this is not definitive. The post office was in operation from January 15, 1910, to June 27, 1986.

== Demographics ==
In the 2021 Census of Population conducted by Statistics Canada, Keoma had a population of 95 living in 37 of its 40 total private dwellings, a change of 1.1% from its 2016 population of 94. With a land area of 0.24 km^{2} (0.093 sq mi), it had a population density of 395.8/km^{2} (1,025.2/sq mi) in 2021.

The population of Keoma according to the 2018 municipal census conducted by Rocky View County is 89, an increase from its 2013 municipal census population count of 67.

As a designated place in the 2016 Census of Population conducted by Statistics Canada, Keoma had a population of 104 living in 38 of its 38 total private dwellings, a change of 19.5% from its 2011 population of 87. With a land area of 0.45 km^{2} (0.17 sq mi), it had a population density of 231.1/km^{2} (598.6/sq mi) in 2016.

== See also ==
- List of communities in Alberta
- List of hamlets in Alberta
