= Stoney Trail =

Freeway in Calgary, Alberta

Stoney Trail Tsuut'ina Trail (Note: Only the 9.3-kilometre (5.8 mi) section of the freeway that lies in the Tsuut'ina Nation between Fish Creek and Tsuut'ina Parkway is named Tsuut'ina Trail; the remainder is named Stoney Trail.)
- Highway 201
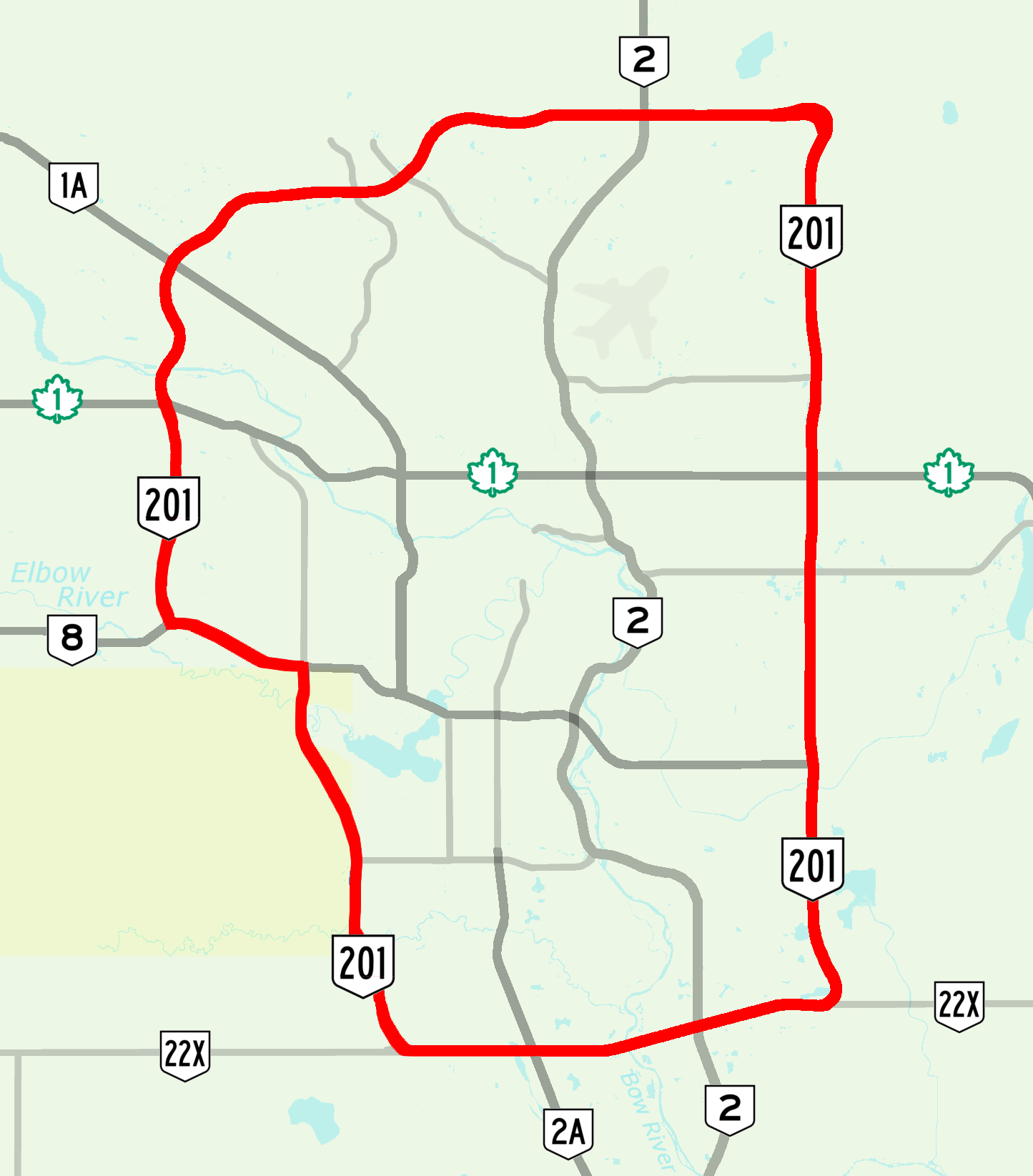
- Stoney Trail / Tsuut'ina Trail highlighted in red

Route information
- Maintained by Alberta Transportation
- Length: 101 km (63 mi)
- History: 2009 (NW/NE legs open); 2013 (SE leg open); 2020 (SW leg north open) (Note: Work on the southwest leg of the freeway was split into 2 sections, deemed by Alberta Transportation as the Priority New Infrastructure (PNI, north segment from Glenmore Trail to 146 Avenue/Fish Creek Blvd) and the Remaining New Infrastructure (RNI, south segment from 146 Avenue to Macleod Trail).); 2021 (SW leg south open); 2023 (W leg open)

Major junctions
- Ring road around Calgary
- Macleod Trail (Highway 2A); Highway 22X; * Anderson Road * Glenmore/Sarcee Trail: Highway 8; Highway 1 (16 Avenue NW); Crowchild Trail (Highway 1A); Highway 2 (Deerfoot Trail NE); Highway 1 (16 Avenue NE); Highway 22X; Highway 2 (Deerfoot Trail SE)

Location
- Country: Canada
- Province: Alberta
- Major cities: Calgary

Highway system
- Alberta Numbered Highway Network; List; Former
← SPF	→ Highway 216

Alberta Highway 201, better known by its official names of Stoney Trail and Tsuut'ina Trail, is a 101-kilometre (63 mi) freeway that encircles Calgary, Alberta. It serves as a bypass for the congested routes of 16 Avenue N and Deerfoot Trail through Calgary (Highways 1 and 2, respectively), and also forms part of the CANAMEX Corridor which connects Calgary to Edmonton and Interstate 15 in the United States via Highways 2, 3, and 4. Traffic levels have quickly risen, and in 2025 the six-lane ring road carried nearly 100,000 vehicles per day at its busiest point near Beddington Trail in north Calgary.

The official starting point of the ring is at Deerfoot Trail in southeast Calgary, with exit numbers increasing clockwise along the road. West of Deerfoot, it crosses the Bow River and Macleod Trail before turning north and becoming Tsuut'ina Trail as it crosses Fish Creek into the Tsuutʼina Nation. North of the Elbow River, the name reverts to Stoney Trail as the highway bends west to a split from Highway 8. It turns north across Highway 1 and a second crossing of the Bow River near Canada Olympic Park to Crowchild Trail, winding through the hills of northwest Calgary to Deerfoot Trail and the southern end of the Queen Elizabeth II Highway. Turning south, the ring again intersects Highway 1 and Glenmore Trail, and curves west at the neighbourhood of Mahogany back to Deerfoot Trail, completing the ring.

The freeway's "Stoney" name is derived from the Nakoda First Nation, one of several major thoroughfares in the region that bear Indigenous names. Construction first began in northwest Calgary as an expressway in the 1990s, incrementally extending clockwise towards Deerfoot Trail before two public–private partnership (P3) projects completed the northeast and southeast sections in 2009 and 2013, respectively. After decades of attempting to acquire right of way from the adjacent Tsuutʼina Nation for the penultimate southwest portion of the road, Alberta finally struck a CA$275 million deal in 2013 with the Nation that included a transfer of Crown land and other compensation, allowing completion of the southwest quadrant in 2021. A final short segment between Highways 1 and 8 opened in 2023, some 70 years after Calgary city planners had first presented plans for the ring road.

== Route description ==
Stoney Trail encircles all of Calgary. The northern and southern sections create a northern and eastern bypass link between Highway 1 (Trans-Canada Highway) and Deerfoot Trail (Highway 2). Most of the highway is 6 lanes except for several short 8 lane sections in West Calgary and a 4 lane section in Northeast Calgary.

=== West Calgary ===
Due to the western side of the city being located in the outer limits of the Rocky Mountain foothills the west section of Stoney Trail intersects several hills and valleys with many stream crossings, broad sweeping curves and moderately steeps hills as it navigates its way through rolling terrain.

Alberta Transportation defines the interchange between Stoney Trail and Deerfoot Trail (Highway 2) in Southern Calgary as the starting and ending point of the ring road with exits numbered clockwise. Starting from this interchange Stoney Trail heads west and immediately dips into the Bow River valley and crosses the river. After exiting the valley it passes through an interchange at Chaparral Boulevard/Sun Valley Drive before meeting Macleod Trail at a free flowing combination interchange. From here the highway continues west through two more interchanges (6th Street/Sheriff King St and Spruce Meadows Drive/James McKevitt Road) before reaching a left hand exit for Highway 22X where Stoney Trail curves north.

From here the highway follows the western edge of the city passing through interchanges at 162nd Avenue and Fish Creek Boulevard before crossing Fish Creek itself on a pair of bridges carrying 8 lanes of traffic. At this point Stoney Trail enters the Tsuu T'ina Nation Reservation and Highway 201's name changes to Tsuut'ina Trail to reflect this. The highway continues past a major new shopping development on the reservation serviced by a small half-diamond interchange at 130th Avenue and a larger combination interchange at Anderson Road. It then veers away from the edge of the city cutting through a corner of the reservation and passing a small interchange for 90th Avenue. It then descends across a wide causeway to cross the Elbow River on a 10 lane bridge before meeting Glenmore Trail and Sarcee Trail and two smaller roads in a very large free flowing combination Interchange. Here the highway turns west exiting the Tsuu T'ina Reservation, once again becoming Stoney Trail. After passing an interchange at 69th Street/Discovery Ridge Boulevard Stoney Trail reaches a directional T interchange with Highway 8 where the ring road once again turns north and ascends Coach Hill passing through 3 interchanges (17th Avenue, Bow Trail and Old Banff Coach Road) before dropping down a steep excavated cut to meet Highway 1 in another large free flowing combination interchange.

After passing through the Highway 1 interchange, 8 lanes of Stoney Trail cross the Bow River on a pair of high bridges before passing through an interchange at Nose Hill Drive and ascending a long hill past another interchange at Tuscany Boulevard/Scenic Acres Link and then a large modified cloverleaf interchange at Crowchild Trail (Highway 1A). From here the highway levels out and begins to make a broad turn through Northwest Calgary passing through interchanges at Country Hills Boulevard, Sarcee Trail, Shaganappi Trail and Beddington Trail before crossing West Nose Creek. It then climbs up a small hill, turns completely east and passes through interchanges at 14th Street, Harvest Hills Boulevard/Center Street and 11th Street before reaching the large free flowing combination interchange at Deerfoot Trail (Highway 2) which is one of the largest Interchanges in Western Canada by footprint area.

The section of Stoney/Tsuut'ina Trail between Highway 22X and Highway 8 has an extremely wide median to allow for future expansion of up to 16 lanes if required.

=== East Calgary ===
Unlike in West Calgary, the terrain in East Calgary is relatively flat, with only bumps in the terrain. Therefore, Stoney Trail follows a straight alignment with only two significant corners at the NE and SE edges of the city. It has no hills or stream crossing along its length as it does not intersect any valleys. The interchanges on the east section tend to be more spaced apart than on the west section.

Shortly after passing through the interchange at Deerfoot Trail, Stoney Trail passes through another interchange at Metis Trail. It then bends around a 90 degree corner to head straight south along the eastern edge of the city. It passes through interchanges at Country Hills Boulevard, Airport Trail and McKnight Boulevard before entering a free flowing combination interchange at Highway 1. From there it continues straight south along flat terrain passing through several more interchanges at 17th Avenue, Peigan Trail, Glenmore Trail and 114th Avenue before intersecting Highway 22X in a combination interchange where Stoney Trail makes another 90 degree turn to begin heading west. After passing an interchange at 52nd street Stoney Trail reaches the combination Interchange at Deerfoot Trail (Highway 2) that marks the starting and ending point for the ring road. The entire freeway has a posted speed limit of 100 km/h (62 mph).

=== Lane count ===
Despite being a relatively new highway, some sections of Stoney Trail have seen upgrades since they opened, including lane additions.

Segment	Location	No. of lanes	Length	Year opened
Southwest	Deerfoot Tr S. to Highway 8	6-10 lanes	29.3 km (18.2 mi)	2020–2021
West	Highway 8 to 16th Ave W.	6-8 lanes	6.7 km (4.2 mi)	2023
Northwest	16 Ave W. to Deerfoot Tr N.	6 lanes	23.0 km (14.3 mi)	1995–2009
Northeast	Deerfoot Tr N. to 16 Ave E.	4-6 lanes	20.9 km (13.0 mi)	2009
Southeast	16 Ave E. to Deerfoot Trail S.	6-8 lanes	22.6 km (14.0 mi)	2013
Number of through lanes on Stoney Trail / Tsuut'ina Trail (excludes ongoing projects)

== History ==
Planning for the Calgary and Edmonton ring roads began in the 1970s when Alberta developed some restricted development areas in a corridor of land then mostly outside the developed civic areas for future infrastructure, including high-speed ring-road systems. This land is also known as the Transportation and Utility Corridor (TUC), as land set aside for future road and utility purposes. Land acquisition started in 1974, and by the time the ring road projects were initiated, Alberta had acquired 97% of the lands. The Calgary TUC failed to include a corridor in southwest Calgary between Glenmore Trail and Highway 22X. The City of Calgary is bounded along 37 Street SW by the Tsuut'ina Nation. The developed areas of Calgary had already reached 37 Street SW around the Glenmore Reservoir inhibiting the ability of the government to impose an RDA. The missing link in the TUC map created uncertainty in the future positioning of the southwest leg of the freeway. In 2013, a land acquisition agreement was signed by Alberta with the Tsuut'ina Nation, and construction began in 2016.

=== Northwest leg ===
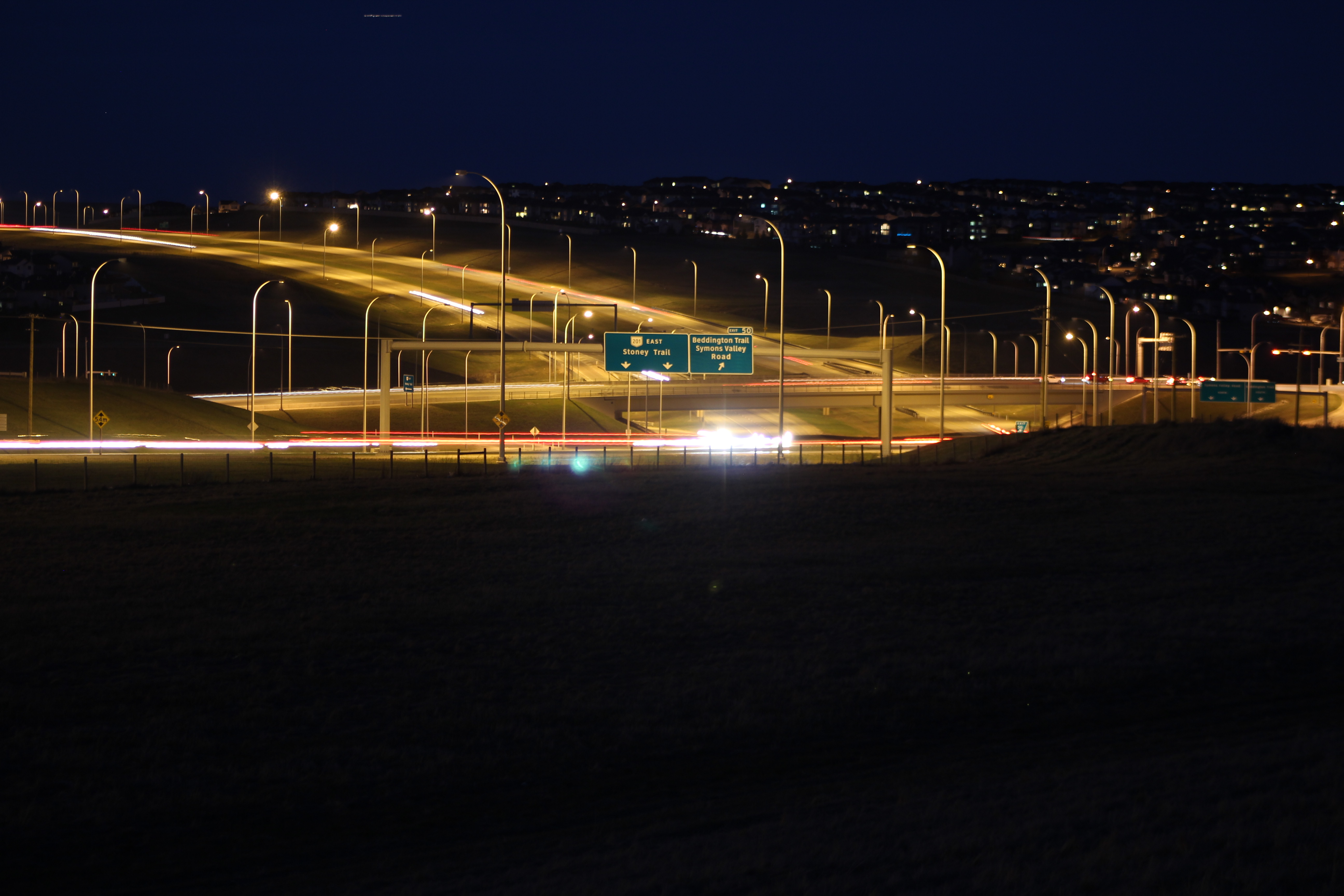
Beddington Trail crossing over Stoney Trail looking east.

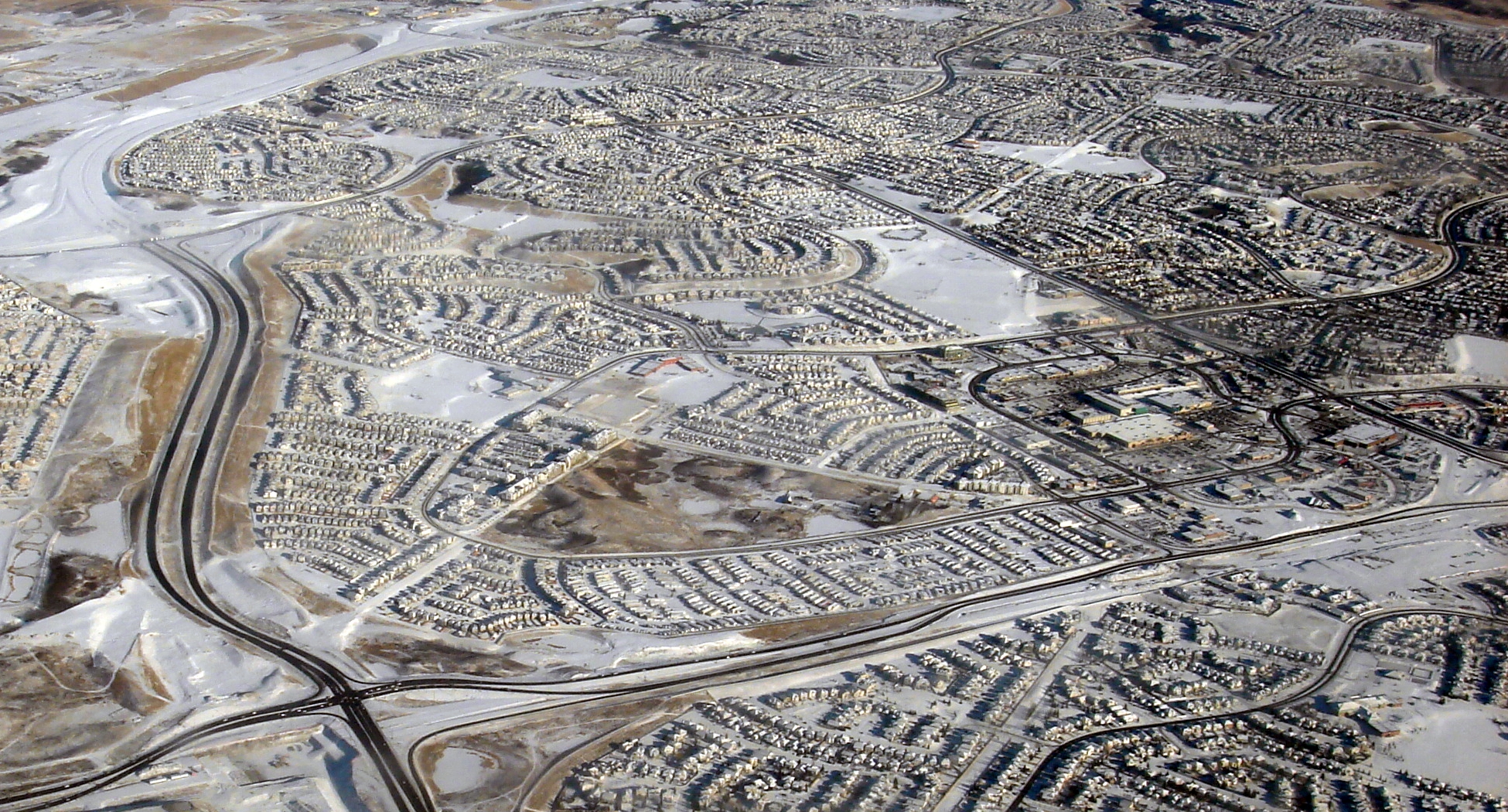
Stoney Trail at Crowchild Trail

The northwest quadrant of the ring road was the first to be constructed. In the mid-1990s, the province of Alberta built the first segment around the Bow River Bridge connecting Highway 1 with Crowchild Trail. This was subsequently extended to Country Hills Boulevard. In 2003, the province announced plans for a 17-kilometre (11 mi) extension east to Deerfoot Trail. The original design was limited in scope and incorporated two interchanges, one flyover and two signalized intersections with completion scheduled in 2007 at a cost of $250 million. In January 2005, the province announced an increase in scope of the project with the addition of three additional interchanges at Crowchild Trail, Country Hills Boulevard and Scenic Acres Link. In addition to increasing costs, the project was delayed and the full extension to Deerfoot Trail was not opened until November 2, 2009, although some sections were opened earlier. The portion of the ring road between Harvest Hills Boulevard and Deerfoot Trail opened to traffic on November 2, 2009. 30,000 to 40,000 vehicles were expected to use this segment daily. Actual peak traffic volumes exceeded 40,000 vpd between Crowchild Trail and Country Hills Boulevard in 2010.

The northwest ring road opened on November 2, 2009, with traffic signals at Harvest Hills Boulevard but grading was completed for a future possible interchange. On November 25, 2009, the province announced construction of the Harvest Hills Boulevard Interchange to be opening in fall 2010. The cost of the interchange project was $14 million. The interchange opened to traffic in 2010.

A signalized intersection was initially constructed at Beddington Trail and Symons Valley Road, but it was upgraded to an interchange when the project was finished in 2009. This interchange opened in July 2009, when the segment from Sarcee Trail to Harvest Hills Boulevard was opened a few months ahead of the full extension to Deerfoot Trail. Originally, Alberta Transportation intended only to construct a flyover at Shaganappi Trail, with no connections to the northwest ring road when the project was initiated but was upgraded to an interchange when the project was finished in 2009. This interchange opened in July 2009 when the segment from Sarcee Trail to Harvest Hills Boulevard was opened a few months ahead of the full extension to Deerfoot Trail.

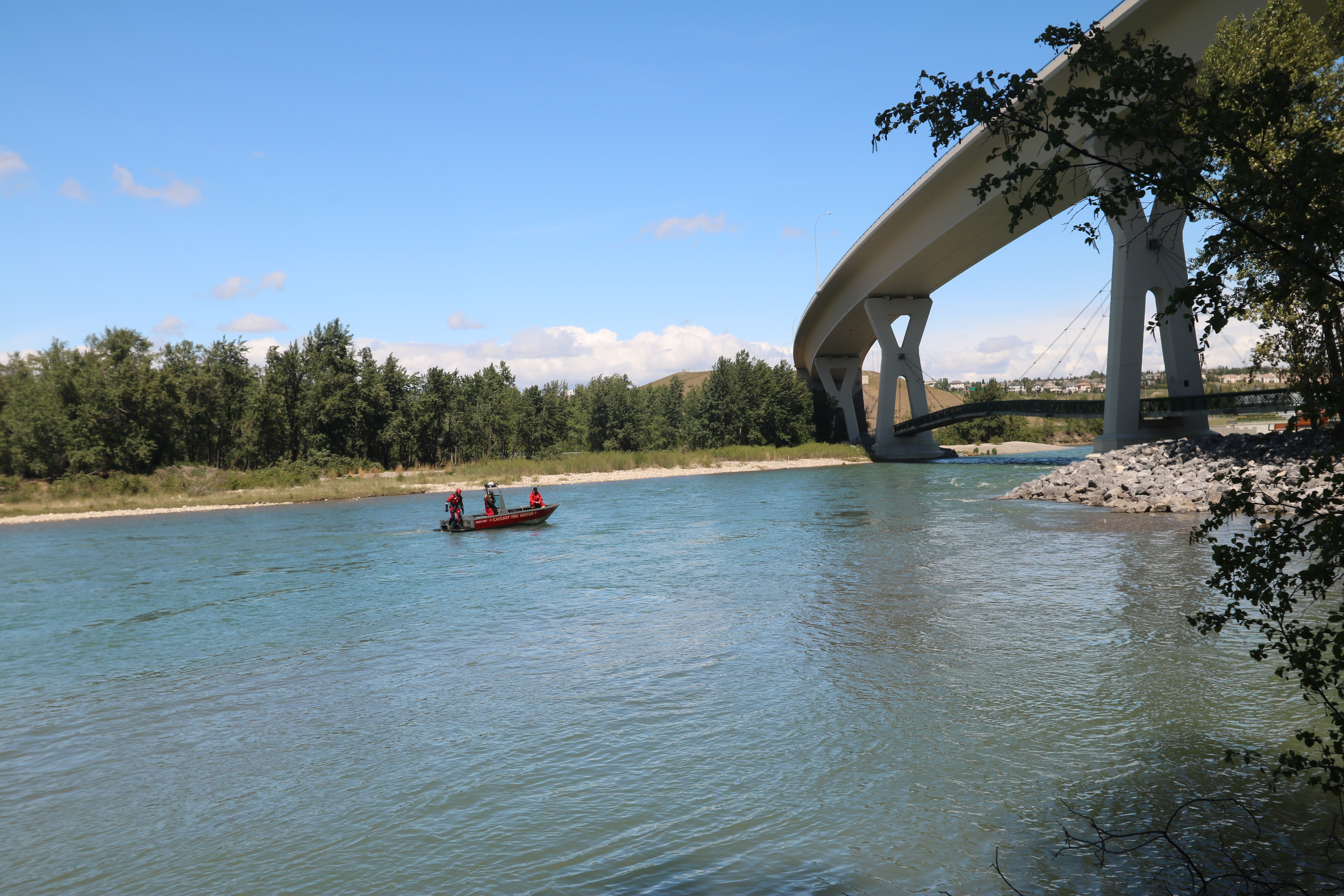
The bridge carrying Stoney Trail over the Bow River near Canada Olympic Park was twinned as part of work on the final leg of the ring

At Sarcee Trail a signalized intersection was initially constructed, but upgraded to an interchange when the project was completed. The segment from Country Hills Boulevard to Sarcee Trail was opened on November 25, 2008, a year ahead of the full extension to Deerfoot Trail. An interchange at Country Hills Boulevard was added to the northwest ring road project in January 2005 to replace the original signalized intersection built when this segment of the ring road was built in the 1990s. The original project scope had this remaining as a signalized intersection. The interchange opened to traffic in September 2008.

A new interchange was announced on January 28, 2005, for Crowchild Trail as part of an upgrade to the $250 million project. Plans to extend the CTrain resulted in changes to the design of the interchange. The Crowchild Interchange was constructed along a pre-existing portion of Stoney Trail, and the design was modified to be free-flowing and to include an LRT bridge to allow for the CTrain to be extended west to Tuscany station. The Crowchild interchange fully opened to traffic on September 28, 2011.

In January 2005, an interchange at Tuscany Boulveard/Scenic Acres Link was added. The full interchange opened to traffic in the fall of 2009. Following the completion of the Crowchild Trail interchange, the only remaining traffic signals were at the intersection with Nose Hill Drive. Aecom was retained in the spring of 2010 to plan, design and administer construction of this interchange to be open in the fall of 2012. Design and public information delays caused Alberta Transportation to revise its expectations and it was announced that construction of the interchange would commence in early 2011 and be completed in the fall of 2013. However, the tender process was slow to be initiated and it was not until November 17, 2011, that Alberta Transportation announced the Nose Hill Drive interchange would be built by Acciona Infrastructure Canada at a cost of $67 million and be opened to traffic in the fall of 2014.

=== Northeast leg ===
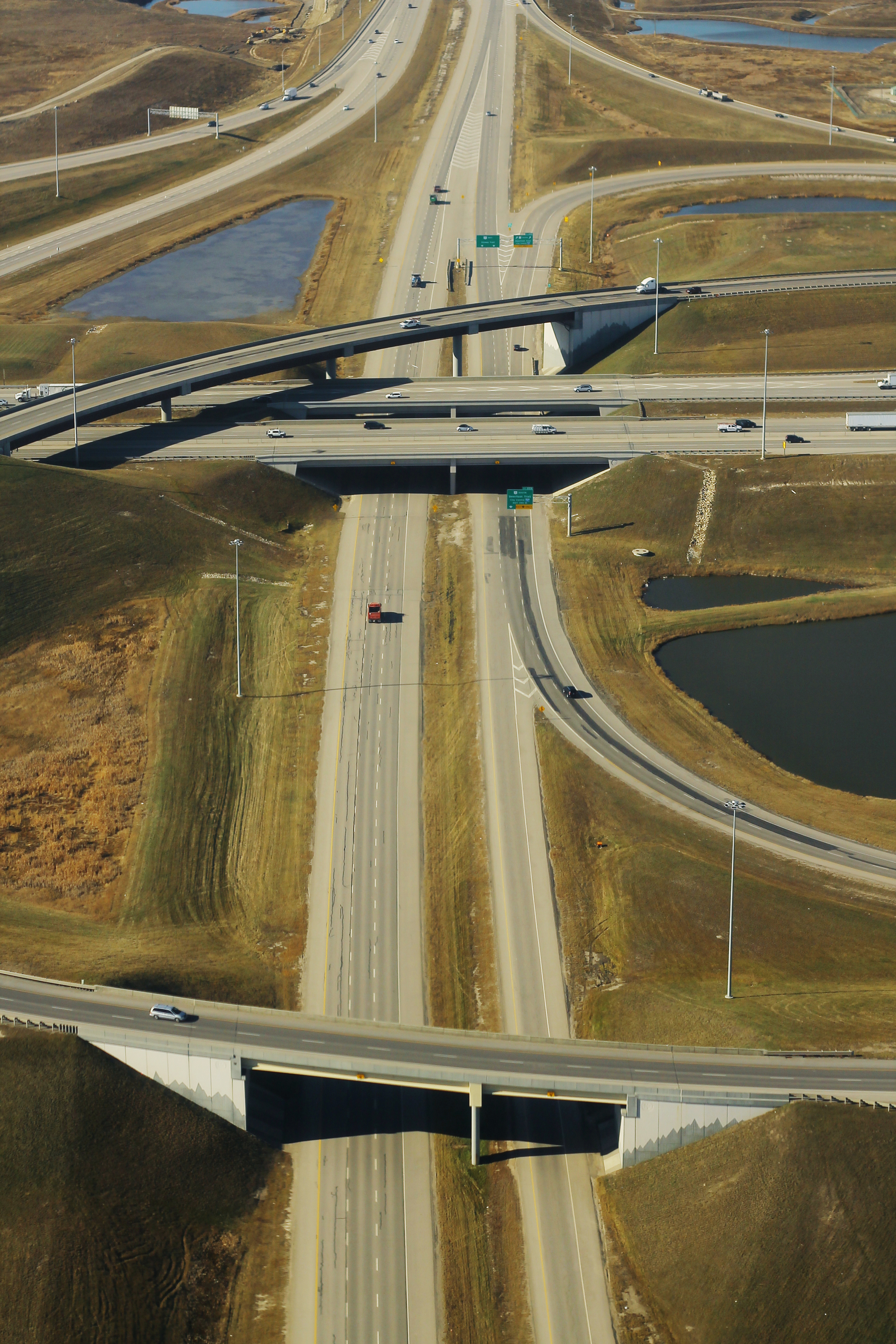
Looking west on Stoney Trail NE at its interchange with Deerfoot Trail

Construction of the 21 km (13 mi) northeast portion of the freeway began in 2007 and opened to traffic on November 2, 2009, connecting the Deerfoot Trail interchange to 17 Avenue SE (formerly Highway 1A). In December 2005, Calgary had announced it was in talks with the province to expedite construction, and on February 22, 2007, Alberta's Ministry of Infrastructure and Transportation awarded a contract to the Stoney Trail Group public-private partnership consortium (P3) for construction of the project's first stage, and maintenance of the northwest and northeast sections of the ring road for 30 years following completion.

Major interchanges along the northeast route include Métis Trail (which serves as an alternate link to the CrossIron Mills shopping area north of the city) Country Hills Boulevard, McKnight Boulevard, and 16 Avenue NE (Highway 1). A partial cloverleaf interchange was built at Métis Trail, a north–south expressway. The City of Calgary opened the extension of Métis Trail between 80 and 96 Avenues NE on October 29, 2011. Right-in/right-out ramps to 60 Street NE from eastbound Stoney Trail were completed on November 22, 2019. Grading has been completed for a future interchange at 60 Street NE that will be completed when required, and may also be future right of way for a CTrain extension. On October 12, 2011, 96 Avenue was opened from Stoney Trail west to 60 Street NE, accessible only from the south. The diamond interchange at McKnight Boulevard will be upgraded into a partial cloverleaf interchange when required. The project included a large cloverstack interchange at 16 Avenue NE.

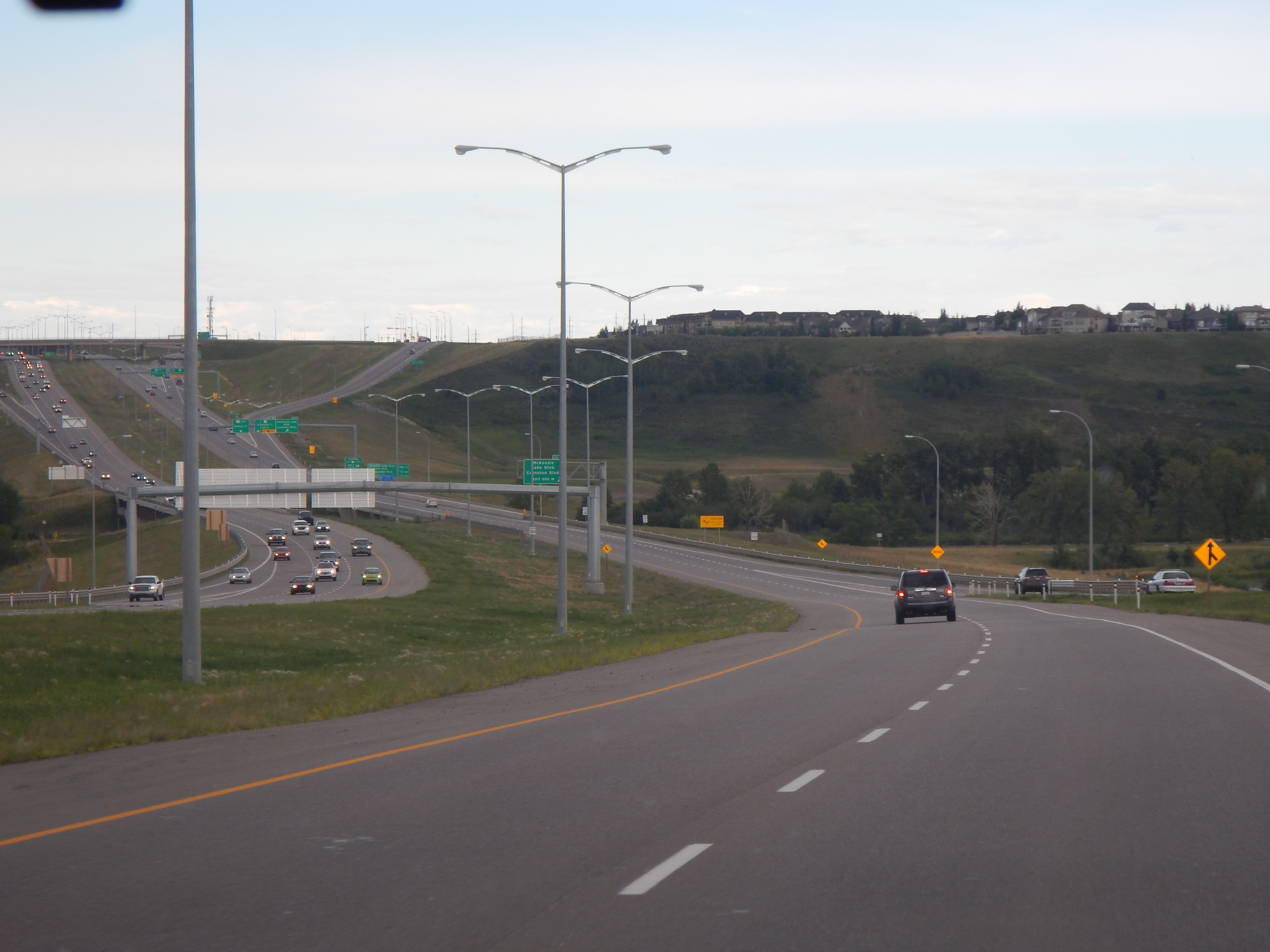
Stoney Trail crossing the Bow River in southern Calgary.

=== Southeast leg ===
On March 2, 2009, the Alberta Government announced construction would be proceeding on the remaining portion of the East Freeway from 17 Avenue SE to Highway 22X, as well as improvements to the existing Highway 22X roadway between that location and just east of the Macleod Trail (Highway 2A) interchange. This portion, like the northeastern portion, was built as a P3. Three firms bid on the contract: Chinook Partnership, SEConnect and SE Calgary Connector Group. The winning bid of $769 million was submitted by Chinook Roads Partnership. Chinook Roads Partnership will also be responsible for maintenance of this portion of the Ring Road, as well as maintenance of Deerfoot Trail between Highway 22X and Highway 2A for 30 years after construction completion.

Construction on the southeast leg began in the spring of 2010, and was opened on November 22, 2013, almost two months behind schedule. The southeast extension of Stoney Trail also resulted in upgrades to Highway 22X between Stoney and Macleod Trails. When the extension opened in 2013, the City officially renamed this portion of 22X as part of Stoney Trail, and the province designated it as part of Highway 201. Highway 22X continues west of Macleod Trail as Spruce Meadows Trail, while 22X continues east of Stoney Trail toward Gleichen.

An interchange was constructed at Sun Valley Boulevard / Chaparral Boulevard, upgraded from the existing intersection. The original project schedule from June 2010 had interchange construction starting in 2010 with construction of the bridge structure in 2011 towards a phased opening in 2012–2013.

The McKenzie Lake Boulevard / Cranston Boulevard intersection was upgraded to a modified diamond interchange; work on this interchange began 2010 and by fall 2011 the bridge structure had been erected. The interchange design is a modified diamond and integrates into the nearby cloverstack interchange at Deerfoot Trail.

A partial cloverleaf interchange was constructed at 52 Street SE. The original project schedule from June 2010 had this interchange fully opening in the fall of 2013 with traffic on the new structure in the summer of 2012 with construction starting in 2011. The revised project schedule of June 2011 still indicated a fall 2013 opening, the only significant difference is the temporary constructions detour road has been shifted to the east side of the bridge structure from the west side. As of December 2011, construction of the interchange had started with grading of the interchange ramps and piling installation. 52 Street interchange was completed with the rest of the project on November 22, 2013. At 88 Street SE, Stoney Trail intersects with 22X with a hybrid interchange. An existing intersection at 88 Street SE was removed. Grading was also completed for a future interchange at 130 Avenue. A similar partial cloverleaf interchange was constructed at a slightly realigned 114 Avenue SE. The interchange fully opened on November 22, 2013.

Partial cloverleaf interchanges were constructed at Glenmore and Peigan Trails. Peigan Trail was also extended from 52 Street to Stoney Trail as a result. The existing 17 Avenue SE intersection, which had been the terminus of the freeway since 2009, was upgraded to a partial cloverleaf interchange.

=== Southwest leg ===
On October 1, 2020, the northern section of the southwest leg of Stoney Trail opened. This extended the total length by 9 km, from Glenmore Trail to Fish Creek Boulevard. This section was built on the Tsuut'ina Nation, and was brought with many delays. Construction began in 2016, and the segment that goes through the nation is designated as Tsuut'ina Trail. The final 4 km connecting Fish Creek Boulevard to Highway 22X opened one year later, on October 2, 2021. The southwest leg extended Stoney Trail from Macleod Trail to Highway 8, continuing west towards the next section that at the time was under construction.

=== West leg ===
The west leg, connecting Highway 8 to Highway 1 on the west side of Calgary, began construction in 2019 and was originally sechduled to be completed in Fall 2023. The project was delayed to a completion date of April 2024. By the beginning of October 2023, a portion of this leg from Bow Trail SW to Highway 1 was opened for use. On December 19, 2023, the last remaining leg of Stoney Trail was fully completed many months ahead of the anticipated completion date and only about 1–2 months delayed from the original. A ribbon cutting ceremony was held the day before including speeches from government officials, including Premier Danielle Smith and Calgary Mayor Jyoti Gondek. The completion and opening of this leg marked the completion of Highway 201 that now completely encircles the city of Calgary.

=== Since completion ===
When the northwest section of Stoney Trail opened in 2009, grading was prepared for future A4 partial cloverleaf interchanges at 14 Street NW and 11th Street NE. For many years there was a right-in-right-out access south of Stoney Trail into the Panorama Hills neighbourhood at 14th Street. Planning for the construction of a right-in-right-out access north of Stoney Trail at 14th Street was announced in 2014 and completed the following year. The City of Calgary began construction of a full interchange at the 14th Street location in 2019 which was completed by September 2021. Construction on a trumpet interchange only accessing 11th Street to the north of the Stoney Trail began in 2019, and was completed by 2023. No schedule has been set for constructing the other half of the interchange which would connect to a future 11th Street south of Stoney Trail to service undeveloped industrial land bounded to the east by Deerfoot Trail, north by Stoney Trail, west by the CPKCR right-of-way, and south by Country Hills Boulevard.

During the summer of 2021 a 14 kilometre section of Stoney Trail in East Calgary between Airport Trail and 17 Ave E was widened from 4 to 6 lanes.

Between 2021 and 2023 the City of Calgary twinned the overpasses at the Shaganappi Trail and Harvest Hills Blvd/Center Street interchanges to increase through lane capacity on the connecting roads from a total of 3 to 6 lanes in response to new development north of Stoney Trail.

In late 2020, the Government of Alberta announced a plan to replace the existing eastbound Stoney Trail bridge over the Bow River in south Calgary, widen the westbound bridge and build a new, stand-alone pedestrian bridge. The project had increased the number of lanes to four in each direction — originally the eastbound crossing had two lanes, while the westbound had three. In January 2021 PCL Construction won a $48 million contract for the project. The Alberta government first estimated the project would cost a total of $70 million, but later said the total estimated cost – which includes engineering and utility relocations – has decreased to $60 million. Construction on the project started in April 2021 and was expected to be completed in fall 2023 but was delayed to early 2024.

In 2023 the city of Calgary began the construction of a flyover at 80th Avenue NE to connect to a new neighbourhood east of Stoney Trail. The single lane flyover will not be open for regular road traffic and will only be used by transit, emergency vehicles and active transportation.

== Future ==
The Calgary ring road is designed with expansion in mind. All sections of the highway are designed to support a future 8 to 10 lanes without major interchange rebuilds while the section between Highway 22X and Highway 8 is designed to hold a future 16 lanes in an express-collector arrangement as the Tsuut'tina Nation will prevent another freeway from being built farther from the city in that area. Several incomplete or graded interchanges such as at Highway 22X W (the current free flowing interchange is designed to accommodate a future south leg), 96th Avenue, 11th Street, 36th Street (north), Airport Trail and 130th Avenue are designed to be built into full interchanges when required. There is also a right of way for a major free flowing interchange at the northeast corner of the ring that will connect to a future bypass of Airdrie.

The Alberta Ministry of Transportation and Economic Corridors' 2024 Construction Program shows a full interchange at Airport Trail is currently in the detailed designed phase and will be constructed within the next couple of years.

== Exit list ==
Exit numbering begins at Deerfoot Trail and increases clockwise.

Location	km	mi	Exit	Destinations	Notes
Calgary	0.0	0.0	Highway 201 (Stoney Trail) continues east towards Highway 22X		
Calgary	0.0	0.0	101	Highway 2 (Deerfoot Trail) – City Centre, Lethbridge	Combination interchange; Hwy 2 exit 234; Stoney Trail travels west; westbound (clockwise) signed as exits 101A (south) and 101B (north)
Calgary	1.2	0.75	1	McKenzie Lake Boulevard / Cranston Boulevard	Diamond interchange; eastbound on-ramp only access Deerfoot Trail
Calgary	2.5	1.6	Crosses the Bow River		
Calgary	3.6	2.2	3	Sun Valley Boulevard / Chaparral Boulevard	Diamond interchange
Calgary	5.7	3.5	5	Highway 2A south (Macleod Trail) – City Centre, Lethbridge	Combination interchange
Calgary	6.9	4.3	7	6 Street SW / Sheriff King Street	Eastbound exit and westbound entrance
Calgary	8.4	5.2	8	James McKevitt Road / Spruce Meadows Way – Spruce Meadows	Partial cloverleaf interchange
Calgary	10.7	6.6	9	Highway 22X west – Bragg Creek	Combination interchange; Stoney Trail turns north
Calgary	12.1	7.5	12	162 Avenue SW	Partial cloverleaf interchange
Calgary	13.7	8.5	13	Fish Creek Boulevard / 146 Avenue SW	Partial cloverleaf interchange
Calgary	13.7	8.5	Tsuut′ina Trail south end		
Calgary (Note: East of Hwy 201); Tsuut'ina Nation (Note: West of Hwy 201)	14.8	9.2	Crosses Fish Creek		
Calgary; Tsuut'ina Nation	15.6	9.7	15	130 Avenue SW / Buffalo Run Boulevard	Half diamond interchange with roundabouts; Northbound exit and southbound entrance
Calgary; Tsuut'ina Nation	17.2	10.7	17	Anderson Road	Combination interchange
Calgary; Tsuut'ina Nation	17.2	10.7	17	Buffalo Run Boulevard	Southbound exit and northbound entrance; southbound access 130 Avenue SW
Tsuut'ina Nation	20.4	12.7	20	90 Avenue SW / Southland Drive	Hybrid Trumpet interchange
Tsuut'ina Nation	22.4	13.9	Crosses the Elbow River		
Tsuut'ina Nation	23.4– 24.7	14.5– 15.3	Tsuut′ina Trail north end		
Tsuut'ina Nation	23.4– 24.7	14.5– 15.3	22	Tsuut'ina Parkway	Interchange under construction; northbound exit and southbound entrance; southbound exit and northbound entrance from Sarcee Trail
Calgary	23.4– 24.7	14.5– 15.3	22	Glenmore Trail east / Sarcee Trail north	Combination interchange
Calgary	23.4– 24.7	14.5– 15.3	24	Westhills Way / Tsuut'ina Parkway	Southbound exit; northbound entrance; Tsuut'ina Parkway under construction (unopened)
Calgary	26.3	16.3	26	69 Street SW / Discovery Ridge Boulevard	Diamond interchange
Calgary	29.3	18.2	28	Highway 8 west – Bragg Creek	Combination interchange
Calgary	31.3	19.4	30	17 Avenue SW	northbound exit and southbound entrance
Calgary	32.9	20.4	32	Bow Trail	Partial cloverleaf interchange
Calgary	34.5	21.4	34	Old Banff Coach Road (Highway 563 west)	Partial cloverleaf interchange Southbound exit and northbound entrance
Calgary	36.0	22.4	36	Highway 1 (16 Avenue NW) – City Centre, Banff	Combination interchange; Hwy 1 exit 177
Calgary	37.1	23.1	Crosses the Bow River		
Calgary	38.2	23.7	38	Nose Hill Drive	Partial cloverleaf interchange
Calgary	39.6	24.6	39	Scenic Acres Link / Tuscany Boulevard	Diamond interchange
Calgary	41.1	25.5	41	Highway 1A (Crowchild Trail) – City Centre, Cochrane	Modified cloverleaf interchange
Calgary	43.4	27.0	43	Country Hills Boulevard	Partial cloverleaf interchange; Stoney Trail turns east
Calgary	46.3	28.8	46	Sarcee Trail	Partial cloverleaf interchange
Calgary	48.1	29.9	48	Shaganappi Trail	Partial cloverleaf interchange; future combination interchange
Calgary	49.9	31.0	50	Beddington Trail / Symons Valley Road	Partial cloverleaf interchange; To Highway 772 north
Calgary	52.5	32.6	52	14 Street NW	Partial cloverleaf interchange with roundabouts
Calgary	54.2	33.7	54	Harvest Hills Boulevard / 1 Street NE	Partial cloverleaf interchange
Calgary	56.5	35.1	57	11 Street NE	Trumpet interchange; future A4 partial cloverleaf interchange
Calgary	59.0	36.7	60	Highway 2 (Deerfoot Trail) – Airport, City Centre, Edmonton	Combination interchange; Hwy 2 exit 271; westbound (counter-clockwise) signed as exits 60A (south) and 60B (north)
Calgary	61.2	38.0	62	Métis Trail	Partial cloverleaf interchange; to Dwight McLellan Trail
Calgary	63.0	39.1	64	60 Street NE	Eastbound right-in/right-out; future interchange; Stoney Trail turns south east of interchange
Calgary	67.2	41.8	68	Country Hills Boulevard	Partial cloverleaf interchange; To Highway 564 east
Calgary	69.2	43.0	70	96 Avenue NE (future Airport Trail)	No northbound entrance; future partial cloverleaf interchange
Calgary	73.6	45.7	74	McKnight Boulevard	Diamond interchange; future partial cloverleaf interchange
Calgary	76.9	47.8	78	Highway 1 (16 Avenue NE) – City Centre, Medicine Hat	Combination interchange
Calgary	80.1	49.8	81	17 Avenue SE	Partial cloverleaf interchange; former Highway 1A
Calgary	82.6	51.3	84	Peigan Trail	Partial cloverleaf interchange
Calgary	86.6	53.8	88	Glenmore Trail	Partial cloverleaf interchange; future combination interchange To Highway 560 east
Calgary	90.1	56.0	91	114 Avenue SE	Partial cloverleaf interchange
Calgary	92.4	57.4	94	130 Avenue SE	Grading only; future half diamond interchange (southbound exit and northbound entrance)
Calgary	94.6	58.8	96	Highway 22X east / 88 Street SE	Combination interchange; Stoney Trail turns west
Calgary	97.3	60.5	99	52 Street SE – South Health Campus	A2 partial cloverleaf interchange; westbound access to Cranston and Auburn Bay
Calgary	99.3 0.0	61.7 0.0	101	Highway 2 (Deerfoot Trail) – City Centre, Lethbridge	Combination interchange; Hwy 2 exit 234; westbound (clockwise) signed as exits 101A (south) and 101B (north)
Calgary	99.3 0.0	61.7 0.0	Highway 201 (Stoney Trail) continues west towards Macleod Trail		
1.000 mi = 1.609 km; 1.000 km = 0.621 mi: Incomplete access; Route transition; Unopened

== See also ==
- Transportation in Calgary
- Anthony Henday Drive
- Deerfoot Trail
- Trans-Canada Highway
