= Kathyrn =

Hamlet in Alberta, Western Canada

- Hamlet
- Location of Kathyrn Kathyrn (Canada)
- Coordinates: 51°13′6″N 113°42′30″W
- Country: Canada
- Province: Alberta
- Region: Calgary Metropolitan Region
- Census division: 6
- Municipal district: Rocky View County

Government
  - Type: Unincorporated
  - Governing body: Rocky View County Council

Area (2021)
  - Land: 1.32 km^{2} (0.51 sq mi)

Population (2021)
  - Total: 21
  - Density: 15.9/km^{2} (41/sq mi)
- Time zone: UTC−06:00 (Alberta Time)
- Area codes: 403, 587, 825

Kathyrn is a hamlet in southern Alberta under the jurisdiction of Rocky View County.

Kathyrn is located approximately 32 km (20 mi) northeast of Downtown Calgary on Highway 566, 1.6 km (1.0 mi) west of Highway 9. A Canadian National Railway line runs northeast through Kathyrn towards Three Hills.

Neil McKay, a local farmer and large landowner, named this hamlet after his daughter. He had offered some of his land to the Grand Trunk Pacific Railway Company in 1911 for a townsite, on the provision that he be permitted to give it a name. When the station was finally built in 1913, the painter who was in charge of the sign misspelled Kathryn and the settlement became known as Kathyrn. The post office opened January 1, 1919.

As a result of the originally error it is common to see the town's name and that of associated entities misspelled "Kathryn". For example, a webpage dedicated to Kathyrn School by the Town of Irricana refers to it as "Kathryn School".

== Demographics ==
In the 2021 Census of Population conducted by Statistics Canada, Kathyrn had a population of 21 living in 6 of its 6 total private dwellings, a change of 110% from its 2016 population of 10. With a land area of 1.32 km^{2} (0.51 sq mi), it had a population density of 15.9/km^{2} (41.2/sq mi) in 2021.

The population of Kathyrn according to the 2018 municipal census conducted by Rocky View County is 13, a decrease from its 2013 municipal census population count of 20.

== See also ==
- List of communities in Alberta
- List of hamlets in Alberta
