= Blood 148A =

Coordinates: 49°02′47″N 113°42′42″W

Blood 148A Blood Timber Reserve
- Indian reserve
- Blood Indian Reserve No. 148A
- Location in Alberta
- First Nation: Kainai
- Treaty: 7
- Country: Canada
- Province: Alberta
- Improvement district: 4 (Waterton)

Area
  - Total: 1,971.7 ha (4,872 acres)

Population (2016)
  - Total: 0
  - Density: 0.0/km^{2} (0.0/sq mi)
- Time zone: UTC−06:00 (Alberta Time)

Blood 148A is an Indian reserve of the Kainai Nation in Alberta, located within Improvement District No. 4. It is on the left bank of the Belly River, about 1.5 miles north of the international boundary.
