= Conrich =

- Hamlet
- Location of Conrich Conrich (Canada)
- Coordinates: 51°05′36″N 113°51′48″W
- Country: Canada
- Province: Alberta
- Region: Calgary Metropolitan Region
- Census division: 6
- Municipal district: Rocky View County

Government
  - Type: Unincorporated
  - Governing body: Rocky View County Council

Area (2021)
  - Land: 0.18 km^{2} (0.069 sq mi)

Population (2021)
  - Total: 15
  - Density: 81.8/km^{2} (212/sq mi)
- Time zone: UTC−06:00 (Alberta Time)
- Area codes: 403, 587, 825

Conrich is a hamlet in southern Alberta under the jurisdiction of Rocky View County.

Conrich is located 3.2 kilometres (2.0 mi) east of the City of Calgary's eastern limits and approximately 14 kilometres (8.7 mi) northeast of Downtown Calgary on McKnight Boulevard. It has been anticipated that the hamlet will eventually be annexed by Calgary. However, Calgary's 2007 annexation did not move its eastern limits closer to the hamlet.

Conrich got its start as a flag station for the Grand Trunk Pacific Railway. A flag station was exactly that: passengers wanting to board had to flag the train down. The land for the site was obtained from W.F. Birch. The railroad reached here in 1913, and the name comes from the surnames of two real estate developers, Connacher and Richardson . The Canadian National Railway took over the line in 1918. That year, a 30,000 bushel grain elevator was also built. A post office operated at this site from August 15, 1925, to December 12, 1960.

== Demographics ==
In the 2021 Census of Population conducted by Statistics Canada, Conrich had a population of 15 living in 7 of its 7 total private dwellings, a change of −25% from its 2016 population of 20. With a land area of 0.18 km^{2} (0.069 sq mi), it had a population density of 83.3/km^{2} (215.8/sq mi) in 2021.

The population of Conrich according to the 2018 municipal census conducted by Rocky View County is 21, a decrease from its 2013 municipal census population of 26.

== See also ==
- List of communities in Alberta
- List of hamlets in Alberta
