= Big Hill Springs Provincial Park =

Provincial park in Alberta, Canada

- IUCN category III (natural monument or feature)
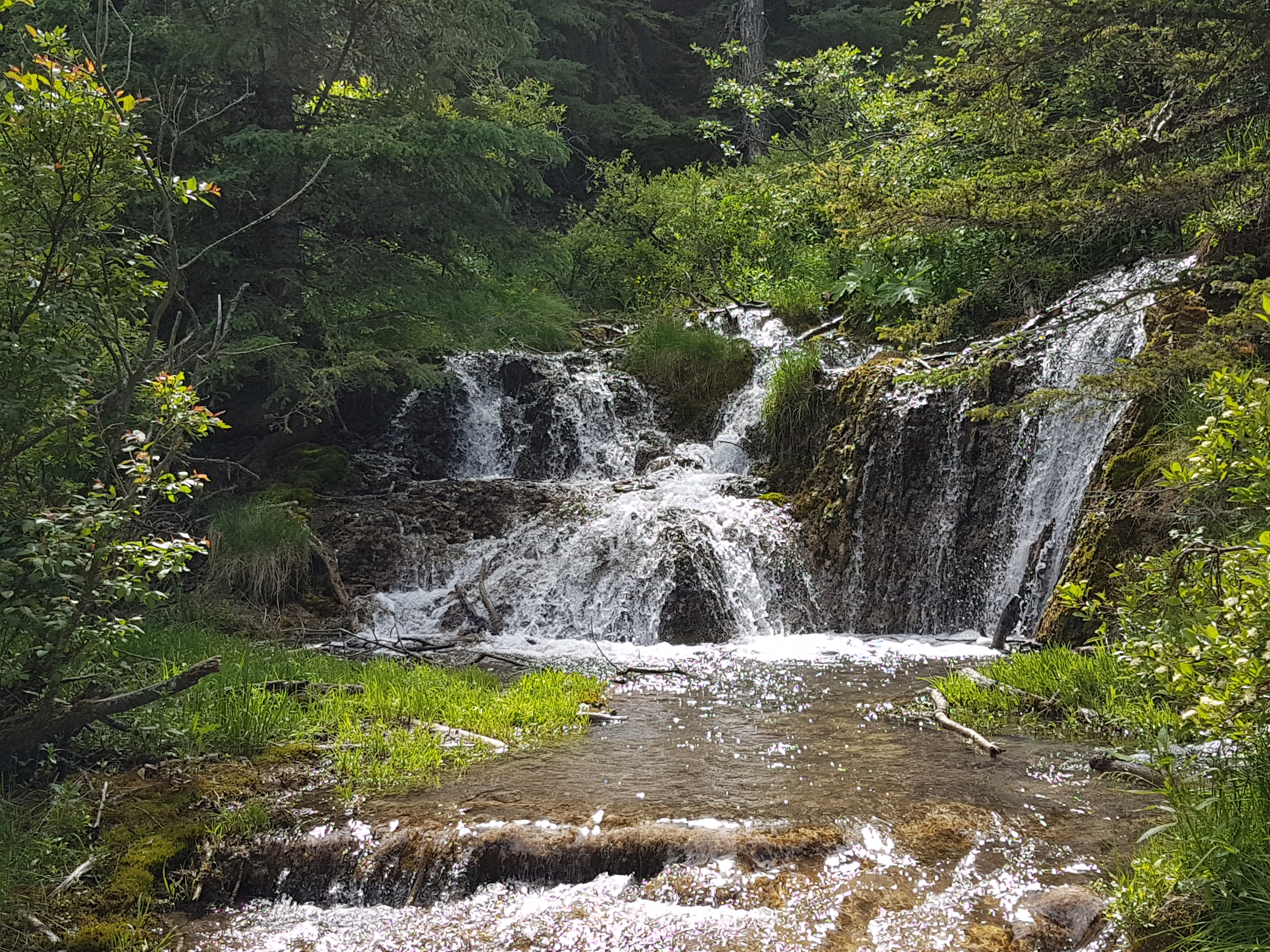

- Location within Alberta
- Interactive map of Big Hill Springs Provincial Park
- Location: Rocky View County; Alberta Canada
- Nearest city: Cochrane
- Coordinates: 51°15′06″N 114°23′13″W
- Area: 0.4 km^{2} (0.15 sq mi)
- Governing body: Alberta Tourism, Parks and Recreation

Big Hill Springs Provincial Park is a provincial park in the foothills of Alberta's Rocky Mountains, about 40 kilometres (20 mi) northwest of Calgary, Alberta, Canada. It features a series of springs and small waterfalls that flow year-round over rocky terraces covered with a lush growth of mosses, shrubs, and grasses. The park also includes the ruins of a historic fish hatchery and Alberta's first commercial creamery. The main activities at the park are hiking, picnicking, scenic viewing, wildlife watching, and photography.

== Natural setting ==
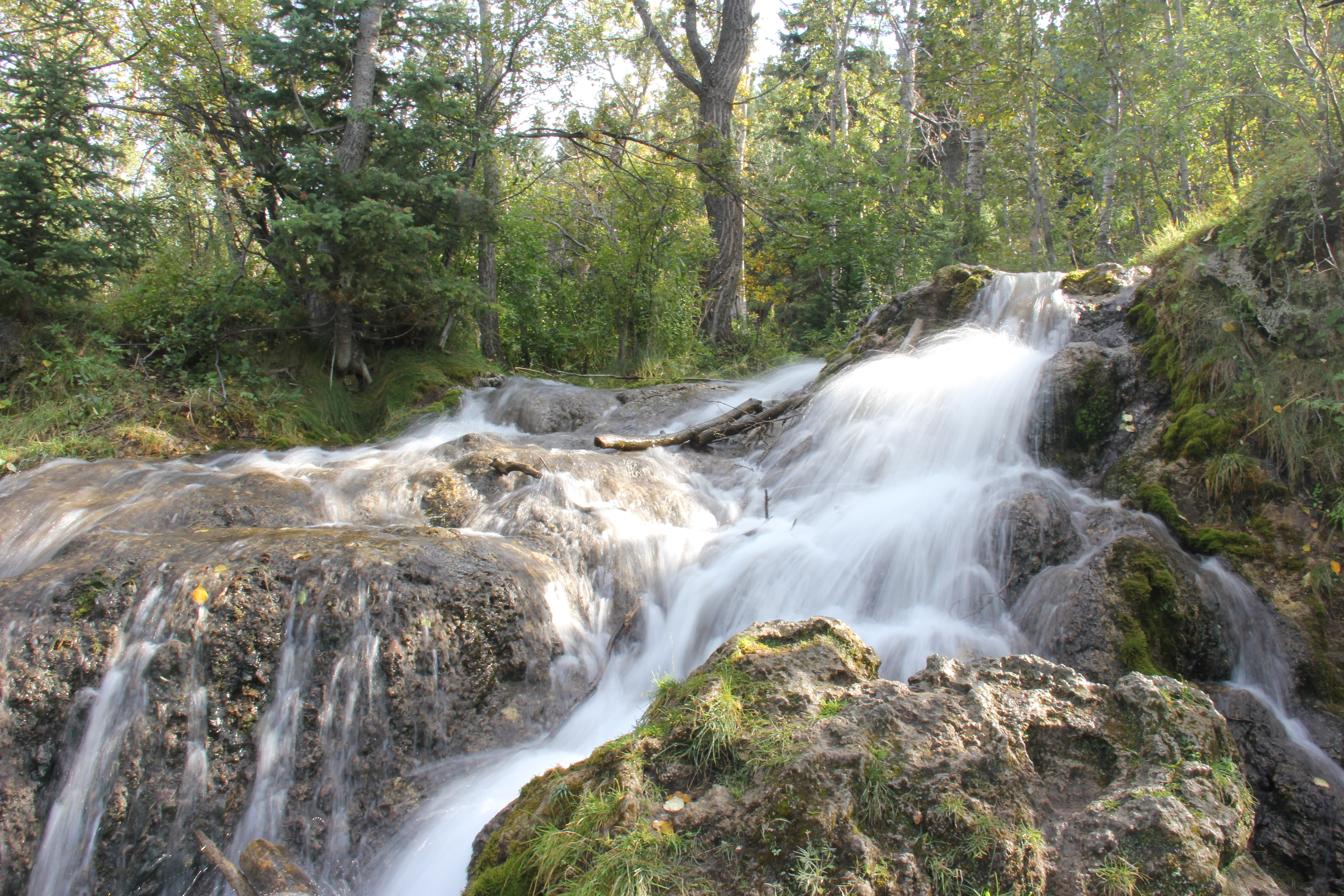
Water flows over lumpy deposits of tufa at Big Hill Springs Provincial Park.

A series of springs feed the small stream that flows through the park, and its waterfalls flow across deposits of tufa that precipitated from the spring water. The springs and stream have consistently high year-round flow rates, which is probably why the old creamery and the fish hatchery were established there.

The spring water comes primarily from a layer of gravel, or sand and gravel, that was deposited by streams that flowed prior to the latest Wisconsin glaciation. The water issues from the contact between those sediments and the underlying bedrock, which is part of the late Paleocene Paskapoo Formation.

When the spring water reaches the surface, dissolved carbon dioxide is released and calcium carbonate precipitates, forming the tufa. The tufa tends to coat plant material such as mosses, twigs, and logs. Casts of plant material can sometimes be seen in the tufa if one looks closely.

The spring-fed stream flows into Big Hill Creek at the east end of the park, which in turn flows into the Bow River at Cochrane. The valley of Big Hill Creek was carved by meltwater flowing from retreating glaciers at the end of the Wisconsin glaciation. Big Hill Creek is now an underfit stream; that is, its current flow rate is not high enough to have carved the valley through which it flows.

== See also ==
- List of provincial parks in Alberta
- List of Canadian provincial parks
- List of National Parks of Canada
