= Hastings Lake, Alberta =

Hastings Lake
- Hamlet
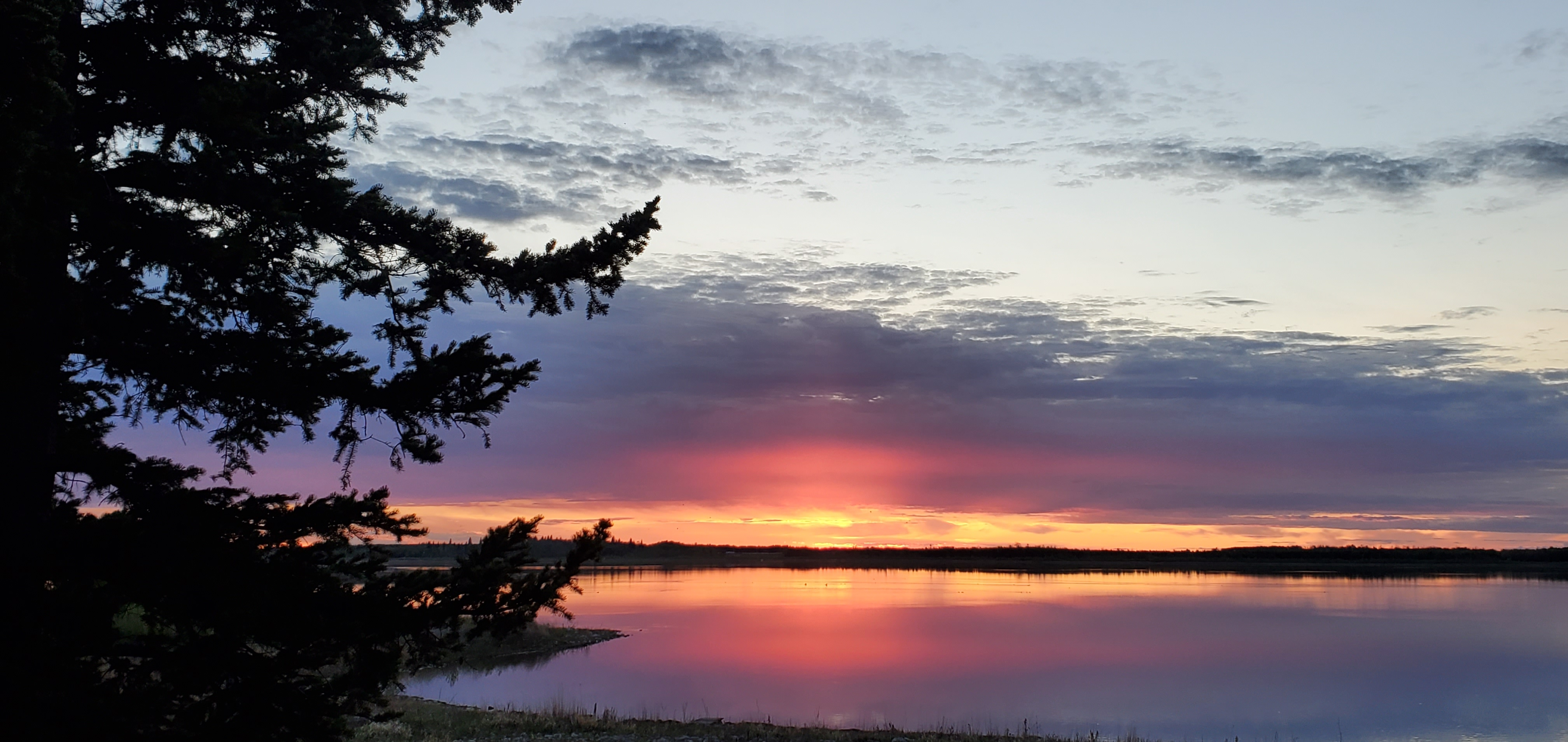
- Hastings Lake

- Location of Hastings lake in Alberta
- Coordinates: 53°24′31″N 112°54′7″W
- Country: Canada
- Province: Alberta
- Region: Edmonton Region
- Census division: 11
- Specialized municipality: Strathcona County
- Settled: 1884

Government
  - Type: Unincorporated
  - Mayor: Rod Frank
  - Governing body: Strathcona County Council: Dave Anderson; Katie Berghofer; Brian Botterill; Linton Delainey; Glen Lawrence; Robert Parks; Paul Smith; Bill Tonita

Area (2021)
  - Land: 0.7 km^{2} (0.27 sq mi)
- Elevation: 744 m (2,441 ft)

Population (2021)
  - Total: 94
  - Density: 134.8/km^{2} (349/sq mi)
- Time zone: UTC−06:00 (Alberta Time)
- Postal code span: T8G
- Area code: +1-780
- Highways: Highway 14
- Website: Strathcona County

Hastings Lake is a hamlet in Alberta, Canada within Strathcona County. It is located on the south shore of Hastings Lake, approximately 40 kilometres (25 mi) southeast of Sherwood Park. It is 1.5 kilometres (0.93 mi) north of Highway 14.

== Demographics ==
The population of Hastings Lake according to the 2024 municipal census conducted by Strathcona County is 110, a 7.8% change from its 2022 municipal census population count of 102.

In the 2021 Census of Population conducted by Statistics Canada, Hastings Lake had a population of 94 living in 48 of its 63 total private dwellings, a change of 0% from its 2016 population of 94. With a land area of 0.7 km^{2} (0.27 sq mi), it had a population density of 134.3/km^{2} (347.8/sq mi) in 2021.

As a designated place in the 2016 Census of Population conducted by Statistics Canada, Hastings Lake had a population of 94 living in 44 of its 80 total private dwellings, a change of 5.6% from its 2011 population of 89. With a land area of 0.73 km^{2} (0.28 sq mi), it had a population density of 128.8/km^{2} (333.5/sq mi) in 2016.

== See also ==
- List of communities in Alberta
- List of hamlets in Alberta
