= Delacour, Alberta =

Delacour
- Hamlet
- Location of Delacour Delacour (Canada)
- Coordinates: 51°09′06″N 113°46′24″W
- Country: Canada
- Province: Alberta
- Region: Calgary Metropolitan Region
- Census division: 6
- Municipal district: Rocky View County

Government
  - Type: Unincorporated
  - Governing body: Rocky View County Council

Area (2021)
  - Land: 0.17 km^{2} (0.066 sq mi)

Population (2021)
  - Total: 5
  - Density: 28.9/km^{2} (75/sq mi)
- Time zone: UTC−06:00 (Alberta Time)
- Area codes: 403, 587, 825

Delacour (/ˈdɛləkʊər/) is a hamlet in southern Alberta under the jurisdiction of Rocky View County. It is located approximately 10 km (6.2 mi) east of the City of Calgary, and 24 km (15 mi) from its downtown. The hamlet features a creek valley setting and a golf club.

== History ==
The Delacour station was named after the foreman of the Grand Trunk Pacific Railway construction crew. The line became part of the Canadian National Railway in 1914. It was previously believed that Delacour was a French name meaning "of the heart". It has been revealed that Mr. Delacour was from Denmark. The first passenger train went through February 28, 1914. A small store was established in the community in 1914. The post office was in operation since November 15, 1915.

== Demographics ==
In the 2021 Census of Population conducted by Statistics Canada, Delacour had a population of 5 living in 1 of its 1 total private dwellings, a change of −50% from its 2016 population of 10. With a land area of 0.17 km^{2} (0.066 sq mi), it had a population density of 29.4/km^{2} (76.2/sq mi) in 2021.

The population of Delacour according to the 2018 municipal census conducted by Rocky View County is 10.

== See also ==
- List of communities in Alberta
- List of hamlets in Alberta
