= Madden, Alberta =

Madden
- Hamlet
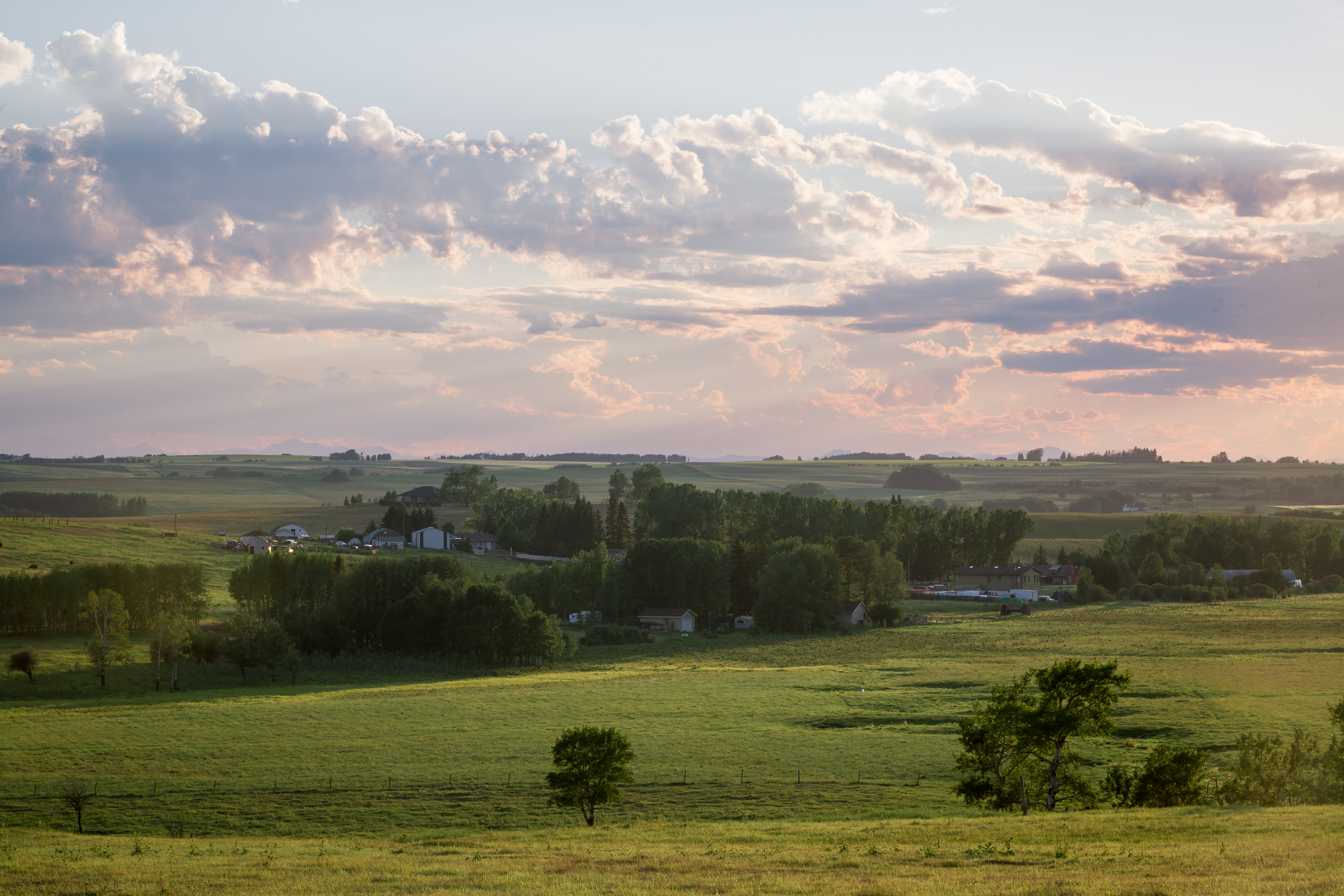
- Sunset over Madden (July 2018)

- Location of Madden in Alberta
- Coordinates: 51°43′29″N 114°28′29″W
- Country: Canada
- Province: Alberta
- Region: Calgary Region
- Established: 1876

Area (2021)
  - Land: 0.07 km^{2} (0.027 sq mi)

Population (2021)
  - Total: 10
  - Density: 144.1/km^{2} (373/sq mi)
- Time zone: UTC−06:00 (Alberta Time)

Madden is a hamlet in southern Alberta, Canada, under the jurisdiction of Rocky View County.

Madden is located approximately 46 kilometres (29 mi) north of Downtown Calgary on Highway 574, 16 kilometres (9.9 mi) west of the Town of Crossfield on Highway 2A and 19 kilometres (12 mi) west of Highway 2 (the Calgary-Edmonton Corridor).

The hamlet was named after Bernard Madden, an early pioneer and a prominent rancher who arrived in the area in 1876. The post office was opened on May 1, 1931.

Madden has a community hall and curling rink, meat processor campground, fire station and an 18-hole golf course. Madden has also been host to a few film crews, including the 2008 production Mayerthorpe (seen on CTV), which was shot at various locations near the hamlet.

Madden was once located on a Canadian Pacific Railway spur from Collicutt to Cremona and had two elevators. The rail grade can still be seen as it goes behind the Madden Ice Cream Store (the old Dodd's General Store) west from the hamlet through the Ag Society grounds and east towards Nier Lakes.

== Climate ==
Climate data for Madden
Month	Jan	Feb	Mar	Apr	May	Jun	Jul	Aug	Sep	Oct	Nov	Dec	Year
Record high °C (°F)	14.5 (58.1)	22.8 (73.0)	21 (70)	29.5 (85.1)	32.5 (90.5)	33.5 (92.3)	34 (93)	34 (93)	33 (91)	28 (82)	19.5 (67.1)	18.5 (65.3)	34 (93)
Mean daily maximum °C (°F)	−1.8 (28.8)	0.5 (32.9)	4.1 (39.4)	11.1 (52.0)	16.3 (61.3)	19.6 (67.3)	21.8 (71.2)	21.9 (71.4)	17 (63)	11.8 (53.2)	2.1 (35.8)	−1.1 (30.0)	10.3 (50.5)
Daily mean °C (°F)	−7.8 (18.0)	−5.6 (21.9)	−1.8 (28.8)	4.4 (39.9)	9.5 (49.1)	13.1 (55.6)	15 (59)	14.8 (58.6)	10.2 (50.4)	5.1 (41.2)	−3.5 (25.7)	−6.8 (19.8)	3.9 (39.0)
Mean daily minimum °C (°F)	−13.8 (7.2)	−11.7 (10.9)	−7.7 (18.1)	−2.4 (27.7)	2.5 (36.5)	6.6 (43.9)	8.3 (46.9)	7.7 (45.9)	3.3 (37.9)	−1.6 (29.1)	−9 (16)	−12.4 (9.7)	−2.5 (27.5)
Record low °C (°F)	−39.5 (−39.1)	−38.5 (−37.3)	−31.5 (−24.7)	−19.5 (−3.1)	−9 (16)	−2.5 (27.5)	−0.5 (31.1)	−4 (25)	−9.5 (14.9)	−27 (−17)	−35.5 (−31.9)	−38.5 (−37.3)	−39.5 (−39.1)
Average precipitation mm (inches)	16 (0.6)	11.4 (0.45)	21 (0.8)	28.4 (1.12)	63.1 (2.48)	82.5 (3.25)	75.1 (2.96)	65.4 (2.57)	53.7 (2.11)	17.3 (0.68)	17.6 (0.69)	15 (0.6)	466.5 (18.37)
Source: Environment Canada

== Demographics ==
In the 2021 Census of Population conducted by Statistics Canada, Madden had a population of 10 living in 6 of its 10 total private dwellings, a change of −64.3% from its 2016 population of 28. With a land area of 0.07 km^{2} (0.027 sq mi), it had a population density of 142.9/km^{2} (370.0/sq mi) in 2021.

population of Madden according to the 2018 municipal census conducted by Rocky View County is 26, an increase from its 2013 municipal census population count of 21.

== See also ==
- List of communities in Alberta
- List of hamlets in Alberta
