= Demographics of Calgary =

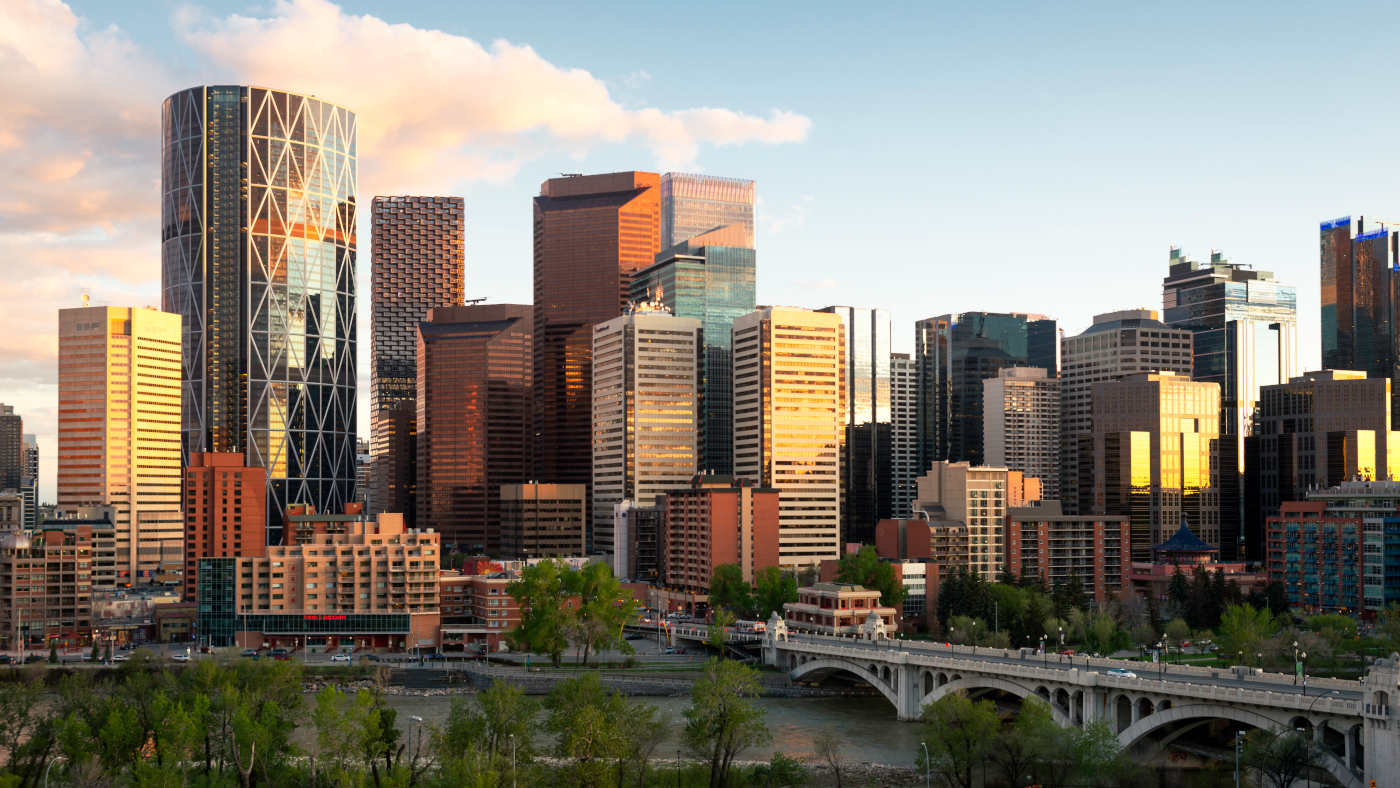
Downtown Calgary

Federal census population history
Year	Pop.	±%
1891	3,876	—
1901	4,091	+5.5%
1906	11,967	+192.5%
1911	43,704	+265.2%
1916	56,514	+29.3%
1921	63,305	+12.0%
1926	65,291	+3.1%
1931	83,761	+28.3%
1936	83,407	−0.4%
1941	88,904	+6.6%
1946	100,044	+12.5%
1951	129,060	+29.0%
1956	181,780	+40.8%
1961	249,641	+37.3%
1966	330,575	+32.4%
1971	403,319	+22.0%
1976	469,917	+16.5%
1981	592,743	+26.1%
1986	636,107	+7.3%
1991	710,795	+11.7%
1996	768,082	+8.1%
2001	878,866	+14.4%
2006	988,193	+12.4%
2011	1,096,833	+11.0%
2016	1,239,220	+13.0%
2021	1,306,784	+5.5%
Source: Statistics Canada

In the 2021 Census, the City of Calgary had a population of 1,306,784 residents, representing 30.7% of the 4,262,635 residents in all of Alberta, and 3.5% compared to a population of 36,991,981 in all of Canada. The total population of the Calgary census metropolitan area (CMA) was 1,481,806. Calgary is the largest city in Alberta, and the third-largest municipality, and fifth-largest metropolitan area in Canada, as of 2021.

== Civic census ==
Section 57 of Alberta's Municipal Government Act (MGA) enables municipalities to conduct censuses. The City of Calgary first conducted a municipal census, or civic census, in 1931. It has conducted a civic census annually since 1958.

Calgary's 2016 civic census counted a population of 1,381,345. From 2011 to 2012, there was a 2.7% increase over its 2011 municipal census population of 1,090,936. The city attributed the 29,289 increase in residents to a natural increase of 9,631 and a net migration of 19,658 since the 2011 civic census. The 2012 civic census also recorded a total 459,339 dwellings in the city.

=== 2012 population breakdown ===
The following is a breakdown of the City of Calgary's 2012 civic census results by community, including residential communities, industrial areas, major parks and residual areas by electoral ward.

Neighbourhoods of Calgary
Name	Quadrant	Sector	Ward 2021	Type	Founded	Population (2021)	Population (2011)	Dwellings (2012)	Area (km^{2})	Population density	Notes
Abbeydale	NE/SE	Northeast	10	Residential	1976	5925	5,700	2,023	1.7	3,480.6	Very small section falls into the SE
Acadia	SE	South	11	Residential	1960	9915	10,615	5,053	3.9	2,744.9	
Albert Park/Radisson Heights	SE	East	9	Residential	1910	6740	6,217	2,709	2.5	2,493.6	Commonly confused with Forest Lawn
Altadore	SW	Centre	8	Residential	1945	7290	8,907	4,486	2.9	3,143.4	
Alpine Park	SW		13								
Alyth/Bonnybrook	SE	Centre	9	Industrial		0	17	14	3.8	4.2	
Applewood Park	SE/NE	East	9	Residential	1982	6830	6,404	2,215	1.6	4,061.3	
Arbour Lake	NW	Northwest	2	Residential	1992	10335	10,762	3,918	4.4	2,462.7	Sometimes referred to as Crowfoot
Aspen Woods	SW	West	6	Residential	2001	9435	4,469	2,281	3.8	1,387.1	
Auburn Bay	SE	Southeast	12	Residential	2005	18090	5,769	2,808	4.5	1,598.4	
Aurora Business Park	NE	North		Industrial			0	0	2.4	0	
Banff Trail	NW	Centre	7	Residential	1952	3805	3,582	1,950	1.5	2,558	
Bankview	SW	Centre	8	Residential	1908	5125	4,754	3,528	0.7	7,458.6	
Bayview	SW	South	11	Residential		675	648	249	0.4	1,705	
Beddington Heights	NW/NE	North	4	Residential		11295	11,457	4,348	3.2	3,620.3	
Bel-Aire	SW	Centre	11	Residential	1960	400	449	159	0.3	1,413.3	
Belmont			13			800					
Beltline	SW/SE	Centre	8	Residential		25880	19,556	14,456	2.9	6,786.6	Created as a merger between the neighborhoods of Connaught and Victoria Park
Belvedere	SE	East	9		2013						Sometimes referred to as East Hills
Bonavista Downs	SE	South		Residential	1973	830	947	370	0.5	1,850	
Bowness	NW	Northwest	1	Residential	1896	10770	10,700	5,313	5.6	1,966.4	
Braeside	SW	South	11	Residential	1965	5700	5,978	2,544	2	2,970	
Brentwood	NW	Northwest	2	Residential	1960	7410	6,049	2,595	2.9	2,089.3	
Bridgeland/Riverside	NE/SE	Centre	9	Residential	1908	6350	5,254	3,274	3.1	1,804.5	
Bridlewood	SW	South	13	Residential	1997	12545	11,641	4,200	3.2	3,698.4	
Britannia	SW	Centre	8	Residential	1956	765	746	309	0.5	1,606	
Burns Industrial	SE	Centre		Industrial			11	2	2.9	0	
Calgary International Airport	NE	Northeast	5	Industrial			0	4	20.6	0	
Cambrian Heights	NW	Centre	4	Residential		2000	2,039	930	0.9	2,287.8	
Canada Olympic Park	SW	West	6	Major Park			0	0	0.9	0	
Canyon Meadows	SW	South		Residential	1965	7435	7,895	3,195	3.1	2,511.9	
Capitol Hill	NW	Centre	7	Residential	1948	4670	4,003	2,291	1.4	2,867.9	
Carrington	NW	North		Residential		2750					
Castleridge	NE	Northeast	5	Residential	1980	6130	6,098	1,954	1.2	5,080	
Cedarbrae	SW	South	11	Residential	1973	5935	6,264	2,609	2.1	2,970	
Chaparral	SE	South		Residential	1995	12500	11,151	3,759	5.4	2,139.3	
Charleswood	NW	Northwest	4	Residential	1959	3595	3,357	1,494	1.8	1,900.6	
Chinatown	SW/SE	Centre	7	Residential		2250	1,269	1,381	0.179	7,885	
Chinook Park	SW	South	11	Residential	1959	1535	1,703	589	0.6	2,845	
Christie Park	SW	West	6	Residential	1993	1880	2,180	728	0.8	2,745	
Citadel	NW	Northwest		Residential		10180	10,171	3,479	2.7	3,776.7	
Cityscape	NE	Northeast	5	Residential		5085					
Cliff Bungalow	SW	Centre	8	Residential		1805	1,912	1,377	0.243	4,840	
Coach Hill	SW	West	6	Residential		3275	3,194	1,480	1.1	2,980.9	
Collingwood	NW	Northwest	4	Residential		2290	2,231	978	1.6	1,388.8	
Copperfield	SE	Southeast		Residential		14095	7,162	3,043	4.4	1,780.5	
Coral Springs	NE	Northeast	10	Residential		5610	5,838	1,508	1.8	3,260	
Cougar Ridge	SW	West	6	Residential		7150	5,813	1,908	2.2	2,670	
Country Hills	NW	North	3	Residential		3660	3,720	1,426	1.9	1,962.1	
Country Hills Village	NE	North	3	Residential		2480	2,342	1,467	1	2,615	Sometimes referred to as North Pointe
Coventry Hills	NE	North	3	Residential		17350	15,722	5,322	4.1	3,894.9	
Cranston	SE	Southeast		Residential	2000	20850	10,831	4,625	8.3	1,428.6	
Crescent Heights	NE/NW	Centre	7	Residential		6240	5,895	3,614	1.6	3,919.4	
Crestmont	SW	West		Residential		2275	1,430	462	0.6	2,423.3	
Currie	SW	West		Residential		1275	24	76	1.1	156.4	
Dalhousie	NW	Northwest	4	Residential		8530	8,917	3,739	3.3	2,753	
Deer Ridge	SE	South		Residential		3795	3,991	1,501	1.4	2,917.1	
Deer Run	SE	South		Residential		4910	5,390	2,113	1.9	2,811.1	
Deerfoot Business Centre	NE	Northeast		Industrial			0	0	2	0	
Diamond Cove	SE	South		Residential		625	716	271	0.5	1,398	
Discovery Ridge	SW	West	6	Residential		4330	4,321	1,649	3.6	1,208.3	
Douglasdale/Glen	SE	Southeast		Residential		12920	11,768	4,217	6.4	1,857.8	
Dover	SE	East		Residential		10795	10,302	4,722	4.2	2,493.8	
Downtown Commercial Core	SW/SE	Centre		Residential		8225	8,071	5,121	1.3	6,165.4	
Downtown East Village	SE	Centre		Residential		3140	2,747	1,230	0.5	5,564	Sometimes referred to as the East Village
Downtown West End	SW	Centre		Residential		2825	2,483	1,628	0.4	5,805	
Eagle Ridge	SW	South	11	Residential		260	443	110	0.4	1,037.5	
East Fairview Industrial	SE	South		Industrial			0	1	2.3	0	
East Shepard Industrial	SE	Southeast		Industrial			0	0	17.4	0	
Eastfield	SE	East		Industrial			0	0	1.1	0	
Eau Claire	SW	Centre	7	Residential	1885	1875	1,711	1,328	0.5	3,702	
Edgemont	NW	Northwest	4	Residential		15225	16,082	5,421	6.6	2,408.8	
Elbow Park	SW	Centre	8	Residential		3285	3,408	1,221	1.8	1,876.1	
Elboya	SW	Centre	8	Residential		1835	1,747	783	0.7	2,445.7	
Erin Woods	SE	East		Residential		6790	6,794	2,453	1.6	4,313.1	
Erlton	SW/SE	Centre		Residential		1280	1,231	742	0.5	2,468	
Evanston	NW	North		Residential		18710	5,889	2,576	4.9	1,345.7	
Evergreen	SW	South		Residential		20780	19,487	6,961	4.6	4,371.7	
Fairview	SE	South		Residential		3675	3,552	1,606	1.3	2,786.9	
Fairview Industrial	SE	South		Industrial			0	2	1.3	0	
Falconridge	NE	Northeast	5	Residential		10325	10,043	3,478	2.2	4,718.6	
Fish Creek Park	SE/SW	South	12/13/14	Major Park		430	0	0	15.6	0	
Foothills Industrial	SE	East		Industrial			326	2	7.6	39.2	
Forest Heights	SE	East	9	Residential		5985	6,185	2,221	1.5	4,141.3	Commonly confused with Forest Lawn
Forest Lawn	SE	East	9	Residential		7230	7,313	3,352	2.3	3,255.2	
Forest Lawn Industrial	SE	East	9	Industrial			120	63	1.5	86.7	Sometimes referred to as Hubalta
Franklin	NE/SE	Northeast	10	Industrial			0	3	1.5	0	
Garrison Green	SW	West	11	Residential		1680	6,242	2,988	2	3,188	Formerly a part of Lincoln Park
Garrison Woods	SW	West	8			2860					Formerly a part of Altadore
Glacier Ridge	NW										
Glamorgan	SW	West	6	Residential		6575	6,242	2,988	2	3,188	
Glenbrook	SW	West	6	Residential		7240	6,893	3,247	1.9	3,713.7	
Glendale	SW	West	6	Residential		2715	2,730	1,111	1.4	1,963.6	
Glendeer Business Park	SE	South		Industrial			0	0	0.3	0	
Glenmore Park	SW	West		Major Park			0	3	10.2	0	
Golden Triangle	SE	East		Industrial			0	1	0.5	0	
Great Plains	SE	East		Industrial			0	0	4.3	0	
Greenview	NE	North		Residential		2100	1,956	1,120	0.5	3,950	
Greenview Industrial Park	NE	North		Industrial			0	5	2.1	0	
Greenwood/Greenbriar	NW	Northwest		Residential			932	501	1.2	788.3	
Hamptons	NW	Northwest		Residential		7360	7,843	2,471	3.5	2,258.6	
Harvest Hills	NE	North	3	Residential		7805	7,485	2,569	2.2	3,364.5	
Hawkwood	NW	Northwest		Residential		9115	9,898	3,331	3.2	3,072.2	
Haysboro	SW	South	11	Residential		6960	6,724	3,637	2.7	2,571.5	
Hidden Valley	NW	North		Residential		11540	11,657	3,867	4.3	2,744	
Highfield	SE	Centre	9	Industrial			0	0	2.7	0	
Highland Park	NW/NE	Centre		Residential		4105	3,539	2,123	1.4	2,708.6	
Highwood	NW	Centre		Residential		2205	2,098	993	0.9	2,460	
Hillhurst	NW	Centre		Residential		5475	5,914	3,557	2.1	2,995.7	
Horizon	NE	Northeast	10	Industrial			74	4	2.3	13.5	Commonly referred to as Whitehorn
Hotchkiss	SE	Northeast		Residential							
Hounsfield Heights/Briar Hill	NW	Centre		Residential		2470	2,927	1,109	1.2	2,461.7	Sometimes referred to as North Hill
Huntington Hills	NW/NE	North		Residential		13120	13,279	5,580	4.8	2,752.7	
Huxley			9								
Inglewood	SE	Centre		Residential		4130	3,473	2,241	2.5	1,425.6	
Kelvin Grove	SW	South		Residential		1805	2,334	903	0.8	2,928.8	
Keystone Hills			3								
Killarney/Glengarry	SW	Centre		Residential		7920	6,543	3,679	1.8	3,786.7	
Kincora	NW	North		Residential		7030	4,625	1,548	2.3	2,120	
Kingsland	SW	South		Residential		4900	4,418	2,383	1.3	3,471.5	
Lake Bonavista	SE	South		Residential		10145	10,610	4,106	5.2	2,014.4	
Lakeview	SW	West		Residential		5640	5,501	2,338	2.2	2,485.5	
Legacy	SE	South		Residential		8000	11	0	6.1	0	Located within Calgary City Council's Ward 14; home to All Saints High School, with a student population capacity of 1,500.
Lincoln Park	SW	West		Residential		1590	2,501	1,413	1.5	1,670	
Livingston	NW/NE	North	3	Residential	2017	3985			4.85		Ongoing development, estimated population of 30k when complete.
Lower Mount Royal	SW	Centre		Residential		2990	2,981	2,266	0.3	10,600	
MacEwan Glen	NW	North		Residential		4740	5,138	1,781	1.4	3,642.9	
Mahogany	SE	Southeast		Residential		13860	788	572	6.4	197.8	
Manchester	SE/SW	Centre		Residential		950	669	448	0.5	1,236	
Manchester Industrial	SE/SW	Centre		Industrial		0	0	3	4.6	0	Not to be confused with Manchester
Maple Ridge	SE	South		Residential		1830	1,978	811	2.8	682.1	
Marlborough	NE	Northeast	10	Residential		8910	8,310	3,123	2.7	3,123.7	
Marlborough Park	NE	Northeast	10	Residential		8290	8,278	3,050	2.5	3,356.4	
Martindale	NE	Northeast	5	Residential		14540	12,987	3,912	2.7	5,064.4	
Mayfair	SW	Centre		Residential		410	470	156	0.3	1,603.3	
Mayland	SE/NE	Northeast	10	Industrial		0	0	1	1.2	0	
Mayland Heights	NE	Northeast	10	Residential		5925	5,835	2,787	2	2,916.5	
McCall	NE	Northeast	10	Industrial		0	0	0	2.4	0	
McKenzie Lake	SE	Southeast		Residential		13290	14,062	4,653	5.1	2,754.9	
McKenzie Towne	SE	Southeast		Residential		17505	15,395	6,783	4.8	3,354.6	
Meadowlark Park	SW	Centre		Residential		610	605	277	0.6	1,038.3	
Meridian	NE/SE	Northeast	10	Industrial		0	0	0	1.4	0	
Midnapore	SE	South		Residential		6480	6,888	2,726	2.9	2,365.9	
Millrise	SW/SE	South		Residential		6655	6,717	2,635	1.8	3,828.9	
Mission	SW/SE	Centre		Residential		4505	4,363	3,177	0.5	8,650	
Monterey Park	NE	Northeast	10	Residential		10475	10,460	3,164	3.4	3,079.4	
Mount Pleasant	NW	Centre		Residential		6325	4,718	2,654	1.9	2,553.2	
Montgomery	NW	Northwest	7	Residential	*1956(1911)	4175	3,686	1,839	3	1,286.7	
New Brighton	SE	Southeast		Residential		12885	7,314	3,247	2.9	2,863.1	
Nolan Hill	NW	North		Residential		8755	0	23	2.1	0	
North Airways	NE	Northeast	10	Industrial		0	20	3	1.2	0	
North Glenmore Park	SW	West		Residential		2435	2,388	1,020	1.2	1,988.3	
North Haven	NW	North	5	Residential		2365	2,282	988	0.8	2,860	
North Haven Upper	NW	North	4	Residential		640	615	246	0.229	2,073.3	
Nose Hill Park	NW	Northwest	4	Major Park		0	0	0	11.6	0	
Oakridge	SW	South		Residential		5620	5,719	2,291	2.4	2,354.6	
Ogden	SE	Southeast		Residential		8315	8,432	3,879	4.1	2,122.4	
Ogden Shops	SE	East		Industrial		0	0	0	2.2	0	
Osprey Hill			1								
Palliser	SW	South		Residential		3285	3,301	1,707	1	3,293	
Panorama Hills	NW	North	3	Residential		25535	19,851	7,398	6.3	3,531.3	
Parkdale	NW	Centre		Residential		2300	2,317	1,020	1.1	2,087.3	
Parkhill	SW	Centre		Residential		1770	1,623	849	0.7	2,274.3	
Parkland	SE	South		Residential		3430	3,772	1,448	1.8	2,102.8	
Patterson	SW	West		Residential		4145	4,162	2,008	2	2,140.5	
Pegasus	NE	Northeast	5	Industrial		0	0	2	0.3	0	
Penbrooke Meadows	SE	East		Residential		8235	8,188	3,212	2	4,273.5	Commonly confused with Forest Lawn
Pine Creek						245					Commonly referred as Creekside
Pineridge	NE	Northeast	10	Residential	1974	9850	9,626	3,799	2.6	3,709.2	
Point Mckay	NW	Centre		Residential		1330	1,318	846	0.4	3,295	
Pump Hill	SW	South		Residential		1455	1,655	563	0.9	1,793.3	
Queens Park Village	NW	Centre		Residential		375	400	188	0.6	691.7	
Queensland	SE	South		Residential		4585	4,877	1,894	1.6	2,981.9	
Ramsay	SE	Centre		Residential		2155	2,006	1,132	1	2,110	
Ranchlands	NW	Northwest		Residential		7490	7,529	3,051	2.3	3,315.7	
Rangeview	SE										
Rangeview Springs	SE	Southeast									
Red Carpet	SE	East	9	Residential		1745	1,630	917	0.6	2,591.7	
Redstone	NE	Northeast	5	Residential		9050	0	0	1.9	0	
Renfrew	NE	Centre		Residential		6580	5,669	3,231	2.7	2,165.2	
Residual Ward 1	NW/SW	West/ Northwest		Residual Area			343	110	n/a	—	
Residual Ward 2	NW	North/ Northwest		Residual Area			1,140	25	n/a	—	
Residual Ward 3	NE/NW	North/ Northeast		Residual Area			109	31	n/a	—	
Residual Ward 4				Residual Area			4	0	n/a	—	
Residual Ward 5	NE	Northeast		Residual Area			28	11	n/a	—	
Residual Ward 6	SW	West		Residual Area			36	13	n/a	—	
Residual Ward 7				Residual Area			0	0	n/a	—	
Residual Ward 8				Residual Area			0	0	n/a	—	
Residual Ward 9	SE	East/ Southeast		Residual Area			40	7	n/a	—	
Residual Ward 10	SE/NE	East		Residual Area			827	378	n/a	—	
Residual Ward 11				Residual Area			6	0	n/a	—	
Residual Ward 12	SE	Southeast		Residual Area			327	135	n/a	—	
Residual Ward 13	SW	South		Residual Area			60	36	n/a	—	
Residual Ward 14	SE/SW	South		Residual Area			58	27	n/a	—	
Richmond	SW	Centre		Residential		5250	4,113	2,259	1.8	2,349.4	
Rideau Park	SW	Centre		Residential		675	627	342	0.3	2,120	
Riverbend	SE	Southeast		Residential		9205	9,749	3,449	4.1	2,362	
Rockland Park	NW	Northwest	1	Residential	2021				1.76		Ongoing development. estimated total population of 9000 across 3100 dwellings.
Rocky Ridge	NW	Northwest		Residential		8195	7,266	2,972	2.8	2,736.4	
Rosedale	NW	Centre		Residential		1495	1,592	636	0.7	2,241.4	
Rosemont	NW	Centre		Residential		1155	1,208	563	0.5	2,482	
Rosscarrock	SW	West		Residential		3490	3,175	1,645	1.1	3,050.9	Sometimes referred to as Westbrook
Roxboro	SW	Centre		Residential		415	441	161	0.231	1,403.3	
Royal Oak	NW	Northwest		Residential		11580	10,979	3,940	3.6	3,125.6	
Royal Vista	NW	Northwest		Industrial		0	0	0	1.3	0	
Rundle	NE	Northeast	10	Residential	1973	10545	11,029	3,836	2.6	4,330	
Rutland Park	SW	West		Residential		2140	2,309	972	0.7	3,181.4	
Saddle Ridge	NE	Northeast	5	Residential	1960	24365	13,388	3,668	5.5	2,613.1	Sometimes referred to as Saddletowne
Saddle Ridge Industrial	NE	Northeast	5	Industrial		0	60	24	2.5	14	
Sage Hill	NW	North		Residential		9345	1,425	992	3.8	576.1	
Sandstone Valley	NW	North		Residential		5795	6,142	2,120	1.8	3,473.9	
Scarboro	SW	Centre		Residential		1010	870	343	0.5	1,760	
Scarboro/Sunalta West	SW	Centre		Residential		465	397	165	0.4	1,025	
Scenic Acres	NW	Northwest		Residential		7850	8,710	2,921	4.3	2,011.6	
Section 23	SE	Southeast		Industrial			0	1	3.1	0	
Seton	SE	Southeast	12	Residential	2018	3590		0	1.7	0	
Seton Ridge	SE	Southeast	12	Residential	2024				0.8		
Shaganappi	SW	Centre		Residential		1765	1,459	862	1.5	1,035.3	
Shawnee Slopes	SW	South		Residential		2020	1,529	866	1.2	1,304.2	
Shawnessy	SW/SE	South		Residential	1981	9055	9,315	3,300	3.7	2,536.5	
Shepard Industrial	SE	Southeast		Residential		265	250	151	4.2	59.8	Sometimes referred to as just Shepard or South Hill
Sherwood	NW	North		Residential		6520	2,109	979	2.4	1,051.3	
Signal Hill	SW	West		Residential		13000	13,795	5,253	5.6	2,484.6	
Silver Springs	NW	Northwest		Residential		8570	8,910	3,533	5	1,786.6	
Silverado	SW/SE	South		Residential		7975	4,337	1,898	5.1	1,007.1	
Skyline East	NE	Northeast		Industrial		0	0	0	0.6	0	
Skyline West	NE	North		Industrial		0	0	0	0.8	0	
Skyview Ranch	NE	Northeast		Residential		12870	1,805	1,306	4.6	650	
Somerset	SW/SE	South		Residential		8320	8,401	3,136	2.3	3,713	
South Airways	NE	Northeast	10	Industrial		0	0	2	1.9	0	
South Calgary	SW	Centre		Residential		4540	3,642	2,244	0.9	4,108.9	
South Foothills	SE	Southeast		Industrial		0	0	3	3.6	0	
Southview	SE	East		Residential		1550	2,063	936	1.6	1,187.5	Commonly confused with Forest Lawn
Southwood	SW	South		Residential		6095	5,965	2,658	2.7	2,253.7	Commonly referred to as Southland
Springbank Hill	SW	West		Residential		9840	8,388	3,166	6.3	1,394.1	
Spruce Cliff	SW	West		Residential		4195	3,992	2,344	1.1	3,895.5	
St. Andrews Heights	NW	Centre		Residential		1345	1,470	645	1.2	1,323.3	
Starfield	SE	East		Industrial		0	0	2	4.3	0	
Starling	NW	Northwest	2	Residential	2024				1.14		
Stonegate Landing	NE	Northeast		Industrial		0	0	0	5.4	0	
Stoney 1	NE	North		Industrial		0	0	5	6.1	0	
Stoney 2	NE	Northeast		Industrial		0	0	1	4	0	
Stoney 3	NE	Northeast		Industrial		0	0	0	1.3	0	
Stoney 4	NE	Northeast		Industrial		0	0	3	5.6	0	
Strathcona Park	SW	West		Residential	1980	6830	7,039	2,436	2.7	2,604.8	
Sunalta	SW	Centre		Residential	1910	3090	3,116	2,130	0.9	3,682.2	
Sundance	SE	South		Residential	1982	9590	10,623	3,406	4	2,624.8	
Sunnyside	NW	Centre		Residential	1904	4000	3,751	2,340	1	3,704	
Sunridge	NE	Northeast	10	Industrial		0	40	7	2.3	14.3	
Symons Valley Ranch	NW	North		Residential					0.137		Smallest neighborhood by land area
Taradale	NE	Northeast	5	Residential	1984	17630	16,110	4,559	2.9	5,807.2	
Temple	NE	Northeast	10	Residential	1977	10525	10,580	3,648	2.6	4,190	
Thorncliffe	NW/NE	North		Residential		8695	8,640	3,858	3.3	2,634.2	
Tuscany	NW	Northwest	1	Residential	1994	19700	18,838	6,492	6.9	2,755.5	
Tuxedo Park	NE/NW	Centre		Residential		5165	4,430	2,686	1.3	3,516.2	
University District	NW	Northwest	7	Residential		960	?	?	?	?	
University Heights	NW	Northwest	7	Residential		2965	2,890	1,380	0.8	3,660	
University of Calgary	NW	Northwest	7	Residential		?	2,355	927	2.7	1,009.3	
Upper Mount Royal	SW	Centre		Residential		2735	2,536	1,071	1.3	1,955.4	
Valley Ridge	NW	West		Residential		5365	5,042	1,768	3.3	1,519.1	
Valleyfield	SE	East		Industrial		0	0	6	1.2	0	
Varsity	NW	Northwest		Residential		12040	12,021	5,547	6.8	1,794.1	
Vermilion Hills											
Vista Heights	NE	Northeast		Residential		2300	2,274	844	1.1	2,003.6	
Walden	SE	South		Residential		7650	594	450	2.4	389.6	
West Hillhurst	NW	Centre		Residential		6635	5,757	2,947	2.4	2,417.5	
West Springs	SW	West		Residential		11560	7,849	2,795	4.1	2,006.8	
Westgate	SW	West		Residential		3225	3,101	1,334	1.2	2,643.3	
Westwinds	NE	Northeast	5	Industrial		0	0	0	2	0	
Whitehorn	NE	Northeast	10	Residential		11085	11,541	3,869	2.6	4,558.5	
Wildwood	SW	West		Residential	1956	2765	2,582	1,056	2.6	999.2	
Willow Park	SE	South		Residential		5050	5,308	2,282	3.4	1,537.9	
Windsor Park	SW	Centre		Residential		4410	3,858	2,421	1.3	3,173.8	
Winston Heights/Mountview	NE	Centre		Residential		3605	3,760	1,883	3	1,297	
Wolf Willow	SE	South		Residential		525					
Woodbine	SW	South		Residential	1980	8745	9,086	3,371	3.2	2,853.4	
Woodlands	SW	South		Residential	1976	5830	6,201	2,397	2.8	2,214.6	
Yorkville	SW	South	13	Residential		715				?	
Total City of Calgary							1,090,936	459,339	848.20	1,320.7	

== Growth and density ==
Between 2016 and 2021, the population of the City of Calgary grew by 5.5%, compared with an increase of 7.8% for the Calgary CMA. During the same period, the growth rates were 10.8% for Alberta and 5.9% for Canada. With land areas of 820.62 km^{2} (316.84 sq mi) and 5,098.68 km^{2} (1,968.61 sq mi) for the city and CMA respectively, the population density was 1,592.435/km^{2} (4,124.388/sq mi) for the city and 290.6254/km^{2} (752.7164/sq mi) for the CMA in 2021.

== Age and gender ==
In the 2011 census, the median age was 36.4 years for both the City of Calgary and its CMA. Comparatively, the median ages were 36.5 years in Alberta and 40.6 years in Canada. The largest age group was 25 to 29 years for both the city (93,360) and the CMA (100,290).

The 2011 census also indicated that 50.09% of the population was female and 49.91% was male in the city (549,360 females and 547,475 males) and 50.05% and 49.95% in the CMA (607,970 females and 606,870 males).

== Ethnicity ==
=== Metro Calgary ===
Largest ethnic origin in Calgary CMA by census tract based on the 2021 census

Population by ethnicity in Calgary CMA, 2016
Ethnic Origin	Population	Percent
English	298,865	21.74%
Canadian	275,950	20.07%
Scottish	240,775	17.52%
German	201,650	14.67%
Irish	197,185	14.34%
French	118,080	8.59%
Chinese	104,620	7.61%
Ukrainian	90,740	6.60%
East Indian	90,620	6.59%
Filipino	75,020	5.46%

Largest panethnic group in Calgary CMA by census tract based on the 2021 census

Panethnic groups in Metro Calgary (2001−2021)
Panethnic group	2021		2016		2011		2006		2001	
Panethnic group	Pop.	%	Pop.	%	Pop.	%	Pop.	%	Pop.	%
European (Note: 2001-2016: Statistic includes all persons that did not make up part of a visible minority or an indigenous identity. 2021: Statistic includes all persons belonging to the non-indigenous and non-visible minority “White” population group.)	849,560	57.98%	869,555	63.26%	828,330	69.08%	805,825	75.29%	756,500	80.2%
South Asian	153,200	10.46%	122,900	8.94%	84,870	7.08%	57,700	5.39%	36,855	3.91%
Southeast Asian (Note: Statistic includes total responses of "Filipino" and "Southeast Asian" under visible minority section on census.)	117,445	8.02%	93,900	6.83%	71,245	5.94%	41,320	3.86%	28,940	3.07%
East Asian (Note: Statistic includes total responses of "Chinese", "Korean", and "Japanese" under visible minority section on census.)	112,825	7.7%	106,240	7.73%	89,345	7.45%	77,885	7.28%	59,585	6.32%
African	75,645	5.16%	54,190	3.94%	32,985	2.75%	21,060	1.97%	13,665	1.45%
Indigenous	48,625	3.32%	41,645	3.03%	33,370	2.78%	26,575	2.48%	21,915	2.32%
Middle Eastern (Note: Statistic includes total responses of "West Asian" and "Arab" under visible minority section on census.)	48,180	3.29%	39,130	2.85%	25,765	2.15%	17,670	1.65%	11,390	1.21%
Latin American	34,390	2.35%	27,710	2.02%	20,595	1.72%	13,410	1.25%	8,605	0.91%
Other/Multiracial (Note: Statistic includes total responses of "Visible minority, n.i.e." and "Multiple visible minorities" under visible minority section on census.)	26,265	1.79%	19,385	1.41%	12,620	1.05%	8,840	0.83%	5,865	0.62%
Total responses	1,465,180	98.88%	1,374,650	98.71%	1,199,125	98.71%	1,070,295	99.16%	943,310	99.15%
Total population	1,481,806	100%	1,392,609	100%	1,214,839	100%	1,079,310	100%	951,395	100%
Note: Totals greater than 100% due to multiple origin responses

==== Future projections ====
Pan−ethnic Origin Projections (2041)
	2041	
	Population	%
European (Note: Statistic includes all persons that did not make up part of a visible minority or an Indigenous identity.)	1,042,500	42.05%
South Asian	395,000	15.93%
Southeast Asian	265,000	10.69%
East Asian	223,000	9%
African	196,000	7.91%
Middle Eastern	135,000	5.45%
Indigenous	90,500	3.65%
Latin American	76,000	3.07%
Other/multiracial	55,000	2.22%
Projected Metro Calgary Population	2,479,000	100%

=== City of Calgary ===
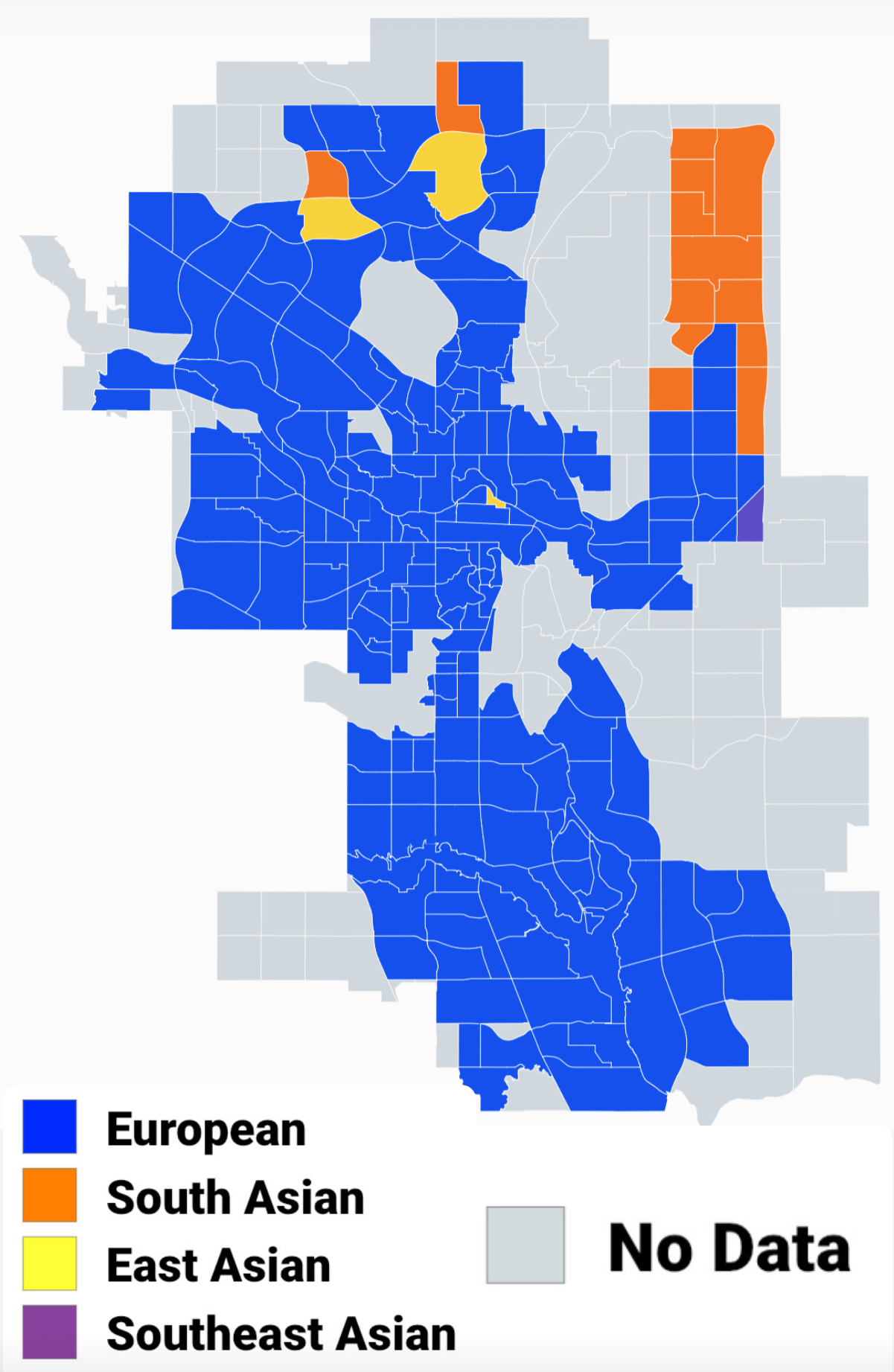
Largest panethnic groups in Calgary by neighbourhood, 2021 census (grey areas are non-residential)

Panethnic groups in the City of Calgary (2001−2021)
Panethnic group	2021		2016		2011		2006		2001	
Panethnic group	Pop.	%	Pop.	%	Pop.	%	Pop.	%	Pop.	%
European (Note: Statistic includes all persons that did not make up part of a visible minority or an indigenous identity.)	715,725	55.41%	744,625	60.91%	727,935	67.26%	722,595	73.77%	688,465	79.03%
South Asian	141,660	10.97%	115,795	9.47%	81,180	7.5%	56,210	5.74%	36,370	4.17%
Southeast Asian	110,610	8.56%	89,260	7.3%	67,880	6.27%	40,325	4.12%	28,605	3.28%
East Asian	109,615	8.49%	103,640	8.48%	87,390	8.07%	76,565	7.82%	59,020	6.78%
African	70,680	5.47%	51,515	4.21%	31,870	2.94%	20,540	2.1%	13,370	1.53%
Middle Eastern	45,885	3.55%	37,800	3.09%	25,215	2.33%	17,175	1.75%	11,300	1.3%
Indigenous	41,350	3.2%	35,195	2.88%	28,905	2.67%	24,425	2.49%	19,765	2.27%
Latin American	31,855	2.47%	26,265	2.15%	19,870	1.84%	13,120	1.34%	8,525	0.98%
Other/Multiracial	24,400	1.89%	18,305	1.5%	11,990	1.11%	8,525	0.87%	5,735	0.66%
Total responses	1,291,770	98.85%	1,222,405	98.64%	1,082,230	98.67%	979,485	99.12%	871,140	99.12%
Total population	1,306,784	100%	1,239,220	100%	1,096,833	100%	988,193	100%	878,866	100%
Note: Totals greater than 100% due to multiple origin responses

== Religion ==
=== City of Calgary ===
Religion in Calgary (2021)
1. Christian (44.5%)
2. No religion (38.7%)
3. Muslim (7.40%)
4. Sikh (3.80%)
5. Hindu (2.60%)
6. Buddhist (1.60%)
7. Jewish (0.50%)
8. Aboriginal Spirituality (0.10%)
9. Other (0.80%)

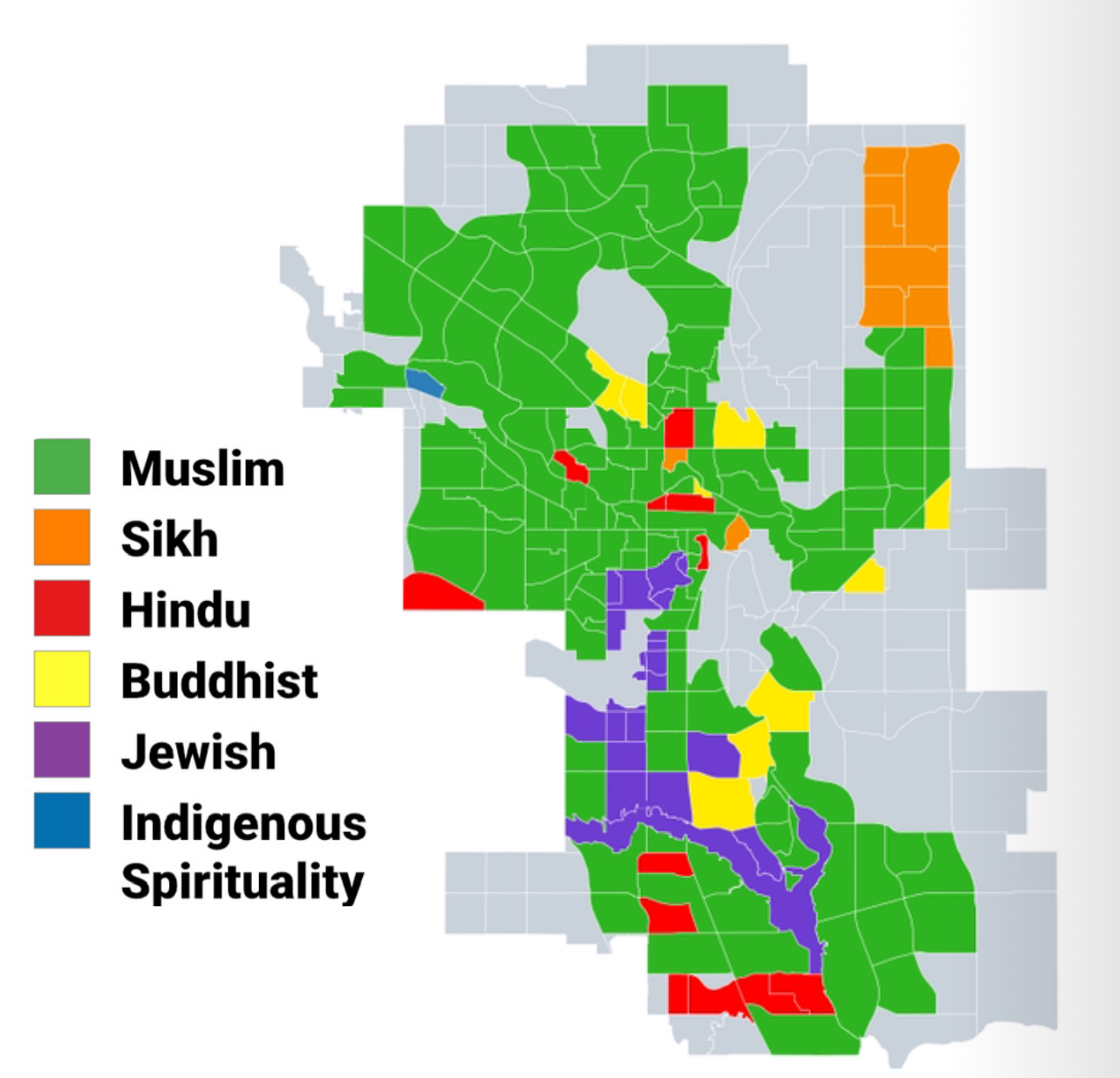
Largest non-Christian religion in Calgary by neighbourhood, 2021 census (grey areas are non-residential)

Religion (2021)	Population	Percent
Christian	575,250	44.5%
No religion	499,375	38.7%
Islam	95,925	7.4%
Sikh	49,465	3.8%
Hindu	33,450	2.6%
Buddhist	20,855	1.6%
Jewish	6,390	0.5%
Aboriginal Spirituality	1,370	0.1%
Other	9,695	0.8%

=== Metro Calgary ===
Largest non-Christian religion in Calgary CMA by census tract based on the 2021 census

Religious groups in Metro Calgary (1981−2021)
Religious group	2021		2011		2001		1991		1981	
Religious group	Pop.	%	Pop.	%	Pop.	%	Pop.	%	Pop.	%
Christianity	656,315	44.79%	667,110	55.63%	632,295	67.03%	541,785	72.41%	482,730	82.23%
Irreligion	576,025	39.31%	388,365	32.39%	237,575	25.19%	165,635	22.14%	81,600	13.9%
Islam	100,825	6.88%	58,310	4.86%	25,920	2.75%	13,895	1.86%	8,390	1.43%
Sikhism	56,055	3.83%	30,420	2.54%	13,325	1.41%	6,075	0.81%	2,505	0.43%
Hinduism	34,920	2.38%	17,835	1.49%	7,260	0.77%	4,155	0.56%	2,710	0.46%
Buddhism	22,125	1.51%	23,260	1.94%	16,635	1.76%	8,870	1.19%	2,170	0.37%
Judaism	6,705	0.46%	6,170	0.51%	6,530	0.69%	5,455	0.73%	5,575	0.95%
Indigenous spirituality	1,480	0.1%	1,195	0.1%	—N/a	—N/a	—N/a	—N/a	—N/a	—N/a
Other	10,730	0.73%	6,465	0.54%	3,775	0.4%	2,340	0.31%	780	0.13%
Total responses	1,465,175	98.88%	1,199,125	98.71%	943,310	99.15%	748,215	99.23%	587,020	99.03%
Total population	1,481,806	100%	1,214,839	100%	951,395	100%	754,033	100%	592,743	100%

== Language ==
=== Knowledge of languages ===
==== Metro Calgary ====
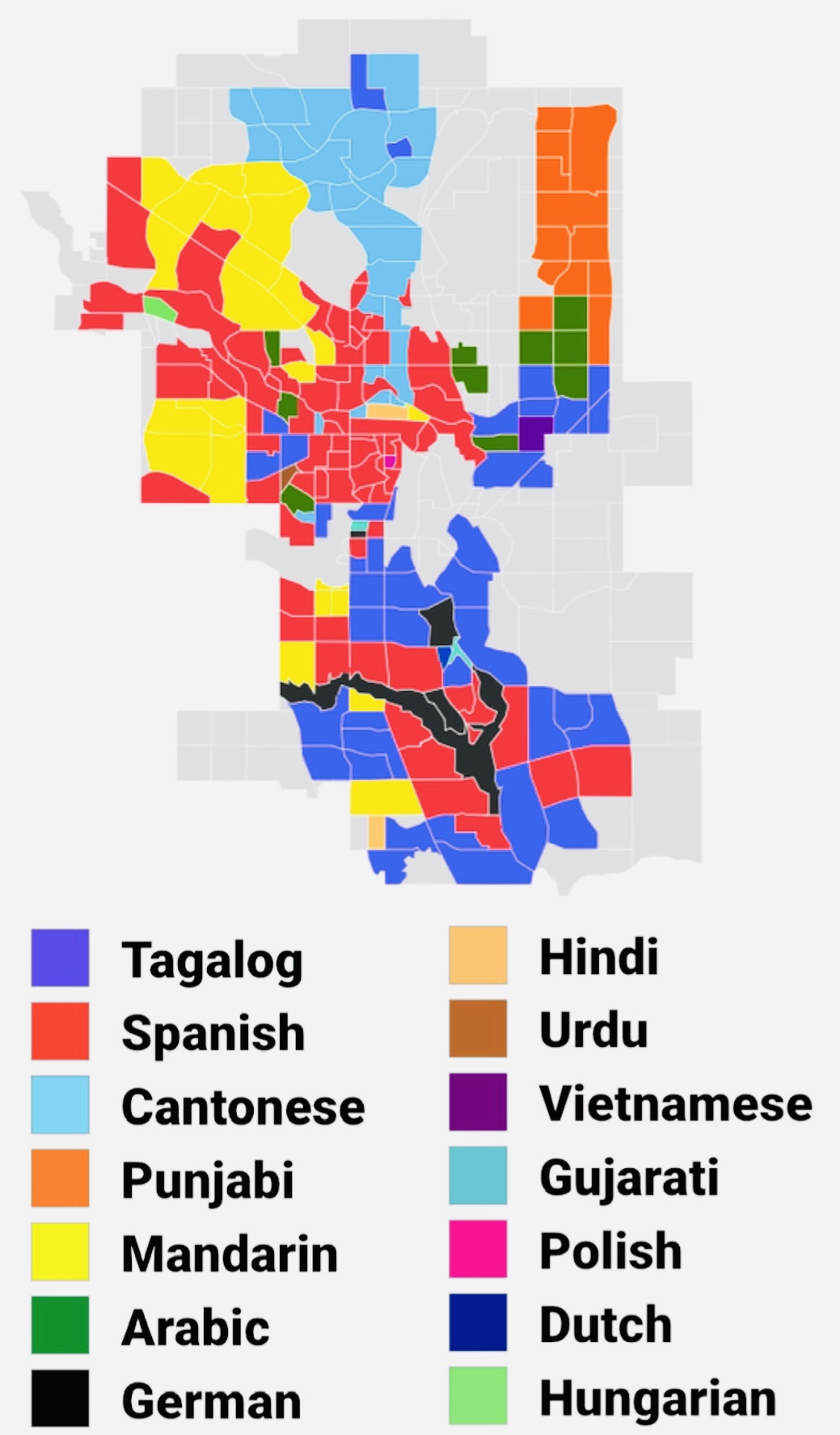
Largest non-official knowledge of language in Calgary by neighbourhoood, 2021 census (grey areas are non-residential)

The question on knowledge of languages allows for multiple responses. The following figures are from the 2021 Canadian Census, and lists languages that were selected by at least 1,000 respondents.

Knowledge of Languages in Metro Calgary
Language	2021	
Language	Pop.	%
English	1,430,255	97.62%
French	98,320	6.71%
Tagalog	70,230	4.79%
Punjabi	68,240	4.66%
Spanish	58,975	4.03%
Mandarin	46,240	3.16%
Cantonese	42,805	2.92%
Hindi	44,965	3.07%
Arabic	34,975	2.39%
Urdu	31,625	2.16%
Vietnamese	19,290	1.32%
German	16,305	1.11%
Russian	15,020	1.03%
Korean	12,225	0.83%
Gujarati	11,115	0.76%
Italian	9,510	0.65%
Polish	9,110	0.62%
Amharic	8,450	0.58%
Tigrinya	7,655	0.52%
Iranian Persian	6,960	0.48%
Portuguese	6,780	0.46%
Serbo-Croatian	6,600	0.45%
Ilocano	6,560	0.45%
Yoruba	6,335	0.43%
Bengali	6,140	0.42%
Romanian	5,875	0.4%
Japanese	5,155	0.35%
Dari	4,760	0.32%
Ukrainian	4,620	0.32%
Dutch	4,540	0.31%
Tamil	4,425	0.3%
Malayalam	3,850	0.26%
Hungarian	3,665	0.25%
Cebuano	3,530	0.24%
Swahili	3,405	0.23%
Igbo	3,030	0.21%
Nepali	2,925	0.2%
Turkish	2,600	0.18%
Somali	2,430	0.17%
Telugu	2,425	0.17%
Min Nan	2,380	0.16%
Greek	2,335	0.16%
Kutchi	2,320	0.16%
Marathi	2,290	0.16%
Czech	2,130	0.15%
Oromo	2,115	0.14%
Afrikaans	2,070	0.14%
Hebrew	2,065	0.14%
Albanian	1,865	0.13%
Slovak	1,440	0.1%
Kurdish	1,420	0.1%
Akan (Twi)	1,395	0.1%
Sinhala	1,380	0.09%
Hiligaynon	1,365	0.09%
Thai	1,300	0.09%
Khmer	1,255	0.09%
Indonesian	1,250	0.09%
Pampangan	1,145	0.08%
Bisaya, n.o.s.	1,115	0.08%
Kannada	1,085	0.07%
Danish	1,075	0.07%
Bulgarian	1,015	0.07%
Total responses	1,465,175	98.88%
Total population	1,481,806	100%

=== Mother tongue ===
==== Metro Calgary ====
Based on Calgary's 2016 metropolitan census reporting a population of 1,381,345, English is the mother tongue for 67.8 per cent of inhabitants. French-speakers make up 1.5 per cent with 20,715 people. Other languages make up 30.7 per cent or 383,320. The top five languages outside English and French in Calgary are Tagalog (Pilipino; Filipino), Punjabi (Panjabi), Cantonese, Mandarin, and Spanish (at 8,685 or 2.1 per cent of Calgary's population).

==== City of Calgary ====
Top 25 languages Calgary, 2016	Population	%
English	806,815	67.8
Tagalog	39,285	3.3
Punjabi	38,840	3.3
Cantonese	33,700	2.8
Mandarin	28,355	2.4
Spanish	27,055	2.3
Arabic	18,390	1.5
French	18,150	1.5
Urdu	16,320	1.4
Vietnamese	12,550	1.1
German	9,895	0.8
Persian	9,525	0.8
Russian	9,255	0.8
Korean	8,880	0.7
Polish	7,680	0.6
Hindi	7,050	0.6
Gujarati	5,390	0.5
Yoruba	5,306	0.5
Italian	5,000	0.4
Romanian	4,495	0.4
Bengali	4,070	0.3
Amharic	4,050	0.3
Dutch	3,435	0.3
Hungarian	3,395	0.3
Portuguese	3,360	0.3
Ukrainian	3,345	0.3

== Immigration ==
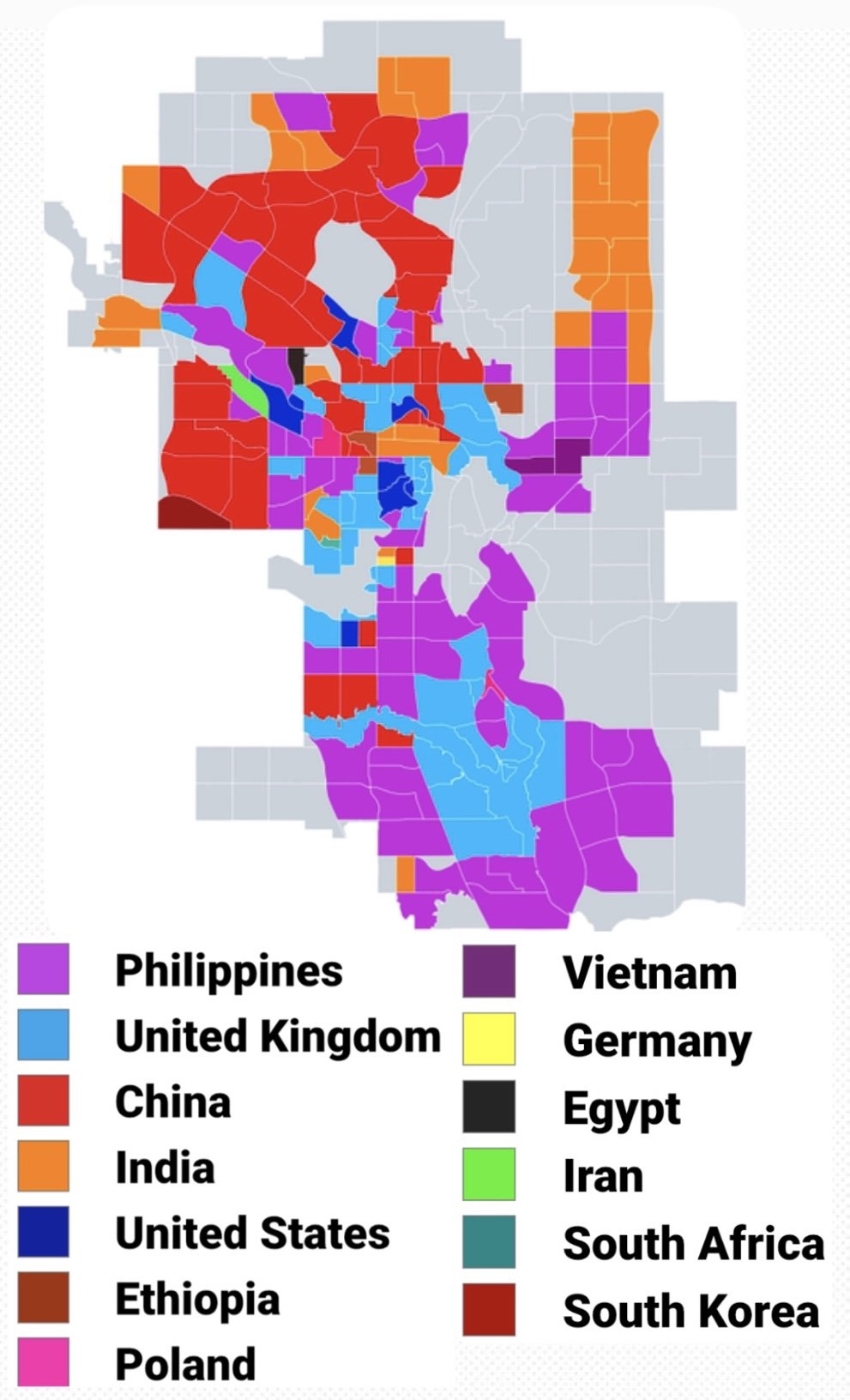
Largest nation of birth of immigrants in Calgary by neighbourhood, 2021 census (grey areas are non-residential)

The 2021 census reported that immigrants (individuals born outside Canada) comprise 460,875 persons or 31.5 percent of the total population of Metro Calgary.

Immigrants in Metro Calgary by country of birth (1986–2021)
Country of birth	2021		2016		2011		2006		2001		1996		1991		1986	
Country of birth	Pop.	%	Pop.	%	Pop.	%	Pop.	%	Pop.	%	Pop.	%	Pop.	%	Pop.	%
Philippines	68,825	14.9%	53,450	13.2%	34,365	10.9%	18,710	7.4%	12,205	6.2%	9,015	5.3%	6,110	4%	4,570	3.3%
India	61,225	13.3%	46,945	11.6%	31,375	10%	21,540	8.5%	12,945	6.6%	8,555	5%	6,455	4.3%	5,525	4%
China	36,785	8%	34,945	8.6%	29,720	9.5%	24,710	9.8%	14,760	7.5%	11,500	6.7%	8,935	5.9%	7,060	5.1%
United Kingdom	24,450	5.3%	26,175	6.5%	25,125	8%	26,060	10.3%	25,415	12.9%	25,930	15.2%	28,075	18.5%	29,695	21.5%
Pakistan	19,375	4.2%	17,740	4.4%	11,575	3.7%	7,870	3.1%	3,440	1.7%	1,845	1.1%	1,240	0.8%	825	0.6%
Vietnam	16,265	3.5%	15,700	3.9%	14,730	4.7%	13,890	5.5%	11,765	6%	10,950	6.4%	9,220	6.1%	6,970	5%
Nigeria	13,340	2.9%	7,690	1.9%	3,560	1.1%	1,150	0.5%	685	0.3%	160	0.1%	220	0.1%	195	0.1%
United States	12,405	2.7%	12,110	3%	12,375	3.9%	11,035	4.4%	10,205	5.2%	9,385	5.5%	9,560	6.3%	11,065	8%
Hong Kong	10,940	2.4%	11,110	2.7%	10,010	3.2%	10,190	4%	10,725	5.4%	10,800	6.3%	7,695	5.1%	5,050	3.7%
South Korea	8,600	1.9%	7,280	1.8%	5,565	1.8%	4,795	1.9%	2,930	1.5%	1,695	1%	1,020	0.7%	1,140	0.8%
Ethiopia	7,160	1.6%	5,230	1.3%	3,540	1.1%	1,855	0.7%	690	0.3%	395	0.2%	465 (Note: Includes Eritrea.)	0.3%	170	0.1%
Poland	6,325	1.4%	6,840	1.7%	6,575	2.1%	6,670	2.6%	6,730	3.4%	6,900	4%	5,855	3.9%	4,515	3.3%
Colombia	6,200	1.3%	5,805	1.4%	4,255	1.4%	1,895	0.7%	610	0.3%	235	0.1%	200	0.1%	85	0.1%
Iran	5,695	1.2%	5,800	1.4%	3,485	1.1%	2,330	0.9%	1,405	0.7%	835	0.5%	860	0.6%	325	0.2%
Germany	5,550	1.2%	6,485	1.6%	6,690	2.1%	7,040	2.8%	7,265	3.7%	7,860	4.6%	7,960	5.2%	8,145	5.9%
Mexico	5,400	1.2%	4,485	1.1%	2,560	0.8%	1,335	0.5%	760	0.4%	445	0.3%	430	0.3%	295	0.2%
Eritrea	4,775	1%	2,270	0.6%	745	0.2%	415	0.2%	390	0.2%	170	0.1%	—N/a (Note: Included with Ethiopia.)	—N/a	—N/a	—N/a
Russia	4,450	1%	4,000	1%	3,450	1.1%	2,585	1%	1,850	0.9%	1,065	0.6%	2,695 (Note: Includes total persons born in all republics of the Soviet Union.)	1.8%	2,605	1.9%
Lebanon	4,420	1%	4,335	1.1%	3,715	1.2%	3,085	1.2%	2,980	1.5%	2,345	1.4%	1,990	1.3%	1,350	1%
Syria	4,415	1%	2,195	0.5%	605	0.2%	570	0.2%	360	0.2%	315	0.2%	255	0.2%	110	0.1%
Total immigrants	460,875	31.5%	404,700	29.4%	313,880	26.2%	252,765	23.6%	197,410	20.9%	170,880	20.9%	151,745	20.3%	138,295	20.8%
Total responses	1,465,180	98.9%	1,374,650	98.7%	1,199,125	98.7%	1,070,295	99.2%	943,310	99.2%	815,985	99.3%	748,215	99.2%	665,845	99.2%
Total population	1,481,806	100%	1,392,609	100%	1,214,839	100%	1,079,310	100%	951,395	100%	821,628	100%	754,033	100%	671,326	100%

=== Recent immigration ===
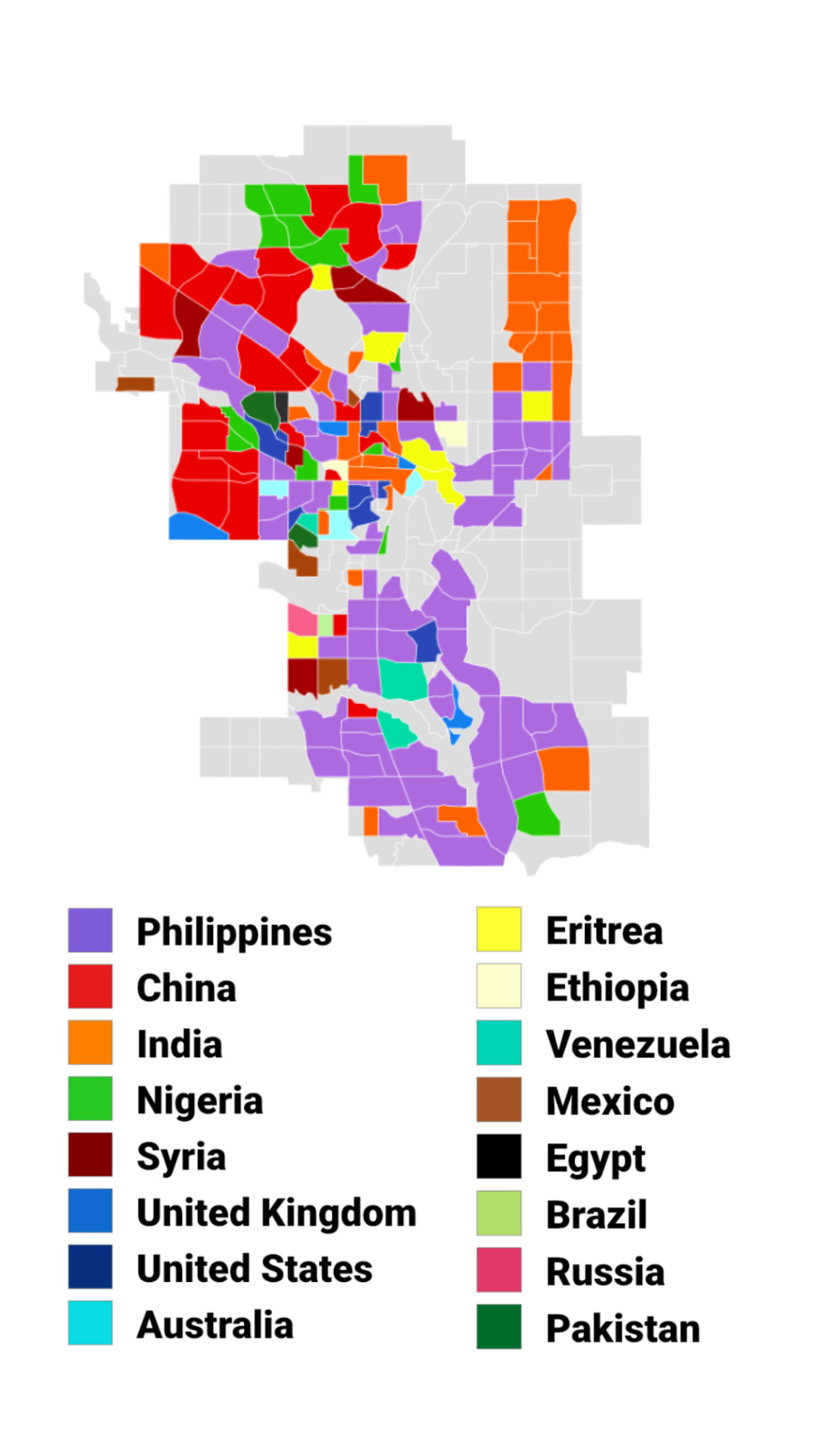
Largest nation of birth of recent immigrants (2016-2021) in Calgary by neighbourhood (grey areas are non-residential or have no recent immigrants)

The 2021 Canadian census counted a total of 85,620 people who immigrated to Metro Calgary between 2016 and 2021.

Recent immigrants to Metro Calgary by Country of birth (2016 to 2021)
Country of Birth	Population	% recent immigrants
Philippines	16,430	19.2%
India	14,755	17.2%
Nigeria	6,170	7.2%
China	5,605	6.5%
Syria	3,095	3.6%
Eritrea	2,545	3%
Pakistan	2,385	2.8%
United States	2,370	2.8%
Ethiopia	1,850	2.2%
South Korea	1,800	2.1%
United Kingdom	1,675	2%
Mexico	1,410	1.6%
Vietnam	960	1.1%
Iraq	945	1.1%
Brazil	900	1.1%
Venezuela	900	1.1%
Afghanistan	870	1%
Iran	865	1%
South Africa	755	0.9%
Ukraine	750	0.9%
Russia	685	0.8%
Colombia	675	0.8%
Bangladesh	640	0.7%
Egypt	610	0.7%
Jamaica	555	0.6%
Total	85,620	100%

== See also ==
- Demographics of Edmonton
- Demographics of Alberta
- List of neighbourhoods in Calgary
