= John Laurie/McKnight Boulevard =

John Laurie Boulevard McKnight Boulevard
- Length: 22.7 km (14.1 mi)
- Location: Calgary, Alberta
- John Laurie Boulevard
- Length: 10.5 km (6.5 mi)
- West end: Arbour Lake Drive / Arbour Lake Road
- Major junctions: Nose Hill Drive; Sarcee Trail; Shaganappi Trail; 14 Street NW
- East end: 48 Avenue NW / McKnight Boulevard
- McKnight Boulevard
- Former name: 48 Avenue N
- Length: 12.2 km (7.6 mi)
- West end: 48 Avenue NW / John Laurie Boulevard
- Major junctions: Centre Street N Edmonton Trail; Deerfoot Trail (Highway 2); Barlow Trail; Métis Trail / 36 Street NE; 52 Street NE; Stoney Trail (Highway 201)
- East end: Calgary City Limits

John Laurie Boulevard / McKnight Boulevard is a major east-west arterial road and expressway in north Calgary, Alberta. The two roadways function together as a major crosstown route between the northwest and northeast quadrants and are part of Calgary's Skeletal Road Network. It is named after William McKnight, a prominent pilot who served in World War Two.

== Route description ==
=== John Laurie Boulevard ===
John Laurie Boulevard begins from the community of Arbour Lake as an arterial road and passes through the communities of Hawkwood and Ranchlands with a speed limit of 60 km/h (37 mph). At Ranchlands Boulevard, it begins to transition to an expressway with the speed limit increasing to 70 km/h (43 mph) and becomes an expressway east of Sarcee Trail. John Laurie Boulevard continues east along the southern edge of Nose Hill Park to its eastern terminus at McKnight Boulevard.

The road is named for John Lee Laurie, a prominent educator and political activist in Calgary, best known for First Nations advocacy.

=== McKnight Boulevard ===
McKnight Boulevard begins in the northwestern community of North Haven at a T-intersection with John Laurie Boulevard and 48 Avenue NW as a four lane arterial road and continues east, with speed limits ranging between 50 and 60 km/h (31–37 mph). East of Deerfoot Trail (Highway 2), McKnight Boulevard becomes an expressway, with speed limits ranging between 70 and 80 km/h (43–50 mph), to the city limits east of Stoney Trail NE (Highway 201).

It is named for William Lidstone McKnight (1918–1941), a World War II flying ace with the Royal Air Force who had spent much of his childhood in Calgary before disappearing shortly after the Battle of Britain in combat. Prior to the road being renamed in his honour, the portion of the road west of what is now Deerfoot Trail conformed to Calgary's street numbering system, and was known as 48 Avenue N, while the eastern portion was part of Edmonton Trail until the city's road network in the northeast portion of the city was revised in the 1960s.

=== Neighborhoods ===
- Arbour Lake
- Hawkwood
- Ranchlands
- Edgemont
- Dalhousie
- Brentwood
- Charleswood
- Collingwood
- Cambrian Heights
- North Haven
- Thorncliffe
- Highwood
- Highland Park
- Greenview
- Greenview Industrial Park
- Skyline West (Industrial)
- Skyline East (Industrial)
- McCall (Industrial)
- North Airways (Industrial)
- Horizon (Industrial)
- Whitehorn
- Castleridge
- Temple
- Falconridge
- Monterey Park
- Coral Springs

== Future ==
Increased traffic along John Laurie and McKnight Boulevards has led to increased demands for improvements along the corridor. The City of Calgary has identified the intersection of 12 Street NE, just east of Deerfoot Trail, for a future interchange location; however, no timeline has been set for construction. There has also been renewed demand to improve the John Laurie Boulevard / McKnight Boulevard / 48 Avenue NW intersection; an interchange was proposed in 2005 but ultimately went unfunded.

== Major intersections ==
From west to east. The entire route is in Calgary.

km	mi	Destinations	Notes
0.0	0.0	Arbour Lake Road	Continues west
0.0	0.0	Arbour Wood Close, Arbour Lake Drive	John Laurie Boulevard western terminus
0.9	0.56	Nose Hill Drive	Traffic signals
1.4	0.87	Hawkwood Drive, Ranchero Drive	Traffic signals
2.1	1.3	Hawkwood Hill, Ranchlands Boulevard	Traffic signals
2.8	1.7	Hawkwood Boulevard	Traffic signals
3.1	1.9	Sarcee Trail	Traffic signals
4.2	2.6	Edgemont Boulevard, 53 Street NW	Traffic signals
4.7	2.9	Edgemont Drive	Traffic signals
5.4	3.4	Shaganappi Trail	Traffic signals
6.0	3.7	Brenner Drive	
6.5	4.0	Brisebois Drive	
7.5	4.7	Charleswood Drive	Traffic signals
8.4	5.2	19 Street NW	
9.3	5.8	14 Street NW	Single-point urban interchange
10.5 0.0	6.5 0.0	48 Avenue NW	T-intersection
10.5 0.0	6.5 0.0	John Laurie Boulevard eastern terminus • McKnight Boulevard western terminus	
0.9	0.56	4 Street NW	Traffic signals
1.5	0.93	Centre Street N	Traffic signals
2.1	1.3	4 Street NE, Edmonton Trail	Traffic signals
2.6– 3.4	1.6– 2.1	Deerfoot Trail (Highway 2) – Calgary International Airport	Partial cloverleaf interchange; exit 261 on Hwy 2
3.5	2.2	Aviation Boulevard, 12 Street NE	Traffic signals
4.1	2.5	Aviation Road	Westbound right-in/right-out
5.2	3.2	McCall Way, 19 Street NE	Traffic signals
5.9	3.7	Barlow Trail	Traffic signals
6.7– 7.9	4.2– 4.9	Métis Trail / 36 Street NE	Combination interchange
8.4	5.2	47 Street NE	Traffic signals
9.0	5.6	Falconridge Boulevard, 52 Street NE	Traffic signals
10.6	6.6	68 Street NE	Traffic signals
11.2– 12.2	7.0– 7.6	Stoney Trail (Highway 201)	Diamond interchange; Partial cloverleaf planned; exit 74 on Hwy 201
12.2	7.6	Township Road 250	Continues east towards Conrich and CN Intermodal terminal
1.000 mi = 1.609 km; 1.000 km = 0.621 mi: Incomplete access; Route transition

== See also ==
- Transportation in Calgary
