= Nose Creek =

Creek in Southern Alberta

- Native name: os-kewun

Location
- Country: Canada
- Province: Alberta
- Counties and Municipalities: Airdrie, Calgary, Crossfield, Rocky View County,

Physical characteristics
- Source
  - location: near Township Rd 292 north of Crossfield
  - coordinates: 51.474603°N 114.087580°W
- Mouth
  - location: Bow River next to the Calgary Zoo
  - coordinates: 51.044922°N 114.019596°W
- Length: 75 km (47 mi)

Basin features
- Bridges: Edward's Way Bridge

Nose Creek is a creek in Southern Alberta, Canada. It is a tributary of the larger Bow River.

== History ==
The name comes from the tradition of the Blackfoot to cut the tip of the noses off of unfaithful woman. Three tribes of the Blackfoot are known to have inhabited the Nose Creek Valley, those being the Kainai, Siksika, and Piikani. A cave near the hamlet of Madden contain paintings that are thought to belong to the Shoshone people, who occupied parts of Southern Alberta in the 1600s. Pioneers are said to have arrived in the area around 1792. Much of the sandstone used to construct buildings in Calgary following the Fire of 1886 were taken from Nose Creek. The Calgary-Edmonton trail followed a portion of the course of Nose Creek on its way to Edmonton. Since the early 20th century, portions of Nose Creek, especially in Calgary, have been channelized.

== Course ==
The main course of Nose Creek originates north of the town of Crossfield, travelling south through the town, further south it connects with West Nose Creek for the first time before continuing into the city of Airdrie. It travels through Airdrie. South of Airdrie, Alberta Highway 2, and continues south parallel to the hamlet of Balzac. It then enters Calgary, continuing its course next to the neighbourhoods of Coventry Hills and Harvest Hills before meeting up with West Nose Creek for the second time. It then passes next to the neighbourhoods of Huntington Hills, Thorncliffe, Highland Park, Winston Heights, Renfrew, and Bridgeland before entering the Bow River.

=== West Nose Creek ===
The source of West Nose Creek is the Niers Lakes, travelling east to meet up with Nose Creek between Crossfield and Airdrie, and travelling southwest, in an "S" shape before entering the boundaries of the city of Calgary. In Calgary it passes through the neighbourhoods of Evanston, Sage Hill, Kincora, Hidden Valley, Panorama Hills, Country Hills, Sandstone Valley, and Beddington Heights before merging with the main course of Nose Creek and continuing on to the Bow.

== List of parks along Nose Creek ==
=== Airdrie ===
- Williamstown Nose Creek Preserve
- Nose Creek Regional Park

=== Balzac ===
- Nose Creek Wetlands Park

=== Calgary ===
- Deerfoot-Stoney Trail Pathway
- Nose Creek Parkway
  - Nose Creek Park
  - West Nose Creek Park
  - Hidden Valley Park
  - Laycock Park
  - Renfrew Off Leash Park
  - Bottomlands Park
- TELUS Spark
- Calgary Zoo
- Bow River pathway

== Tributaries ==
- West Nose Creek
- Beddington Creek
- McPherson Creek
- Wet Creek

== See also ==
- List of rivers of Alberta
