= John G. Diefenbaker High School =

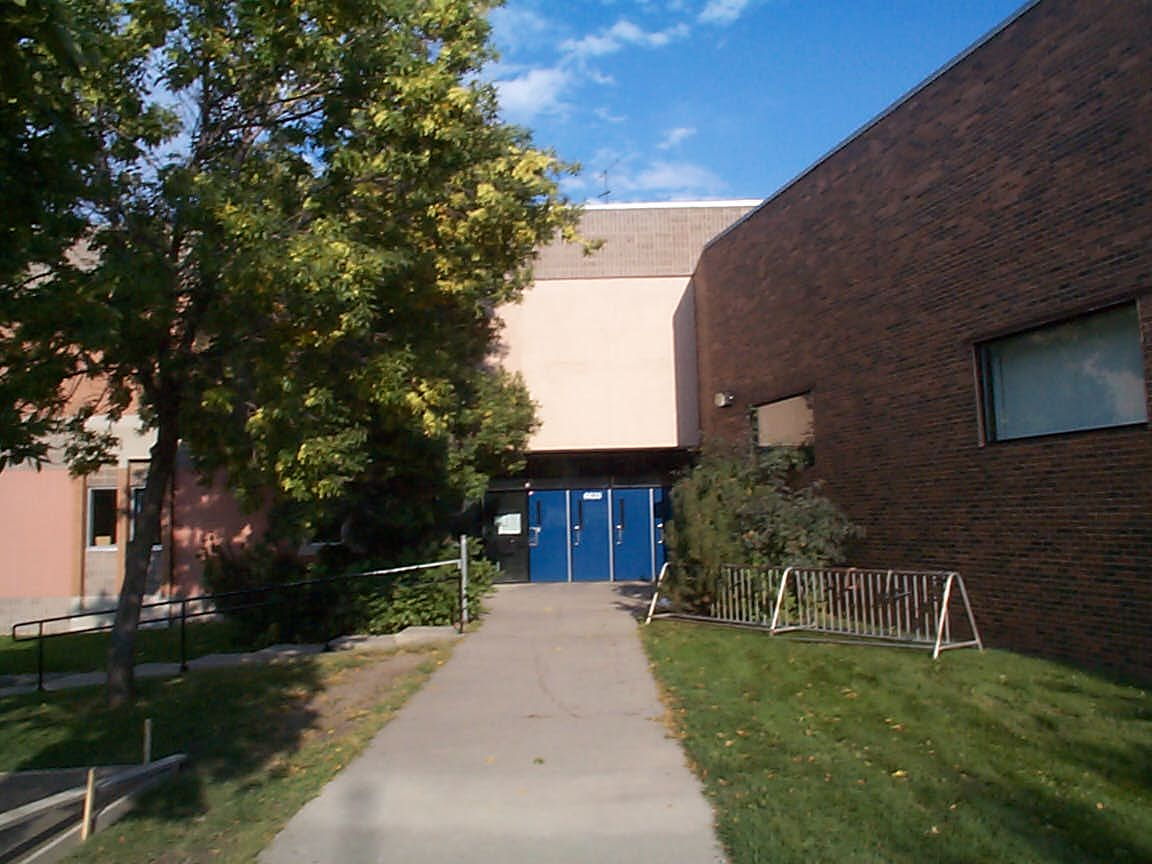

Location
- 6620 4 St NW; Calgary, Alberta, T2K 1C2; Canada; 51.1127°N 114.0700°W

Information
- Type: Public
- Motto: Freedom, Choice, Responsibility
- Established: 1971
- School board: Calgary Board of Education
- Principal: Jason Arrell
- Grades: 10, 11, 12
- Enrollment: 1317 (2024)
  - Grade 10: 476
  - Grade 11: 450
  - Grade 12: 391
- Campus: Urban
- Colours: Blue and White
- Team name: Chiefs
- Communities served: Regular and IB Programme:Beddington Heights, Evanston, Huntington Hills, Kincora, Thorncliffe, MacEwan Glen, Sage Hill, Sandstone Valley. IB Programme ONLY Communities: Panorama Hills, Harvest Hills, Country Hills, Coventry Hills, Hidden Valley, Livingston, North Haven
- Feeder schools: Colonel Irvine Jr. High, Georges P. Vanier Jr. High, Sir John A. Macdonald Jr. High, Captain Nichola Goddard Jr. High, Balmoral Middle School, F.E. Osborne Junior High School, Simon Fraser Junior High School, Valley Creek School.
- Website: https://johngdiefenbaker.cbe.ab.ca/

John G. Diefenbaker High School is a senior public high school located at 6620 4th Street N.W., Huntington Hills, Calgary, Alberta. The school is named after the 13th Prime Minister of Canada, John G. Diefenbaker. The school is part of the Calgary Board of Education. The school graduates around 400 Grade 12 students every year, with a 91% graduation rate. As of September 2024, there are 1317 students.

== History ==
John G. Diefenbaker High School was officially opened in February 1972 by Prime Minister John G. Diefenbaker, Canada's 13th Prime Minister, for whom the school is named. Over the years, The High School has undergone several developments to enhance its facilities. In 1990, an addition was made to the southeast corner of the building, which included a second gymnasium, science and math classrooms, and a mall area. The school is situated on a 14.64-acre campus and has 43 classrooms, two gymnasiums, three computer labs, and various specialized program offerings. In 2025, the Alberta government approved a $48.8 million modernization project for the school, aimed at further improving its infrastructure and educational facilities.

== Academics ==
John G. Diefenbaker High School is one of the five International Baccalaureate high schools in Calgary. On the Provincial Diplomas, John G. Diefenbaker performs well and is in the top five High Schools in the CBE.

=== Clubs ===
Competitive	Service	Interests
Concert Band; Symphonic Ensemble; Jazz Band; Chamber Choir; Concert Choir; Vocal Jazz; Girls Choir; Guys Choir; Math Contests; Debate Club; Speech Club; Basketball Intramurals; Stanley Can floor hockey intramurals; Science Olympics; Science fair; FTC Robotics Club	Student Council (Leadership); Diefenbaker News (Dief Days); Yearbook; Youth Volunteer Corps; Salvation Army; MAC Africa; Charity Dance Silent Auction; Environmental Club (Green Chiefs); DSA (Desi Societal Association); Culture and Diversity Club; Brave Dogs	Amnesty International Club; Graduation Committee; Bridging the Gap Seniors Club; Dungeons & Dragons Club; Art Club; Christian Club; Chinese Culture Club; Knitting Club; Ping Pong With Chong

== Athletics ==
Diefenbaker is known for their badminton and wrestling programs. John G. Diefenbaker Senior High Schools' wrestling team is among the best in Alberta, having won seven city championships as well as five Provincial titles. Its wrestling team was also the top ranked High School team in Canada in 2007, 2008 & 2009 according to the Canadian National Wrestling Association, having a large number of its members compete and obtain medals at the National Championships. In 2008 they set a Calgary record with 120 points in the city championships. In addition, Diefenbaker has won city championships in girls' rugby, badminton, and in 2011 the Senior Girls Field Hockey team won the first ever Division 1 city championship against Western Canada beating them 1–0 in overtime. Diefenbaker was also able to capture the DIV 3 city championship for SR boys volleyball in 2015-2016 and the DIV 3 city championship for SR girls basketball in 2017–2018.

== Music program ==
Diefenbaker High School band program consists of the Concert Band, and Jazz 1 and 2 Bands.

The Choir program consists of a Concert Choir and previously consisted of a Chamber Choir and Vocal Jazz.

The Music Department holds two annual public concerts: one in the fall or winter, and one in the spring.

== Notable alumni ==
- Jessie Foster – international endangered missing person and victim of human trafficking. Jessie graduated from JGD in 2002, was lured to the US in 2005 and has been missing since 2006. Jessie is Canada's 'Poster-Child' for this crime.
- Chris Gailus – television news anchor
- Mike Green – retired professional ice hockey player, played with the Washington Capitals, Detroit Red Wings and Edmonton Oilers.
- Tim Petros – professional football player who played his entire career for his hometown Calgary Stampeders.
- Ryan Radmanovich – professional baseball player, played with the Seattle Mariners
- Jeff Zimmerman – professional baseball player, played with the Texas Rangers and Seattle Mariners, MLB All-Star 1999
