= Greenview =

Greenview can refer to:

== Australia ==
- Greenview, Queensland, a locality in the South Burnett Region, Queensland

== Canada ==
- Greenview, Calgary, a neighbourhood in Calgary, Alberta
- Greenview, Edmonton, a neighbourhood in Edmonton, Alberta
- Municipal District of Greenview No. 16, a municipal district in Alberta

== United States ==
- Greenview, California
- Greenview, Illinois
