= Tim Petros =

Canadian football player (1961–2020)

Profile
- Position: Running back

Personal information
- Born: September 12, 1961; Calgary, Alberta, Canada
- Died: March 30, 2020 (aged 58); Calgary, Alberta, Canada
- Listed height: 5 ft 10 in (1.78 m)
- Listed weight: 180 lb (82 kg)

Career information
- High school: Calgary (AB) Diefenbaker
- University: Calgary

Career history
- 1984–1990: Calgary Stampeders

Tim Petros (September 12, 1961 – March 30, 2020) was a Canadian professional football player who played for the Calgary Stampeders from 1984 to 1990. He previously played football at the University of Calgary. Petros died after a heart attack in 2020.
