= Greenview, Calgary =

Greenview
- Neighbourhood
- Location of Greenview in Calgary
- Coordinates: 51°05′38″N 114°03′18″W
- Country: Canada
- Province: Alberta
- City: Calgary
- Quadrant: NW
- Ward: 4
- Established: 1991

Government
  - Mayor: Jeromy Farkas
  - Administrative body: Calgary City Council
  - Councillor: DJ Kelly (The Calgary Party)
- Elevation: 1,050 m (3,440 ft)

Population (2006)
  - Total: 2,013
  - Average Income: $45,898
- Website: Greenview Community Association

Greenview is a residential neighbourhood in the northeast quadrant of Calgary, Alberta. It is bounded to the north by 64 Avenue N, to the east by Deerfoot Trail, to the south by McKnight Boulevard and Edmonton Trail and to the west by 14 Street W.

The area was part of the Thorncliffe/Greenview neighbourhood until 1991, when it was divided into Thorncliffe, North Haven and Greenview. It is represented in the Calgary City Council by the Ward 4 councillor.

The postal code in this area is T2E.

== Demographics ==
In the City of Calgary's 2012 municipal census, Greenview had a population of 1,975 living in 1,120 dwellings, a 1% increase from its 2011 population of 1,956. With a land area of 0.5 km^{2} (0.19 sq mi), it had a population density of 4,000/km^{2} (10,200/sq mi) in 2012.

Residents in this community had a median household income of $45,898 in 2000, and there were 19% low income residents living in the neighbourhood. As of 2000, 20.6% of the residents were immigrants. A proportion of 48.5% of the buildings were condominiums or apartments, and 65.4% of the housing was used for renting.

Pop. Overtime
| Year | Population |
|---|---|
| 2014 | 2142 |
| 2015 | 2113 |
| 2016 | 1977 |
| 2017 | 2036 |
| 2018 | 1999 |
| 2019 | 1906 |
| 2021 | 2100 |

== Crime ==
Crime Data
| Year | Crime Rate (/100 pop.) |
|---|---|
| 2018 | 4.7 |
| 2019 | 4.0 |
| 2020 | 3.4 |
| 2021 | 2.7 |
| 2022 | 3.5 |
| 2023 | 2.4 |

== Education ==
The community is served by Colonel Sanders Elementary, Thorncliffe Elementary and Greenview Bilingual Elementary public schools, as well as Corpus Christi Elementary School (Catholic).

== See also ==
- List of neighbourhoods in Calgary
