= Ryan Radmanovich =

Canadian baseball player (born 1971)

- Right fielder
- Born: August 9, 1971 (age 54); Calgary, Alberta, Canada
- Batted: Left Threw: Right

MLB debut
- April 13, 1998, for the Seattle Mariners

Last MLB appearance
- September 27, 1998, for the Seattle Mariners

MLB statistics
- Batting average: .217
- Home runs: 2
- Runs batted in: 10
- Stats at Baseball Reference

Teams
- Seattle Mariners (1998)
Medals
Men's baseball
Representing Canada
Pan American Games
Bronze medal – third place	1999 Winnipeg	Team

Ryan Ashley Radmanovich (born August 9, 1971) is a Canadian former professional baseball player. He played in 25 games in Major League Baseball (MLB) for the Seattle Mariners in 1998, primarily as a right fielder. He played for Canada in international competition, including three Summer Olympics and was the first MLB player from Calgary, Alberta.

== Career ==
Radmanovich played high school baseball at John G. Diefenbaker High School in Calgary, where he was teammates with future MLB pitcher Jeff Zimmerman. Radmanovich then played college baseball at Allan Hancock Junior College and Pepperdine University, where he was an All-West Coast Conference player and hit .305 with 14 home runs in his one season with the Waves.

Radmanovich was drafted by the Minnesota Twins (14th round, 401 overall) in the 1993 MLB draft. He tore his left anterior cruciate ligament in 1995 but was a minor league all-star in 1996 and 1997. The Mariners selected him off waivers in March 1998. He played 25 games with the Mariners that season. He got a hit in his fourth MLB game, a single off Mike Morgan, but batted 1-for-22 in his first two stints with Seattle. He later hit .298 with two home runs as a September call-up.

Radmanovich then played in Triple-A through 2002 before moving on to the Mexican Baseball League in 2003. He finished his professional playing career in the Atlantic League of Professional Baseball, with his final season in 2009 with the Bridgeport Bluefish.

Radmanovich played for the Canada national team in the 1992 Summer Olympics and 1999 Pan-Am Games. He was the starting right fielder for the Canada in the 2004 Summer Olympic Games in Athens, Greece. He also played for Canada in the 2006 World Baseball Classic and the 2008 Summer Olympics.

== See also ==
- List of Major League Baseball players from Canada
