= Edward's Way Bridge =

Historic bridge in Airdrie, Alberta

1928 Nose Creek Bridge to the Elevators
- Coordinates: 51.2911°N 114.02023°W
- Carries: Pathway for bikes and pedestrians
- Crosses: Nose Creek
- Locale: Alberta
- Maintained by: City of Airdrie
- Preceded by: Unnamed wooden bridge

Characteristics
- Design: Single span pony truss
- Material: Steel, wood
- Total length: 26 metres (85 ft)
- Width: 6 metres (20 ft)
- Load limit: 20 tons

History
- Constructed by: Dominion Bridge Company
- Construction start: 1928
- Construction end: 1928
- Opened: 1928

Location
- Interactive map of 1928 Nose Creek Bridge to the Elevators

Edward's Way Bridge, also known as the 1928 Nose Creek Bridge to the Elevators, is a small wood and steel truss bridge over Nose Creek, in Airdrie, Alberta, Canada. It was designated a Municipal Historic Resource by the City of Airdrie in 2019, the first Municipal Historic Resource in the city.

== Design ==
The Edward's Way Bridge is a pony truss bridge designed by the Dominion Bridge Company in Montreal, and carried by train to Airdrie where it was assembled by contractors. Its narrow width allows for it to carry large loads without requiring an overhead truss. The truss, below beams, handrail, and wheel guards are steel, while the deck is wooden.

== Heritage value ==
The bridge's heritage value comes from its connection to the original railway landscape of Airdrie. The bridge once connected the village of Airdrie to multiple agricultural and industrial structures on the rail line, including a reservoir, multiple grain elevators, a grain warehouse, two sidings, stockyards, coal sheds, a water tower which was pumped by a windmill, and a railway station featuring a platform, station house, and section house. As Airdrie's industry started to shift away from the railway, these structures started to be demolished and dismantled, starting with the water tower, which was no longer needed due to trains switching to diesel. The station, coal sheds, and stockyards followed soon after. The 1980s saw the reservoir being filled in, and multiple grain elevators demolished. The last remaining buildings, two Alberta Wheat Pool grain elevators, were demolished in 2000, leaving the bridge as the only remaining structure connected to Airdrie's railroad history. Because of this, the Airdrie city council designated it a Municipal Historic Resource in May, 2019.

== History ==
Talk of the construction of a steel bridge in this location existed as early as 1921. Planning for the bridge, which connected Airdrie to the Calgary and Edmonton Railway, began in 1927. This was done following requests by the Municipal District of Beddington No. 250 for a steel bridge to replace an earlier constructed wooden one. This request fell under the jurisdiction of the Department of Public Works, which contracted the Dominion Bridge Company for the job. The Dominion Bridge Company had already been contracted by the Department of Public Works for another steel bridge over Nose Creek on 1st Avenue, which had been completed in 1925. The bridge was finished in 1928, opening the same year. The bridge stayed in operation until 1983 when it was closed to vehicle traffic, mainly due to its narrowness. Afterwards, the bridge began to be known as the "bridge to nowhere", due to its lack of a road. In 2015, a fire damaged one of the bridges wooden abutments, leading to its closure. Following its designation as a Municipal Historic Resource, the bridge was repaired, and reopened in 2020.

== See also ==
- List of bridges in Canada
