= Falconridge =

- Neighbourhood
- Location of Falconridge in Calgary
- Coordinates: 51°06′19″N 113°56′43″W
- Country: Canada
- Province: Alberta
- City: Calgary
- Quadrant: NE
- Ward: 5
- Established: 1979
- Annexed: 1961

Government
  - Mayor: Jeromy Farkas
  - Administrative body: Calgary City Council
  - Councillor: Raj Dhaliwal (Independent)

Area
  - Total: 2.1 km^{2} (0.81 sq mi)
- Elevation: 1,100 m (3,600 ft)

Population (2006)
  - Total: 10,229
  - Average Income: $48,512
- Website: Falconridge Community Association

Falconridge is a residential neighbourhood in the northeast quadrant of Calgary, Alberta. It's bounded by Falconridge Boulevard to the west, 64 Avenue N to the north, 68 Street E to the east and McKnight Boulevard to the south

The area was part of the Municipal District of Rocky View until it was annexed to the City of Calgary in 1961. Falconridge was established in 1979. It is represented in the Calgary City Council by the Ward 5 councillor.

== Demographics ==
In the City of Calgary's 2012 municipal census, Falconridge had a population of 10,381 living in 3,478 dwellings, a 3.4% increase from its 2011 population of 10,043. With a land area of 2.2 km^{2} (0.85 sq mi), it had a population density of 4,720/km^{2} (12,220/sq mi) in 2012.

Residents in this community had a median household income of $48,512 in 2000, and there were 24.5% low income residents living in the neighbourhood. As of 2000, 32% of the residents were immigrants. A proportion of 6.5% of the buildings were condominiums or apartments, and 33% of the housing was used for renting.

== Education ==
The community is served by Falconridge Elementary, Grant MacEwan Elementary, O. S. Geiger Elementary and Terry Fox Junior High public schools, as well as by John XXIII Elementary & Junior High, Bishop McNally High School and John Paul II Elementary School (Catholic).

== See also ==
- List of neighbourhoods in Calgary
