= Ranchlands, Calgary =

Ranchlands
- Neighbourhood
- Location of Ranchlands in Calgary
- Coordinates: 51°07′00″N 114°10′50″W
- Country: Canada
- Province: Alberta
- City: Calgary
- Quadrant: NW
- Ward: 2
- Established: 1977
- Annexed: 1961

Government
  - Mayor: Jeromy Farkas
  - Administrative body: Calgary City Council
  - Councillor: Jennifer Wyness (Independent)

Area
  - Total: 2.3 km^{2} (0.89 sq mi)
- Elevation: 1,160 m (3,810 ft)

Population (2006)
  - Total: 7,698
  - Average Income: $60,727
- Website: Ranchlands Community Association

Ranchlands is a residential neighbourhood in the northwest quadrant of Calgary, Alberta. It is bounded to the north by John Laurie Boulevard, to the east by Sarcee Trail, to the south by Crowchild Trail and to the west by Nose Hill Drive.

The area was annexed to the City of Calgary in 1961 and Ranchlands was established in 1977. It is represented in the Calgary City Council by the Ward 2 councillor.

== Demographics ==
In the City of Calgary's 2012 municipal census, Ranchlands had a population of 7,626 living in 3,051 dwellings, a 1.3% increase from its 2011 population of 7,529. With a land area of 2.3 km^{2} (0.89 sq mi), it had a population density of 3,320/km^{2} (8,590/sq mi) in 2012.

Residents in this community had a median household income of $60,727 in 2000, and there were 15.1% low income residents living in the neighbourhood. As of 2000, 21.7% of the residents were immigrants. A proportion of 9% of the buildings were condominiums or apartments, and 27.4% of the housing was used for renting.

== Education ==
The community is served by Ranchlands Community public school. It is served by St. Rita Elementary School under the Catholic Board of Education. Two weekend Islamic Schools are also in Ranchlands, namely Northwest Islamic School (NWIS) and Al-Salam Academy.

== Transportation ==
The community of Ranchlands is served by the following routes by Calgary Transit: 97, 113 & 76.

== Amenities ==
Ranchlands contains 3 separate strip malls. Various restaurants, outlets, clinics, gyms, banks and other amenities are found in these plazas. Additionally, Ranchlands is served by three churches: St. James Anglican Church, Westview Baptist Church & Kingdom Hall of Jehovah's Witnesses. Ranchlands is also served by two mosques, namely: the Northwest Calgary Islamic Center (run by IANWC) and Al-Salam Center (run by MAC).

Ranchlands also contains an outdoor tennis court (located next to the Ranchlands Public School) an outdoor rink and basketball court (located next to the community association building, multiple soccer fields and 2 off leash dog parks; Wildflower Park and Ranchlands Off-Leash Park.

There are 12 playgrounds in this community, including the ones located at each school and one at the community association.

In winter, both the rink and basketball court adjacent to the community association building are flooded to create ice skating surfaces. This is completed by a team of volunteers with the community association, affectionately referred to as the "Rink Rats". Both surfaces are free to use and open to the public however hockey is only allowed in the rink and no hockey pucks, ball, sticks or nets are allowed on Wednesdays and Sundays as these are designated leisure skating days.

== See also ==
- List of neighbourhoods in Calgary
