= Deer Run, Calgary =

Deer Run
- Neighbourhood
- Location of Deer Run in Calgary
- Coordinates: 50°55′05″N 114°00′30″W
- Country: Canada
- Province: Alberta
- City: Calgary
- Quadrant: SE
- Ward: 14
- Established: 1978
- Annexed: 1961

Government
  - Mayor: Jeromy Farkas
  - Administrative body: Calgary City Council
  - Councillor: Landon Johnston (Independent)

Area
  - Total: 1.1 km^{2} (0.42 sq mi)
- Elevation: 1,020 m (3,350 ft)

Population (2016)
  - Total: 5,120
  - Average Income: $106,486
- Website: Deer Run Community Association

Deer Run is a residential neighbourhood in the southeast quadrant of Calgary, Alberta. It is located in a bend of the Bow River, and is surrounded to the east and south by the Fish Creek Provincial Park. It is bounded to the north by North Deersaxon Circle and the community of Deer Ridge and to the west by Bow Bottom Trail.

The land was annexed to the City of Calgary in 1961 and Deer Run was established in 1978. It is represented in the Calgary City Council by the Ward 14 councillor.

== Demographics ==
In the City of Calgary's 2012 municipal census, Deer Run had a population of 5,341 living in 2,113 dwellings, a -0.9% increase from its 2011 population of 5,390. With a land area of 1.9 km^{2} (0.73 sq mi), it had a population density of 2,810/km^{2} (7,280/sq mi) in 2012.

Residents in this community had a median household income of $106,486 in 2015, and there were 6% low income residents living in the neighbourhood. As of 2016, 17% of the residents were immigrants and 2% of residents identified as either First Nations or Métis. As of 2016 12% of the buildings were condominiums or apartments, and 19% of the housing was used for renting.

Pop. Overtime
Year	Population
2014	5335
2015	5319
2016	5182
2017	5111
2018	5046
2019	5065
2021	4910

== Education ==
The community is served by Deer Run Elementary public school, and designated out of district junior high school and high school is provided by Wilma Hansen Junior High and Lord Beaverbrook High School.

== See also ==
- List of neighbourhoods in Calgary
