= Shepard Industrial, Calgary =

Shepard Industrial
- Neighbourhood
- Location of Shepard Industrial in Calgary
- Coordinates: 50°57′54″N 113°59′57″W
- Country: Canada
- Province: Alberta
- City: Calgary
- Quadrant: SE
- Wards: 9, 12

Government
  - Mayor: Jeromy Farkas
  - Administrative body: Calgary City Council
  - Councillors: Harrison Clark (Independent) Mike Jamieson (A Better Calgary)
- Elevation: 1,020 m (3,350 ft)

Population (2006)
  - Total: 272
  - Average Income: $37,383

Shepard Industrial is a neighbourhood in the southeast quadrant of Calgary, Alberta. Although predominantly industrial, it contains a pocket of residential area in the northwest corner, including a mobile home park.

It is represented in the Calgary City Council by Ward 9 and 12 councillors.

It is more commonly well known by the unofficial names of Shepard or South Hill.

== Demographics ==
In the City of Calgary's 2012 municipal census, Shepard Industrial had a population of 251 living in 151 dwellings, a 0.4% increase from its 2011 population of 250. With a land area of 4.2 km^{2} (1.6 sq mi), it had a population density of 59.8/km^{2} (154.8/sq mi) in 2012.

Residents in this community had a median household income of $37,383 in 2000, and there were 25.1% low income residents living in the neighbourhood. As of 2000, 6.9% of the residents were immigrants. All buildings were single-family detached homes or mobile homes, and 7.1% of the housing was used for renting.

== See also ==
- List of neighbourhoods in Calgary
