= Royal Vista, Calgary =

Royal Vista
- Business park
- Location of Royal Vista in Calgary
- Coordinates: 51.151°N 114.205°W
- Country: Canada
- Province: Alberta
- City: Calgary
- Quadrant: NW
- Ward: 2

Government
  - Mayor: Jeromy Farkas
  - Administrative body: Calgary City Council
  - Councillor: Jennifer Wyness (Independent)

Population (2011)
  - Total: 0
- Time zone: UTC-7 (Mountain)
- Area code: 403 587

Royal Vista is a business park in the northwest quadrant of Calgary, Alberta, Canada. It is bounded by Country Hills Boulevard to the southwest, Stoney Trail to the southeast, and 112 Avenue N.W. to the north.

== See also ==
- List of neighbourhoods in Calgary
