= Tuxedo Park, Calgary =

Tuxedo Park
- Neighbourhood
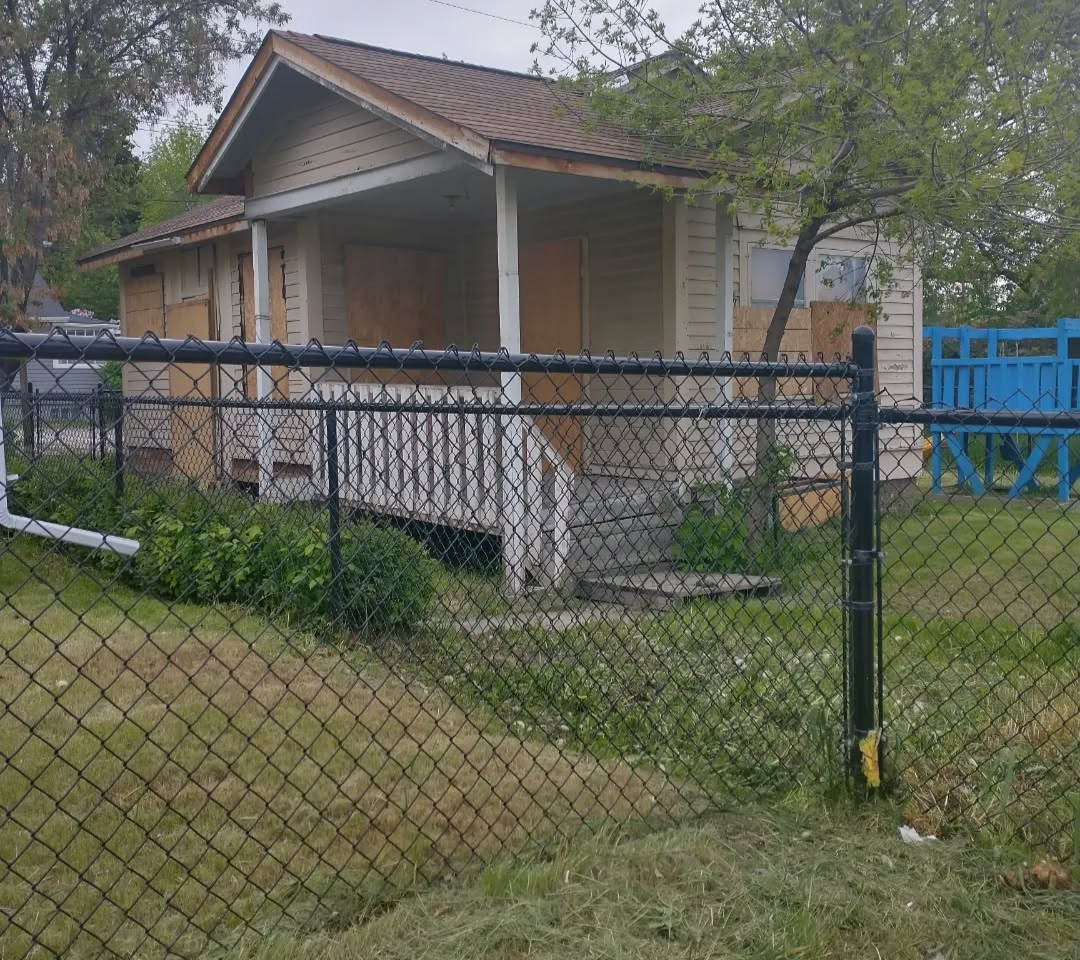
- Abandoned house in Tuxedo Park

- Location of Tuxedo Park in Calgary
- Coordinates: 51°04′40″N 114°03′45″W
- Country: Canada
- Province: Alberta
- City: Calgary
- Quadrant: NE, NW
- Ward: 7
- Established: 1929
- Annexed: 1910

Government
  - Mayor: Jeromy Farkas
  - Administrative body: Calgary City Council
  - Councillor: Myke Atkinson (Independent)
- Elevation: 1,070 m (3,510 ft)

Population (2008)
  - Total: 4,565
  - Average Income: $46,027
- Website: Tuxedo Park Community Association

Tuxedo Park is a residential neighbourhood in the northeast and northwest quadrants of Calgary, Alberta. The inner-city community is bounded by 32 Avenue N to the north, Edmonton Trail to the east, the Trans-Canada Highway to the south, and 2 Street NW to the west. The community is bisected by Centre Street from north to south.

Tuxedo was annexed by the city in 1910 and established as a neighbourhood in 1929. It is represented on the Calgary City Council by the Ward 9 councillor.

== Demographics ==
In the City of Calgary's 2012 municipal census, Tuxedo Park had a population of 4,571 living in 2,686 dwellings, a 3.2% increase from its 2011 population of 4,430. With a land area of 1.3 km^{2} (0.50 sq mi), it had a population density of 3,520/km^{2} (9,100/sq mi) in 2012.

Residents in this community had a median household income of $46,027 in 2005, and there were 21.3% low income residents living in the neighbourhood. As of 2006, 19.2% of the residents were immigrants. A proportion of 51.0% of the buildings were condominiums or apartments, and 53.9% of the housing was used for renting.

== Crime ==
Tuxedo Park had seen significant issues since the late 2010s with crime, social disorder, and urban decay, however has managed to lower its crime rate marginally within recent years.

Crime Data
Year	Crime Rate (/100 pop.)
2018	5.5
2019	6.5
2020	5.4
2021	5.4
2022	4.9
2023	4.6

== Education ==
Balmoral Junior High public school and St. Paul School (Catholic) are located in Tuxedo Park. Kindergarten to Grade 6 students attend Buchanan, Rosedale, and Mount View Elementary Schools. Grades 7-9 students attend G. P. Vanier Junior High School, Balmoral Junior High School and St. Joseph Junior High School (Catholic). Grades 10-12 students attend either James Fowler High School or Crescent Heights High School.

== Transportation ==
=== CTrain ===
In 2020, Calgary City Council approved the construction of 16 Avenue North Station, part of the Calgary Green Line. The station will be at-grade on Centre Street, between 16 Avenue N - 14 Avenue N. Construction will begin in 2024.

Major Roads:

- Centre Street N, cuts through Tuxedo Park (north-south)
- Edmonton Trail NE (east border)
- 16 Avenue N / Trans-Canada Highway (south border)
- 32 Avenue N (north border)
- 20 Avenue N (cuts through Tuxedo Park (west-east))
- 4 Street NW (located nearby to the west)
- 12 Avenue N (located nearby to the south)

Bus Routes (Calgary Transit, March 2018):

- Route 2 Killarney-17th Ave / Mount Pleasant
- Route 3 Heritage / Sandstone
- Route 4 Huntington
- Route 5 North Haven
- Route 17 Renfrew / Ramsay
- Route 19 16th Avenue North
- Route 62 Hidden Valley (Express)
- Route 64 MacEwan (Express)
- Route 69 Deerfoot Centre
- Route 109 Harvest Hills (Express)
- Route 116 Coventry Hills (Express)
- Route 142 Panorama Hills (Express)
- Route 300 BRT Airport / City Centre
- Route 301 BRT North / City Centre

== See also ==
- List of neighbourhoods in Calgary
