= Monterey Park, Calgary =

Monterey Park
- Neighbourhood
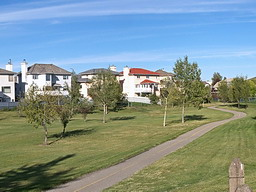
- Monterey Park residential homes

- Location of Monterey Park in Calgary
- Coordinates: 51°04′54″N 113°55′44″W
- Country: Canada
- Province: Alberta
- City: Calgary
- Quadrant: NE
- Ward: 5
- Established: 1985
- Annexed: 1979

Government
  - Mayor: Jeromy Farkas
  - Administrative body: Calgary City Council
  - Councillor: Raj Dhaliwal (Independent)

Area
  - Total: 2.7 km^{2} (1.0 sq mi)
- Elevation: 1,075 m (3,527 ft)

Population (2006)
  - Total: 10,599
  - Average Income: $64,208
- Website: Monterey Park Community Association

Monterey Park is a residential neighbourhood in the northeast quadrant of Calgary, Alberta. It is at the eastern edge of the city, bounded by McKnight Boulevard to the north, 68 Street E to the west, Trans-Canada Highway to the south and 84 Street E (city limits) to the east.

The land was annexed to the city of Calgary between 1979 and 1983, and Monterey Park was established in 1985. It was named for the city of Monterey Park, California, and the neighbourhood has a California theme (such as street names and building styles). It is represented in the Calgary City Council by the Ward 5 councillor.

The area's postal code is T1Y.

== Demographics ==
In the City of Calgary's 2012 municipal census, Monterey Park had a population of 10,470 living in 3,164 dwellings, a 0.1% increase from its 2011 population of 10,460. With a land area of 3.4 km^{2} (1.3 sq mi), it had a population density of 3,080/km^{2} (7,980/sq mi) in 2012.

Residents in this community had a median household income of $64,208 in 2000, and there were 9.9% low income residents living in the neighbourhood. As of 2000, 45.1% of the residents were immigrants. Most buildings were single-family detached homes, and 6.3% of the housing was used for renting.

== Crime ==
Crime Data
Year	Crime Rate (/100 pop.)
2018	1.6
2019	1.5
2020	1.4
2021	1.2
2022	1.3
2023	1.1

== Education ==
This neighbourhood has one public elementary school: Monterey Park Elementary School. (K-6)

== See also ==
- List of neighbourhoods in Calgary
