= Coral Springs, Calgary =

Coral Springs
- Neighbourhood
- Location of Coral Springs in Calgary
- Coordinates: 51°06′15″N 113°55′48″W
- Country: Canada
- Province: Alberta
- City: Calgary
- Quadrant: NE
- Ward: 5
- Established: 1991

Government
  - Mayor: Jeromy Farkas
  - Administrative body: Calgary City Council
  - Councillor: Raj Dhaliwal (Independent)
- Elevation: 1,090 m (3,580 ft)

Population (2006)
  - Total: 6,166
  - Average Income: $83,067
- Website: Coral Springs Community Association

Coral Springs is a residential neighbourhood in the northeast quadrant of Calgary, Alberta. It is located at the eastern edge of the city and is bounded by 64 Avenue N to the north, McKnight Boulevard to the south, 68 Street E to the west and 84 Street E and the Rocky View County to the east.

Coral Springs is a new community, established in 1991. It was built with an architectural style and layout that emphasizes its Californian theme, with a lake at the center of the neighbourhood. It is represented in the Calgary City Council by the Ward 5 councillor.

== Demographics ==
In the City of Calgary's 2012 municipal census, Coral Springs had a population of 5,868 living in 1,508 dwellings, a 0.5% increase from its 2011 population of 5,838. With a land area of 1.8 km^{2} (0.69 sq mi), it had a population density of 3,260/km^{2} (8,440/sq mi) in 2012.

Residents in this community had a median household income of $83,067 in 2000, and there were 10.4% low income residents living in the neighbourhood. As of 2000, 45.3% of the residents were immigrants. All buildings were single-family detached homes, and only 2.7% of the housing was used for renting. It is currently the wealthiest community in NE Calgary, and home to a significant Ismaili and Sikh population.

== Crime ==
Crime Data
Year	Crime Rate (/100 pop.)
2018	1.5
2019	1.8
2020	1.1
2021	1.3
2022	1.3
2023	1.0

== See also ==
- List of neighbourhoods in Calgary
