= North Haven, Calgary =

North Haven
- Neighbourhood
- Location of North Haven in Calgary
- Coordinates: 51°05′46″N 114°05′24″W
- Country: Canada
- Province: Alberta
- City: Calgary
- Quadrant: NW
- Ward: 4
- Established: 1963

Government
  - Mayor: Jeromy Farkas
  - Administrative body: Calgary City Council
  - Councillor: DJ Kelly (The Calgary Party)

Area
  - Total: 0.5 km^{2} (0.19 sq mi)
- Elevation: 1,140 m (3,740 ft)

Population (2009)
  - Total: 2,323
  - Average Income: $56,142
- Website: North Haven Community Association

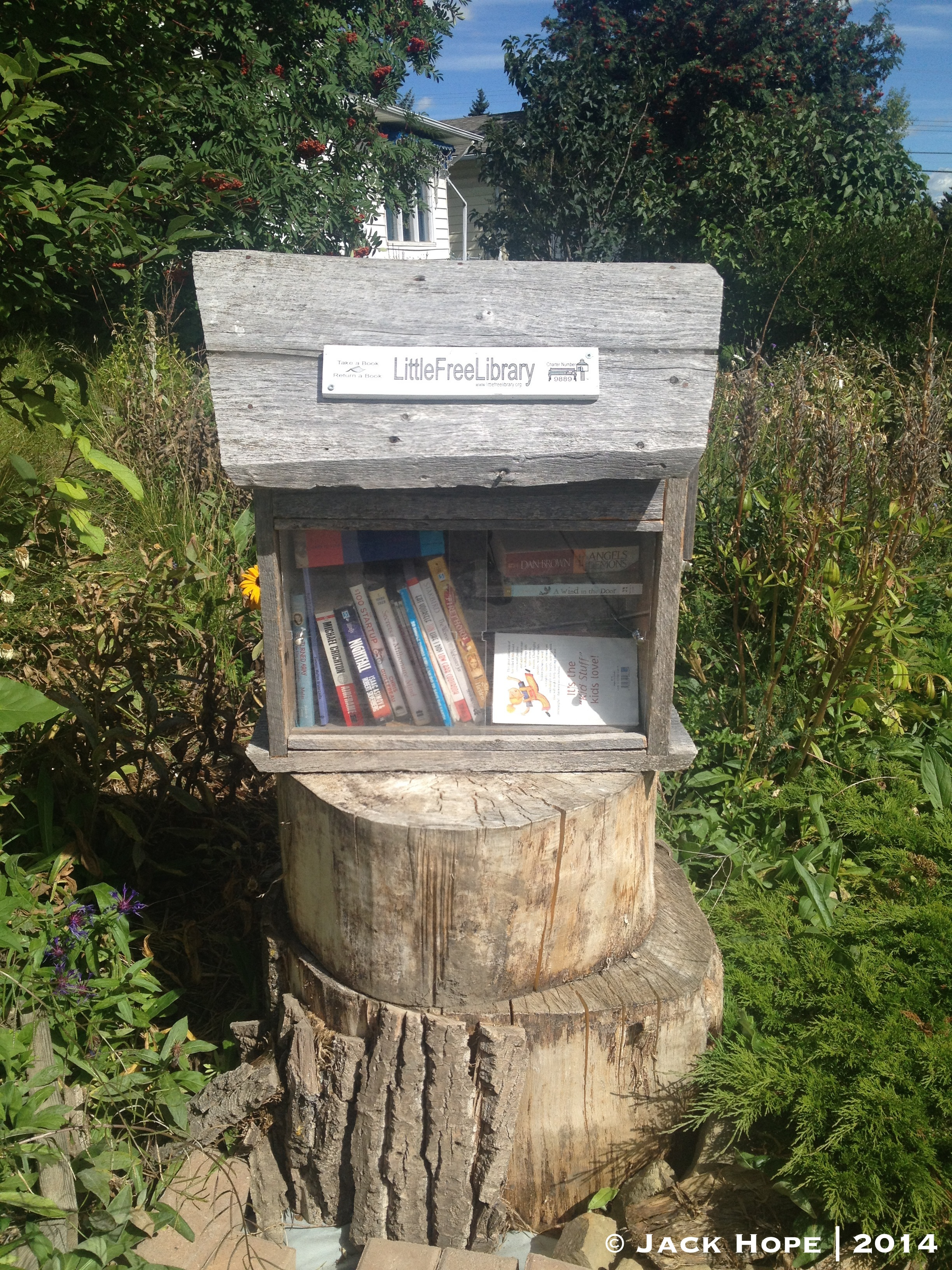
Little Free Library in Calgary

North Haven is a residential neighbourhood in the northwest quadrant of Calgary, Alberta. The community is split by a bus trap into "Lower North Haven" on the south side and "Upper North Haven" on the north side.

North Haven was established in 1963. Development of Lower North Haven took place between 1962 and 1971. The development of Upper North Haven started in 1977. Previously the land was primarily cattle grazing ranch land, part of the once vast grazing leases of the city's famed early ranchers, Pat Burns. The community is represented in the Calgary City Council by the Ward 4 Councillor. The neighbourhood has a community association and a community hall to serve its residents.

North Haven is bordered on the west/northwest by Nose Hill Park and 14th Street NW, along the south/southeast by John Laurie Boulevard, which separates it from the neighbourhoods of Cambrian Heights and Highwood, and along the east/northeast by Egerts Park, which separates it from the neighbourhood of Thorncliffe.

== Demographics ==
In the City of Calgary's 2012 municipal census, North Haven had a population of 2,288 living in 988 dwellings, a 0.3% increase from its 2011 population of 2,282. With a land area of 0.8 km^{2} (0.31 sq mi), it had a population density of 2,860/km^{2} (7,400/sq mi) in 2012. Also in the 2012 municipal census, North Haven Upper had a population of 622 living in 246 dwellings, a 1.1% increase from its 2011 population of 615. With a land area of 0.3 km^{2} (0.12 sq mi), it had a population density of 2,100/km^{2} (5,400/sq mi) in 2012.

Residents in this community had a median household income of $56,142 in 2000 ($77,803 in UNH), and there were 10.8% low income residents living in the neighbourhood. As of 2000, 14.9% of the residents were immigrants. A proportion of 5.1% of the buildings were condominiums or apartments, and 24.5% of the housing was used for renting.

== Education ==
The community is served by North Haven Elementary public school. The neighbourhood's designated public Junior High and High Schools are Colonel Irvine and John G. Diefenbaker Sr. High School for Upper North Haven Residents and James Fowler High School for lower North Haven residents respectively.

== Notable people ==
Todd McFarlane, a Canadian comic book artist, writer, toy manufacturer/designer, and media entrepreneur who is best known as the creator of the epic occult fantasy series Spawn, spent his early years in North Haven.

== See also ==
- List of neighbourhoods in Calgary
