= Deer Ridge, Calgary =

Deer Ridge
- Neighbourhood
- Location of Deer Ridge in Calgary
- Coordinates: 50°55′35″N 114°00′51″W
- Country: Canada
- Province: Alberta
- City: Calgary
- Quadrant: SE
- Ward: 14
- Established: 1978
- Annexed: 1961

Government
  - Mayor: Jeromy Farkas
  - Administrative body: Calgary City Council
  - Councillor: Landon Johnston (Independent)

Area
  - Total: 2.0 km^{2} (0.77 sq mi)
- Elevation: 1,020 m (3,350 ft)

Population (2006)
  - Total: 4,344
  - Average Income: $59,149
- Website: Deer Ridge Community Association

Deer Ridge is a residential neighbourhood in the southeast quadrant of Calgary, Alberta. It is located in the Bow River valley, and is bounded to the north by Canyon Meadows Drive, to the east by Deercliff Road and the Bow River, to the south by Deerfield Circle and the community of Deer Run and to the west by Bow Bottom Trail. Fish Creek Provincial Park is located immediately east.

The land was annexed into the City of Calgary in 1961, and Deer Ridge was established in 1978. It is represented in the Calgary City Council by the Ward 14 councillor.

== Deer Valley Marketplace ==
Deer Valley Marketplace is a defunct shopping mall turned outdoor shopping plaza located in Deer Ridge. It originally opened as an enclosed shopping mall at an unknown time, but would be partially demolished in 2012, with it briefly going through a period of abandonment.

The original anchor tenants of the mall were Calgary Co-op and Zellers, when the Zellers closed, it would be converted into a Walmart Canada location. The Walmart location at the shopping centre would shutter in 2022 and be left vacant for several years, before being replaced with an indoor entertainment complex.

== Demographics ==
In the City of Calgary's 2012 municipal census, Deer Ridge had a population of 4,084 living in 1,501 dwellings, a 2.3% increase from its 2011 population of 3,991. With a land area of 1.4 km^{2} (0.54 sq mi), it had a population density of 2,920/km^{2} (7,560/sq mi) in 2012.

Residents in this community had a median household income of $59,149 in 2000, and there were 17.1% low income residents living in the neighbourhood. As of 2000, 15.2% of the residents were immigrants. A proportion of 10.5% of the buildings were condominiums or apartments, and 36% of the housing was used for renting.

Pop. Overtime
Year	Population
2014	4176
2015	4327
2016	4121
2017	4097
2018	4042
2019	3973
2021	3795

== Education ==
The community is served by Don Bosco Elementary & Junior High school adjacent from Wilma Hansen Junior High School.

== See also ==
- List of neighbourhoods in Calgary
