= Arbour Lake =

- Neighbourhood
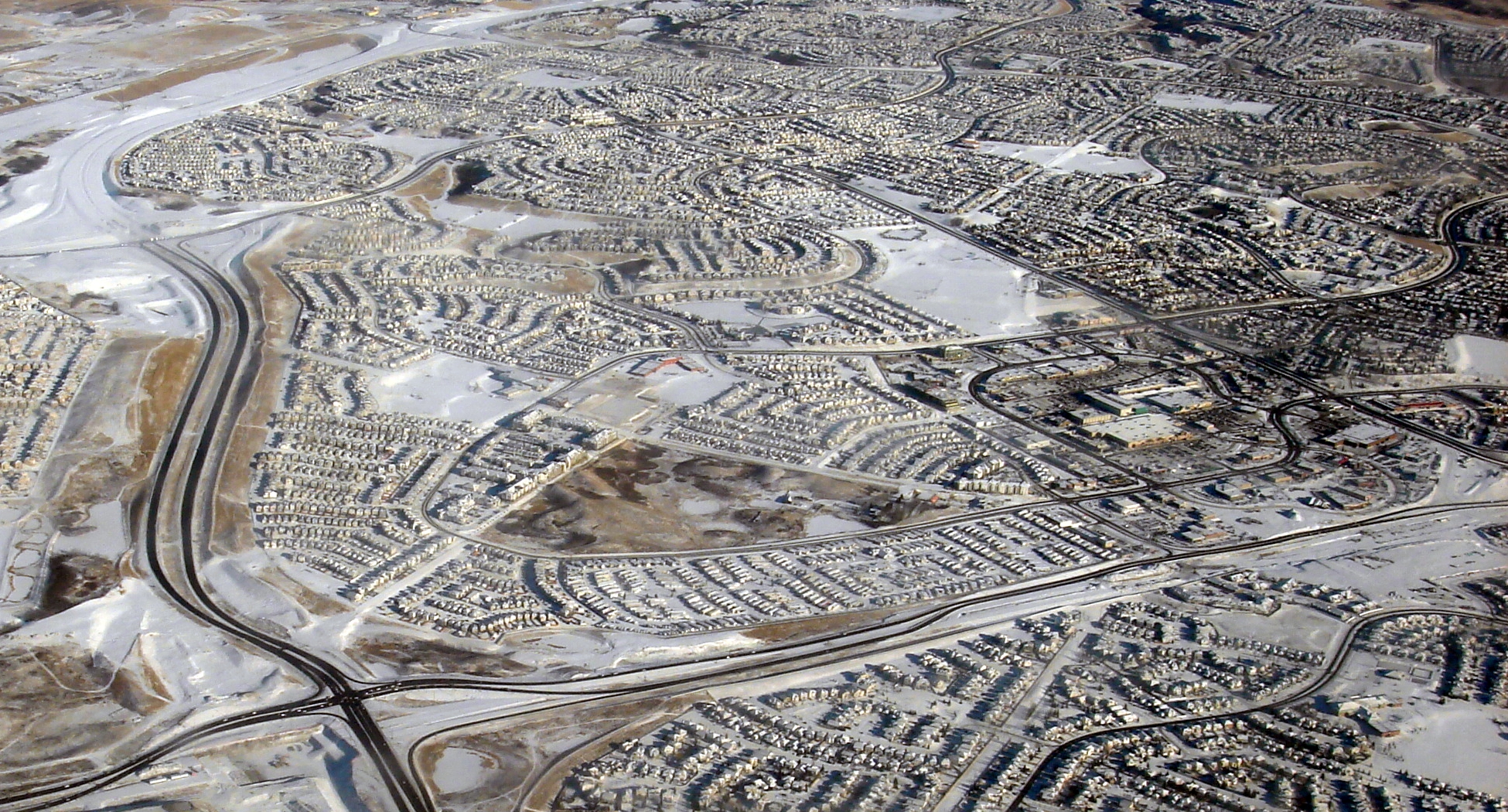
- Aerial view of Arbour Lake

- Location of Arbour Lake in Calgary
- Coordinates: 51°08′00″N 114°12′16″W
- Country: Canada
- Province: Alberta
- City: Calgary
- Quadrant: NW
- Ward: 2
- Established: 1992

Government
  - Mayor: Jeromy Farkas
  - Administrative body: Calgary City Council
  - Councillor: Jennifer Wyness (Independent)

Area
  - Total: 4.2 km^{2} (1.6 sq mi)
- Elevation: 1,215 m (3,986 ft)

Population (2006)
  - Total: 10,592
  - Average Income: $70,590
- Website: Arbour Lake Community Association

Arbour Lake is a residential neighbourhood in the northwest quadrant of Calgary, Alberta. It is bounded to the north by Country Hills Boulevard, to the south by Crowchild Trail, to the east by Nose Hill Drive, to the west by Stoney Trail.

Arbour Lake was established in 1992, and named after Arbor Lake, Newport Beach, California. It is represented in the Calgary City Council by the Ward 2 councillor.

== Demographics ==
In the City of Calgary's 2012 municipal census, Arbour Lake had a population of 10,836 living in 3,918 dwellings, a 0.7% increase from its 2011 population of 10,762. With a land area of 4.4 km^{2} (1.7 sq mi), it had a population density of 2,463/km^{2} (6,380/sq mi) in 2012.

Residents in this community had a median household income of $70,590 in 2000, and there were 7.4% low income residents living in the neighbourhood. As of 2000, 25.1% of the residents were immigrants. A proportion of 8.7% of the buildings were condominiums or apartments, and 4.1% of the housing was used for renting.

== Education ==
This neighbourhood has one public middle school, Arbour Lake Middle School (5-9) and one high school, Robert Thirsk High School (10-12) which opened in September 2013, as well as a Catholic school, St. Ambrose Elementary/Jr. High (K-9).

== See also ==
- List of neighbourhoods in Calgary
