= Highland Park, Calgary =

Highland Park
- Neighbourhood
- Location of Highland Park in Calgary
- Coordinates: 51°05′14″N 114°03′55″W
- Country: Canada
- Province: Alberta
- City: Calgary
- Quadrant: NW
- Ward: 4
- Established: 1946
- Annexed: 1910

Government
  - Mayor: Jeromy Farkas
  - Administrative body: Calgary City Council
  - Councillor: DJ Kelly (The Calgary Party)

Area
  - Total: 1.7 km^{2} (0.66 sq mi)
- Elevation: 1,075 m (3,527 ft)

Population (2006)
  - Total: 3,496
  - Average Income: $37,766
- Website: Highland Park Community Association

Highland Park is a residential neighbourhood in the northwest quadrant of Calgary, Alberta. It is bounded to the north by McKnight Boulevard, to the east by Edmonton Trail, to the south by 32 Avenue N and to the west by 4 Street W. Confederation Park and Nose Hill Park are located in close proximity. The Queens Park Cemetery occupies the southwestern corner of the neighbourhood, and the Highland golf course is developed in the north.

The land was annexed to the City of Calgary in 1910 and Highland Park was established in 1946. It is represented in the Calgary City Council by the Ward 4 councillor.

== Demographics ==
In the City of Calgary's 2012 municipal census, Highland Park had a population of 3,792 living in 2,123 dwellings, a 7.1% increase from its 2011 population of 3,539. With a land area of 1.4 km^{2} (0.54 sq mi), it had a population density of 2,710/km^{2} (7,020/sq mi) in 2012.

Residents in this community had a median household income of $37,766 in 2000, and there were 23.9% low income residents living in the neighbourhood. As of 2000, 13.7% of the residents were immigrants. A proportion of 48.7% of the buildings were condominiums or apartments, and 64% of the housing was used for renting.

Pop. Overtime
Year	Population
2014	4272
2015	4169
2016	4002
2017	4025
2018	4164
2019	3838

== Crime ==
Crime Data
Year	Crime Rate (/100 pop.)
2018	4.3
2019	5.0
2020	4.1
2021	4.5
2022	4.9
2023	3.3

== Queens Park Village ==
Queens Park Village is a small community that borders the Queens Park Cemetery, in the southeast corner of Highland Park.

In the City of Calgary's 2012 municipal census, Queens Park Village had a population of 415 living in 188 dwellings, a 3.8% increase from its 2011 population of 400. With a land area of 0.6 km^{2} (0.23 sq mi), it had a population density of 690/km^{2} (1,790/sq mi) in 2012.

Residents in this community had a median household income of $53,040 in 2000, and there were 20.3% low income residents living in the neighbourhood. Most of the buildings were condominiums or apartments, and 100% of the housing was used for renting.

== Education ==
The community is served by Buchanan Elementary School, Georges P. Vanier Junior High School, and James Fowler High public schools. Buchanan Elementary school enrolls 169 students kindergarten to 6th grade as of 2023. Georges P. Vanier Junior High School enrolls 474 students grades 6 to 9 as of 2023. James Fowler High school enrolls 1332 students from grades 10 to 12 as of 2023.

== See also ==
- List of neighbourhoods in Calgary
