= Winston Heights-Mountview =

Winston Heights Mountview
- Neighbourhood
- Location of Winston Heights and Mountview in Calgary
- Coordinates: 51°04′16″N 114°00′48″W
- Country: Canada
- Province: Alberta
- City: Calgary
- Quadrant: NE
- Ward: 4
- Established: 1932

Government
  - Mayor: Jeromy Farkas
  - Administrative body: Calgary City Council
  - Councillor: DJ Kelly (The Calgary Party)
- Elevation: 1,090 m (3,580 ft)

Population (2006)
  - Total: 3,631
  - Average Income: $41,065
- Website: Winston Heights-Mountview Community Association

Winston Heights/Mountview is a residential neighbourhood in the northeast quadrant of Calgary, Alberta. It is bounded by 32 Avenue to the north, the Nose Creek and Deerfoot Trail to the east, Trans-Canada Highway to the south and Edmonton Trail to the west. Fox Hollow Golf Course and The Winston Golf Club are developed at the eastern edge of the neighbourhood.

It is represented in the Calgary City Council by the Ward 4 councillor.

The neighbourhood was established in 1932 and largely expanded in the 1950s. The community has an area redevelopment plan in place.

== Demographics ==
According to data from the 2016 Census of Canada, compiled by the city of calgary Winston Heights/Mountview had a population of 3,645 living in 1,735 dwellings. With a land area of 3 km^{2} (1.2 sq mi), it had a population density of 1,300/km^{2} (3,400/sq mi) in 2012.

Residents in this community had a median household income of $79,822 in 2016, and there were 10% low income residents living in the neighbourhood. As of 2016, 19% of the residents were immigrants. Among the dwellings in this neighborhood, 37% were single-detached houses, 29% were semi-detached houses, 10% were row houses, and 15% were apartments. A proportion of 61% of the dwellings were owned by the residents while 39% of the housing was used for renting.

Pop. Overtime
Year	Population
2014	3,845
2015	4,035
2016	3,844
2017	3,835
2018	3,744
2019	3,635
2021	3,605

== Crime ==
Crime Data
Year	Crime Rate (/100)
2018	4.5
2019	5.7
2020	4.8
2021	4.1
2022	4.6
2023	3.4

== Education ==
The community is served by Georges P. Vanier Bilingual Junior High and Mount View Elementary public schools.

== See also ==
- List of neighbourhoods in Calgary
