= Huntington Hills, Calgary =

Huntington Hills
- Neighbourhood
- Location of Huntington Hills in Calgary
- Coordinates: 51°07′06″N 114°04′12″W
- Country: Canada
- Province: Alberta
- City: Calgary
- Quadrant: NW/NE
- Ward: 4
- Established: 1967
- Annexed: 1961

Government
  - Administrative body: Calgary City Council

Area
  - Total: 4.4 km^{2} (1.7 sq mi)
- Elevation: 1,100 m (3,600 ft)

Population (2006)
  - Total: 13,739
  - Average Income: $53,168
- Website: Huntington Hills Community Association

Huntington Hills is a residential neighbourhood in the northwest and northeast quadrant of Calgary, Alberta. It is bounded to the north by Beddington Boulevard, to the east by Deerfoot Trail and the Nose Creek, to the south by 64 Avenue N and to the west by the Nose Hill Park and 14 Street W. Centre Street runs through the neighbourhood.

The land was annexed to the City of Calgary in 1961 and Huntington Hills was established in 1967. It is represented in the Calgary City Council by the Ward 4 councillor.

== Demographics ==
In the City of Calgary's 2012 municipal census, Huntington Hills had a population of 13,213 living in 5,580 dwellings, a 0.5% decrease from its 2011 population of 13,279. With a land area of 4.8 km^{2} (1.9 sq mi), it had a population density of 2,753/km^{2} (7,130/sq mi) in 2012.

Residents in this community had a median household income of $53,168 in 2000, and there were 19.5% low income residents living in the neighbourhood. As of 2000, 20.5% of the residents were immigrants. A proportion of 17.3% of the buildings were condominiums or apartments, and 34.2% of the housing was used for renting.

== Crime ==
Crime Data
Year	Crime Rate (/100 pop.)
2018	3.1
2019	2.7
2020	2.0
2021	2.1
2022	2.5
2023	2.0

== Education ==
The community is served by Alex Munro Elementary, Catherine Nichols Gunn Elementary, Dr. J.K. Mulloy Elementary, Huntington Hills Elementary, John G. Diefenbaker High and Sir John A MacDonald Junior High public schools, as well as by St. Helena Junior High School, St. Henry Elementary School and St. Hubert Elementary School (Catholic).

== See also ==
- List of neighbourhoods in Calgary
