= Cambrian Heights, Calgary =

Cambrian Heights
- Neighbourhood
- Location of Cambrian Heights in Calgary
- Coordinates: 51°05′07″N 114°05′22″W
- Country: Canada
- Province: Alberta
- City: Calgary
- Quadrant: NW
- Ward: 7
- Established: 1957
- Annexed: 1910

Government
  - Mayor: Jeromy Farkas
  - Administrative body: Calgary City Council
  - Councillor: Myke Atkinson (Independent)
- Elevation: 1,105 m (3,625 ft)

Population (2013)
  - Total: 2,056
  - Average Income: $59,522
- Website: Cambrian Heights Community Association

Cambrian Heights is a suburban residential neighbourhood in the northwest quadrant of Calgary, Alberta. It is located immediately southeast from Nose Hill Park, east of 14th Street NW and south of John Laurie Boulevard.

== Demographics ==
In the City of Calgary's 2012 municipal census, Cambrian Heights had a population of 2,059 living in 930 dwellings, a 1% increase from its 2011 population of 2,039. With a land area of 0.9 km^{2} (0.35 sq mi), it had a population density of 2,290/km^{2} (5,900/sq mi) in 2012.

Residents in this community had a median household income of $59,522 in 2000, and there were 14.3% low income residents living in the neighbourhood. As of 2000, 12.8% of the residents were immigrants. A proportion of 10.6% of the buildings were condominiums or apartments, and 33.5% of the housing was used for renting.

== See also ==
- List of neighbourhoods in Calgary
