= Highwood, Calgary =

Highwood
- Neighbourhood
- Location of Highwood in Calgary
- Coordinates: 51°05′31″N 114°05′01″W
- Country: Canada
- Province: Alberta
- City: Calgary
- Quadrant: NW
- Ward: 4
- Established: 1954

Government
  - Mayor: Jeromy Farkas
  - Administrative body: Calgary City Council
  - Councillor: DJ Kelly (The Calgary Party)

Area
  - Total: 0.9 km^{2} (0.35 sq mi)
- Elevation: 1,110 m (3,640 ft)

Population (2006)
  - Total: 2,152
  - Average Income: $57,663
- Website: Highwood Community Association

Highwood is a residential neighbourhood in the northwest quadrant of Calgary, Alberta. it is bounded to the north by McKnight Boulevard, to the east by 4 Street W, to the south by 40 Avenue N and to the west by John Laurie Boulevard. Nose Hill Park is located west of the community.

Highwood was established in 1954. It is represented in the Calgary City Council by the Ward 4 councillor.

== Demographics ==
In the City of Calgary's 2012 municipal census, Highwood had a population of 2,214 living in 993 dwellings, a 5.5% increase from its 2011 population of 2,098. With a land area of 0.9 km^{2} (0.35 sq mi), it had a population density of 2,460/km^{2} (6,400/sq mi) in 2012.

Residents in this community had a median household income of $57,663 in 2000, and there were 7.3% low income residents living in the neighbourhood. As of 2000, 15.2% of the residents were immigrants. A proportion of 20.3% of the buildings were condominiums or apartments, and 30.1% of the housing was used for renting.

== Crime ==
Crime Data
Year	Crime Rate (/100 pop.)
2018	4.8
2019	3.4
2020	3.1
2021	3.5
2022	5.0
2023	2.4

== Education ==
The community is served by Colonel Irvine Junior High (public English 7-9 and Mandarin bilingual 5-9) and Highwood Elementary (Mandarin bilingual K-4) public schools.

== See also ==
- List of neighbourhoods in Calgary
