= Thorncliffe, Calgary =

Thorncliffe
- Neighbourhood
- Location of Thorncliffe in Calgary
- Coordinates: 51°06′08″N 114°04′01″W
- Country: Canada
- Province: Alberta
- City: Calgary
- Quadrant: NW/NE
- Ward: 4
- Established: 1954

Government
  - Mayor: Jeromy Farkas
  - Administrative body: Calgary City Council
  - Councillor: DJ Kelly (The Calgary Party)

Area
  - Total: 3.27 km^{2} (1.26 sq mi)
- Elevation: 1,085 m (3,560 ft)

Population (2006)
  - Total: 8,862
  - Density: 2,710.1/km^{2} (7,019/sq mi)
  - Average Income: $50,009
- Website: Thorncliffe Community Association

Thorncliffe is a residential neighbourhood in the northwest and northeast quadrants of Calgary, Alberta. It is bounded by 64 Avenue to the north, Deerfoot Trail to the east, McKnight Boulevard to the south and 14 Street West and Nose Hill Park to the west.

Thorncliffe was established in 1954. It is represented in the Calgary City Council by the Ward 4 councillor.

== Demographics ==
In the City of Calgary's 2012 municipal census, Thorncliffe had a population of 8,693 living in 3,858 dwellings, a 0.6% increase from its 2011 population of 8,640. With a land area of 3.3 km^{2} (1.3 sq mi), it had a population density of 2,630/km^{2} (6,820/sq mi) in 2012.

Residents in this community had a median household income of $50,009 in 2000, and there were 20.8% low income residents living in the neighbourhood. As of 2000, 18.8% of the residents were immigrants. A proportion of 13.8% of the buildings were condominiums or apartments, and 34% of the housing was used for renting.

Pop. Overtime
Year	Population
2014	8839
2015	8931
2016	8851
2017	8474
2018	8849
2019	8788
2021	8695

== Crime ==
Year	Crime Rate (/100 pop.)
2018	3.4
2019	3.0
2020	3.1
2021	2.6
2022	2.7
2023	2.5

== Education ==
The community is served by Colonel Sanders Elementary and Thorncliffe Elementary public school, as well as by Corpus Christi Elementary School (Catholic).

== See also ==
- List of neighbourhoods in Calgary
