= Bow River pathway =

The Bow River pathway is a formal pathway system developed along both banks of the Bow River in the city of Calgary.

The Bow River pathway follows the Bow River from west to east, then north to south

The pathway is used for cycling, walking, jogging, rollerblading, and skateboarding. It connects to a system of pathways that extend along the Elbow River, Glenmore Reservoir, Nose Creek, and other areas of the city.

The pathway extends about 48 kilometres (30 mi) from the Valley Ridge community to Fish Creek Provincial Park, connecting major parks and natural areas.

Construction of the Bow River Pathways started in 1975 to mark the city's centenary. The first part was dedicated on June 25, 1977. Since then, it has been developed to its present extent. The project was funded by the City of Calgary and the Devonian Group of Charitable Foundations.

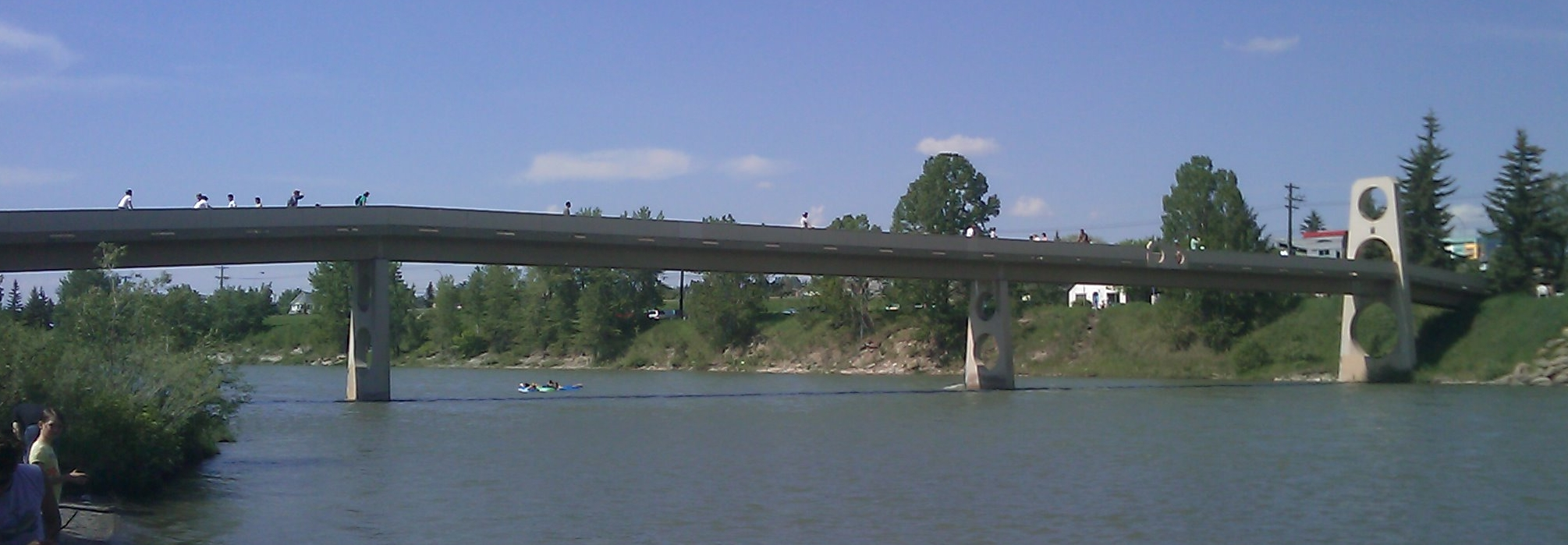
The pathway crosses the Bow River in Edworthy Park on the Harry Boothman Bridge

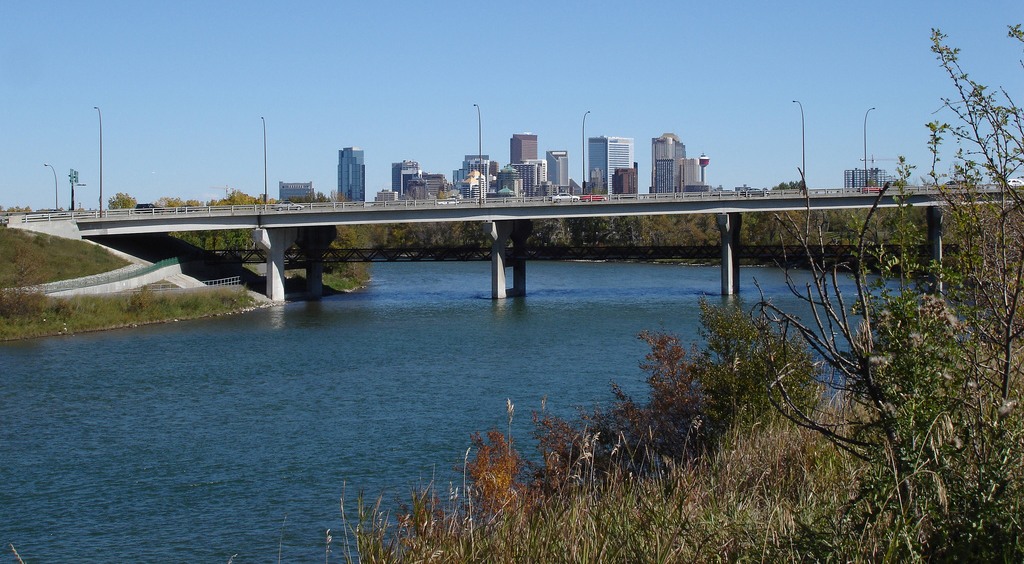
The pathway is integrated with Crowchild Trail bridge

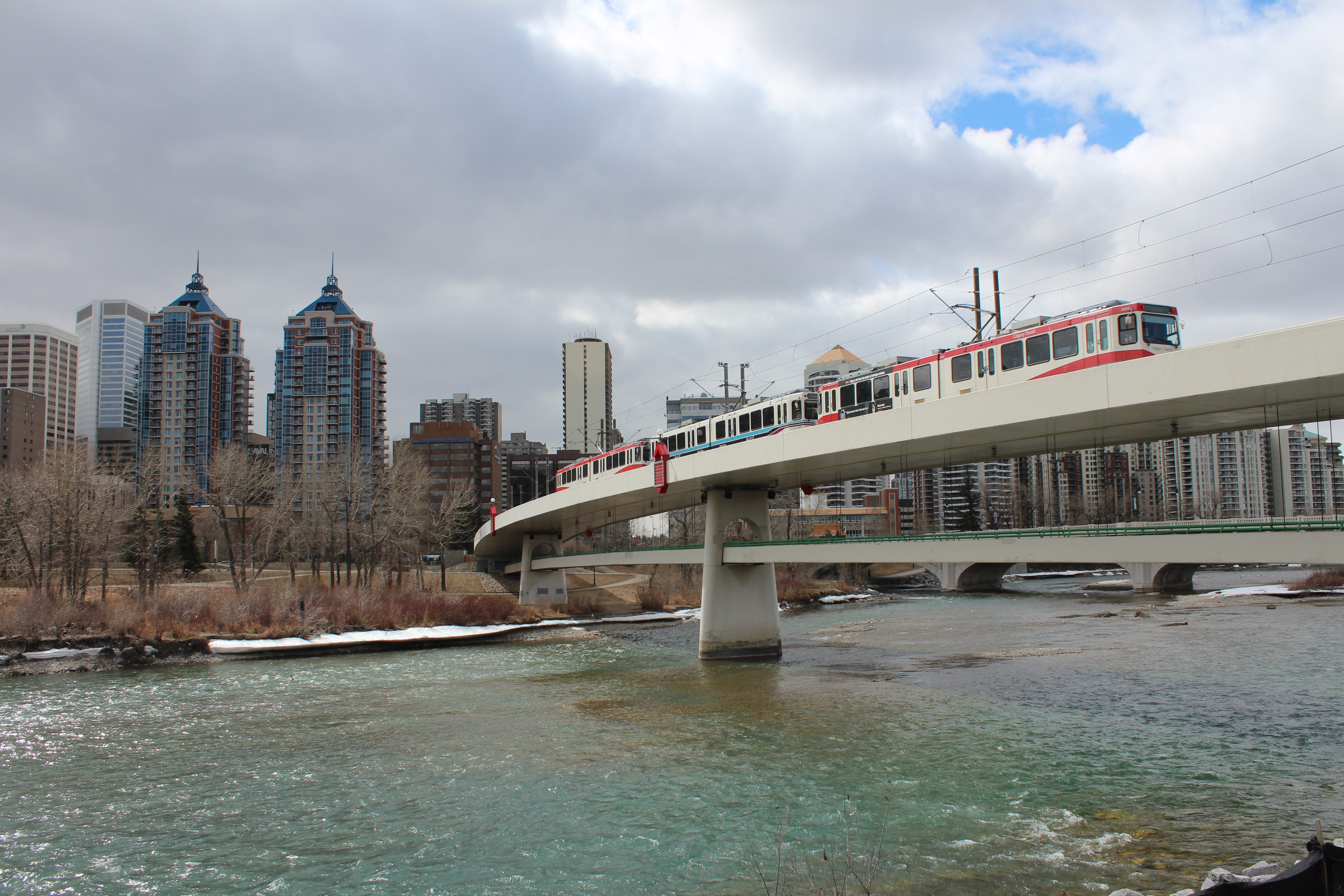
Two-level bridge across the Bow River near Downtown West End, with C-Train light rail on the upper level and pathway on the lower level.

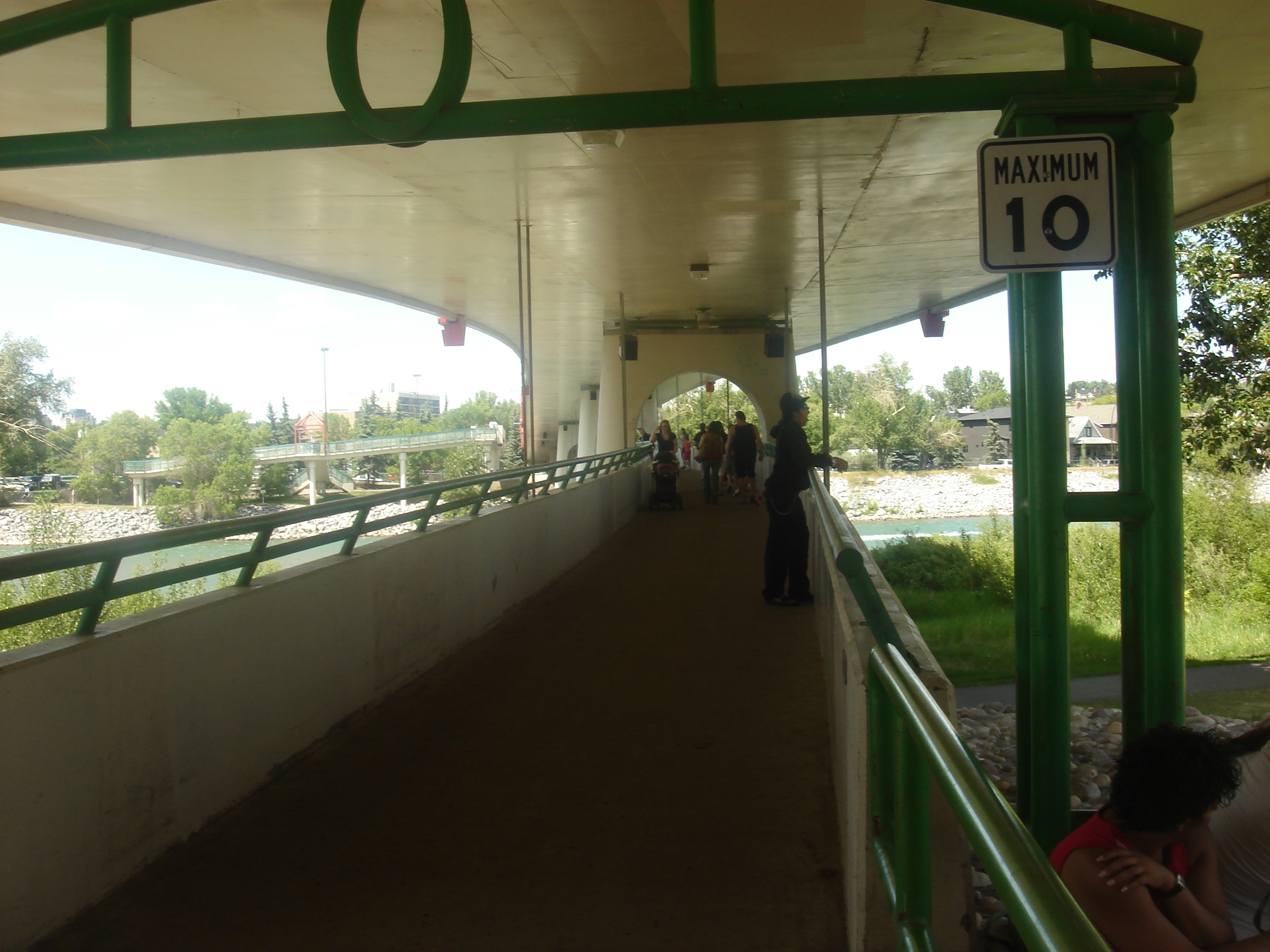
Crossing the river beneath the C-Train bridge

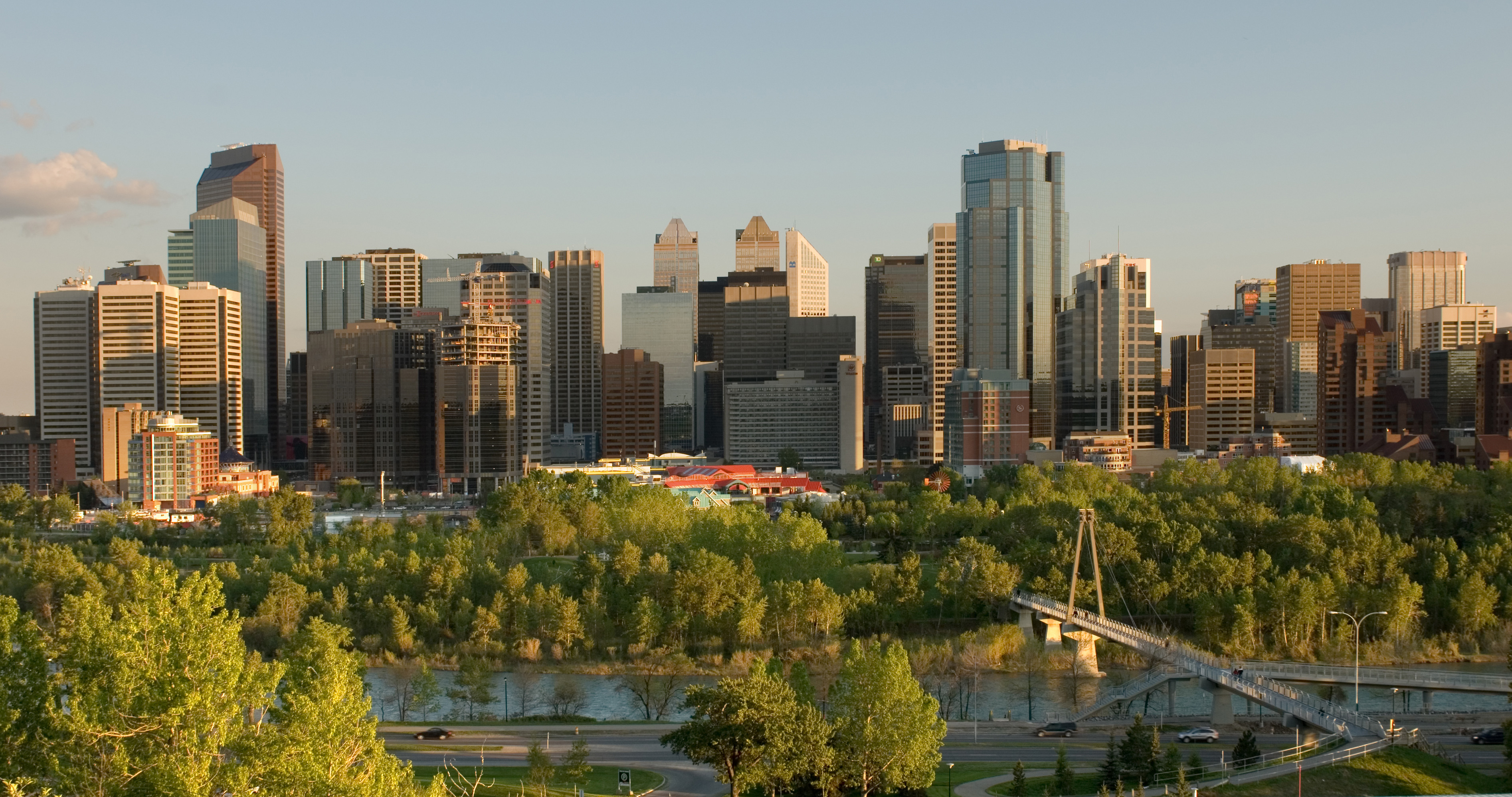
Pedestrian bridge to Prince's Island Park

== Recreation areas ==
Recreation areas connected by the pathway include:

Recreation area	Type	Location	Remarks
Valley Ridge Golf Course	Golf Course	Right bank 51.10067°N 114.23650°W	
Bowness Park	City park	right bank 51.09810°N 114.22005°W	
Baker Park	City park	left bank 51.10080°N 114.22101°W	
Bowmont Park	City Park	left bank 51.09870°N 114.19086°W	
Shouldice Park	City park	left bank 51.07259°N 114.17254°W	
Edworthy Park	City park	right bank 51.06236°N 114.15829°W	
Douglas Fir Trail	City Park	left bank 51.05426°N 114.14297°W	
Lawrey Gardens	City Park	right bank 51.052222°N 114.128056°W	Often erroneously referred to as "Lowrey Gardens". Location appears as a dog park in OpenStreet Map.
Nat Christie Park	City Park	right bank 51.047581°N 114.093747°W	
Shaganappi Point Golf Course	Golf Course	right bank 51.04546°N 114.12670°W	
Broadview Park	City park	left bank 51.04985°N 114.10706°W	
Shaw Millennium Park	Skatepark	right bank 51.04601°N 114.09211°W	
Centenary Park	City Park	St. Patrick's Island 51.048221°N 114.045956°W	
Eau Claire Park	City park	right bank 51.05209°N 114.08045°W	
Prince's Island Park	City park	on Prince's Island; 51.05573°N 114.07017°W	
Crescent Heights Pathway and Park	City Park	right bank 51.057910°N 114.064758°W	
Sunnyside Park	City park	left bank 51.05823°N 114.06748°W	in south-east Sunnyside
Sien Lok Park	City park	right bank 51.05328°N 114.06518°W	part of Chinatown
Bow River Park	City park	left bank 51.05420°N 114.06152°W	
Fort Calgary	Historic park, museum	right bank 51.04536°N 114.04553°W	part of East Village, connects with Elbow River pathway
Calgary Zoo	Zoo	St George's Island; 51.04540°N 114.03409°W	Zoo extends on left bank
Pearce Estate	City park, nature reserve	right bank 51.04121°N 114.01413°W	
Inglewood Golf and Country Club	Golf Course	left bank 51.03360°N 114.00369°W	
Inglewood Bird Sanctuary	Nature reserve	right bank 51.02807°N 114.00668°W	Access to Bow Habitat Station, Inglewood Wildlands Park, and the Sam Livingston Fish Hatchery
Old Refinery Park	City park	left bank 51.00568°N 114.01712°W	
Beaverdam Flats	City Park	right bank 50.99919°N 114.02380°W	aka "Beaver Dam Flats"
Southland Park	City park	left bank 50.97493°N 114.03332°W	
Carburn Park	City park	left bank 50.974538°N 114.032740°W	
Douglasbank Park	City park	left bank 50.94173°N 114.01006°W	
Fish Creek Provincial Park	Provincial park	right bank 50.90909°N 114.01252°W	
McKenzie Meadows Golf Club	Golf course	left bank 50.90614°N 114.00469°W	
Sikome Lake	Man-made lake	right bank 50.89784°N 114.01574°W	

== See also ==
- List of attractions and landmarks in Calgary
