= List of parks in Calgary =

List of parks located within Calgary, Alberta

The following list of the parks in Calgary includes recreational greenspaces within the city limits that are maintained by either Calgary's municipal government or the government of Alberta. The municipal government maintains 75 urban parks and gardens, while the provincial government maintains one urban park.

== Municipal parks ==
The following parks are maintained by the City of Calgary:

=== Downtown Area ===
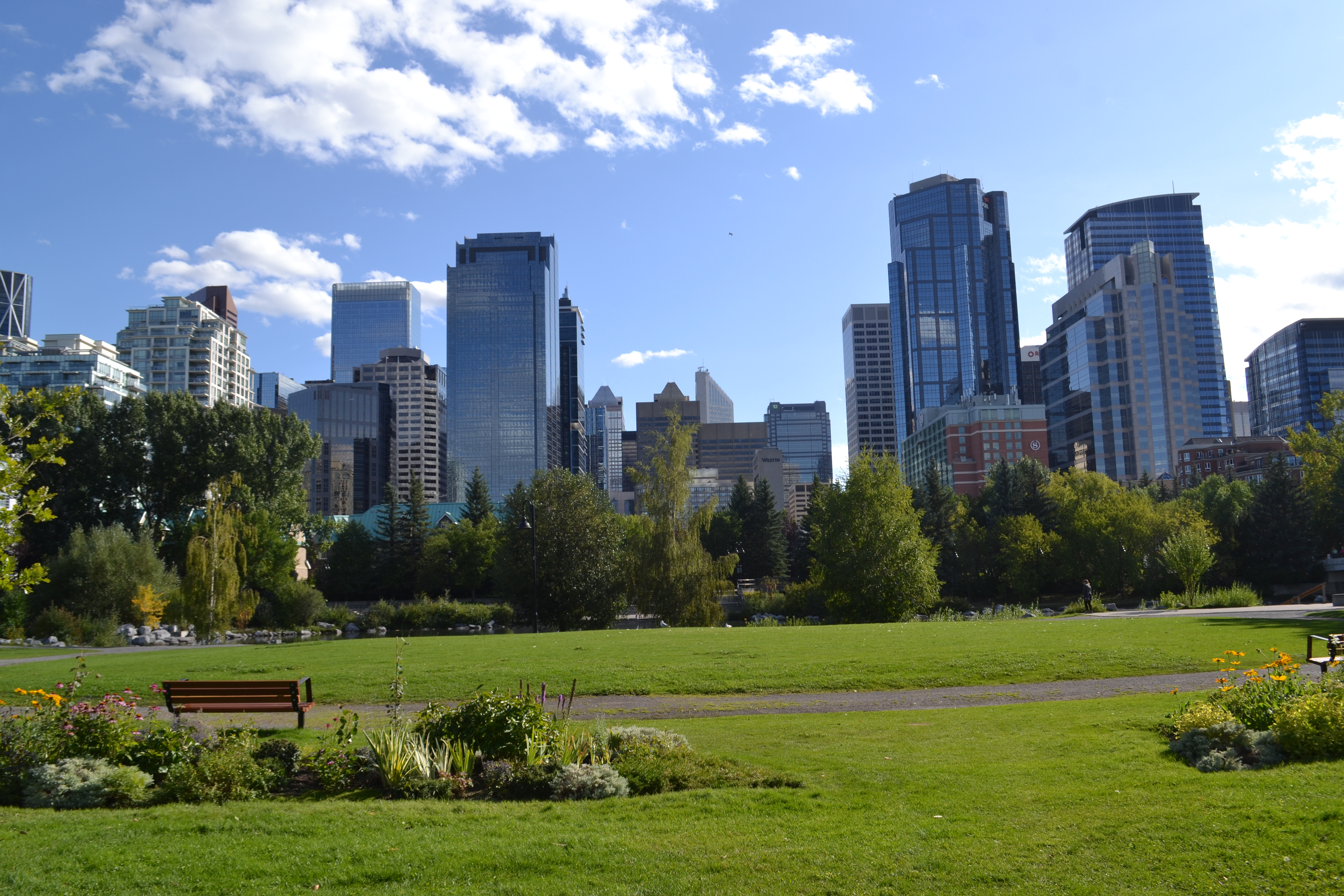
Downtown Calgary seen from Prince's Island Park

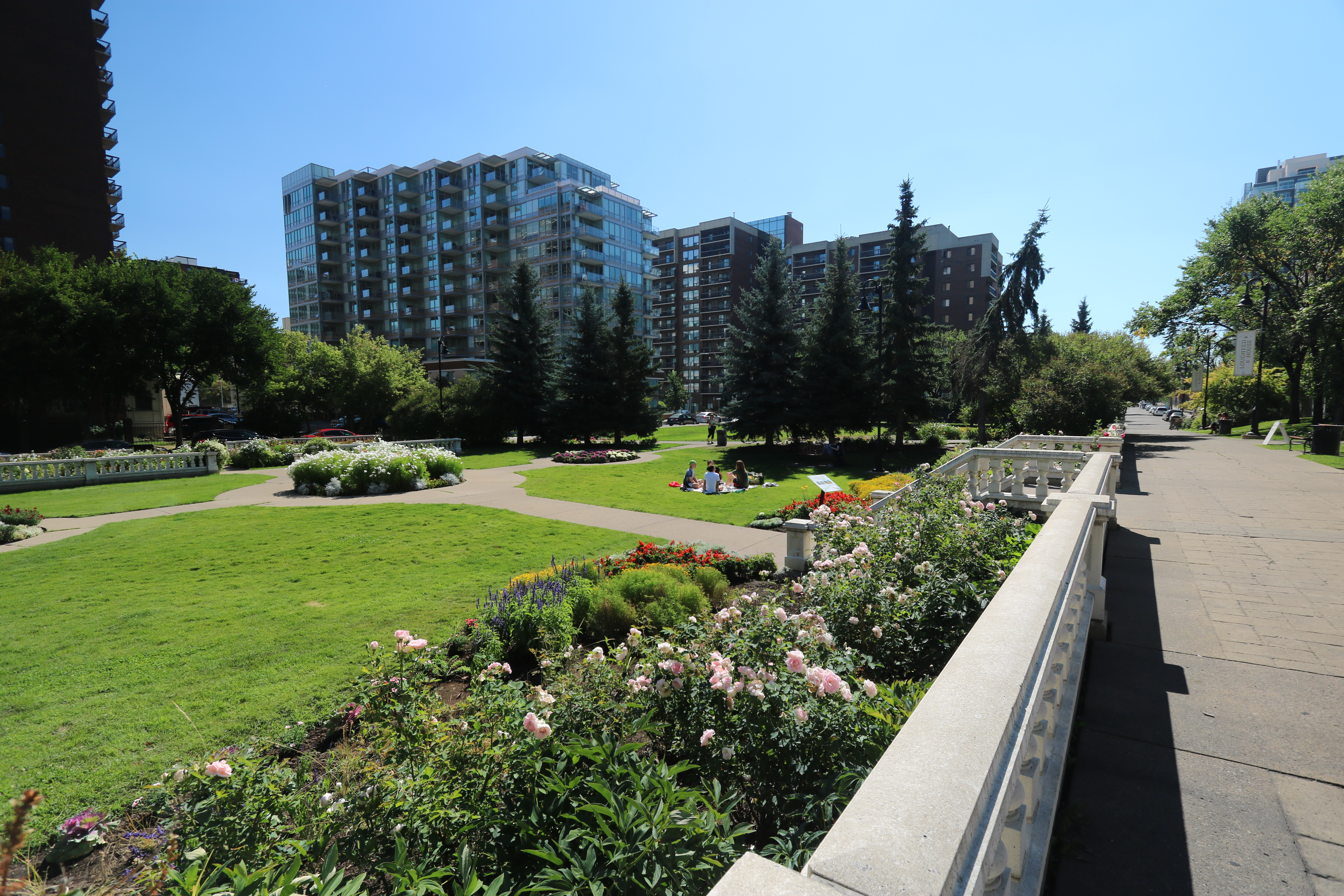
Beaulieu Gardens at the Lougheed House

- Barb Scott Park
- Beaulieu Gardens
- Bow to Bluff
- Central Memorial Park
- Century Gardens
- Connaught Park
- Devonian Gardens
- Eau Claire Plaza
- Haultain Park
- Humpy Hollow
- Harmony Park
- Lois Szabo Commons
- Nat Christie Park
- Olympic Plaza
- Peacekeeper Park
- Poetic Park
- Prince's Island Park
- Rouleauville Square
- Millenium Park
- Sien Lok Park
- St. Patrick's Island Park
- Thomson Family Park
- Tomkins Park

=== Northwest ===
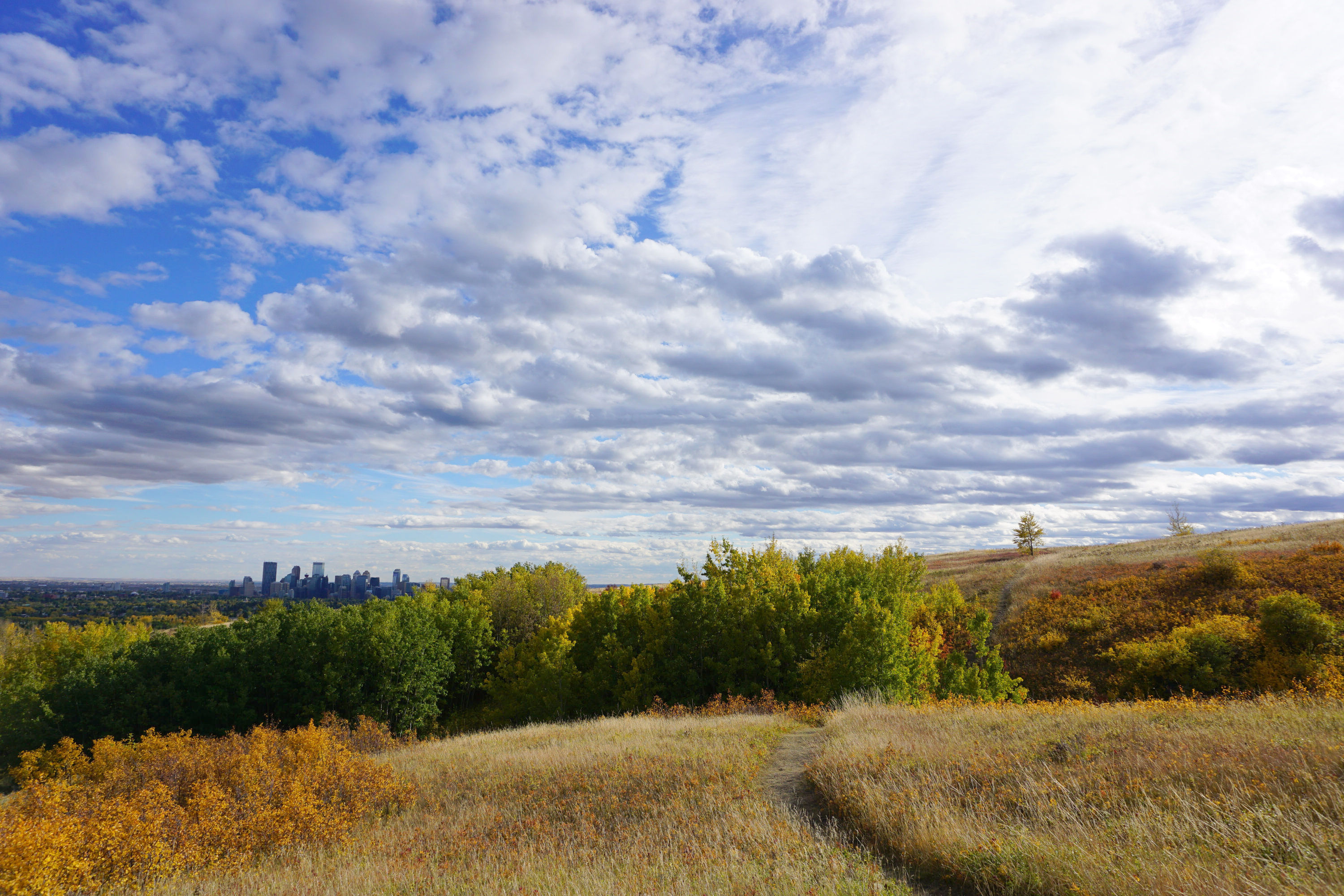
Nose Hill Park

- 12 Mile Coulee
- Baker Park
- Bowmont Park
- Bowness Park
- West Confederation Park
- Confederation Park
- Crescent Park
- Dale Hodges Park
- Edgemont Ravine
- McHugh Bluff
- Nose Hill Park
- Poppy Plaza
- Ranchlands Park
- Riley Park
- Shouldice Park

=== Northeast ===
- Big Marlborough Park
- Bottomlands Park
- Laycock Park
- Munro Park
- Prairie Winds Park
- Rotary Park
- Tom Campbell's Hill
- West Nose Creek/Confluence Park

=== Southwest ===
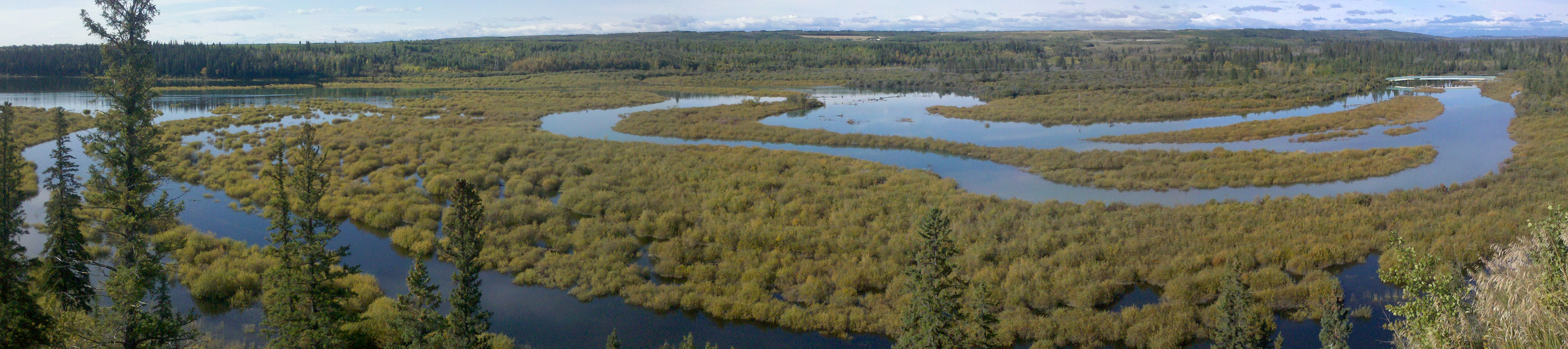
Weaselhead Flats, seen from North Glenmore Park

- Battalion Park
- Bridlewood Wetlands
- Clearwater Park
- Douglas Fir Trail
- Edworthy Park
- Griffith Woods
- J.H. Woods Park
- Lawrey Gardens
- North Glenmore Park
- River Park
- Sandy Beach
- South Glenmore Park
- Stanley Park
- Strathcona Ravine
- Weaselhead Flats

=== Southeast ===
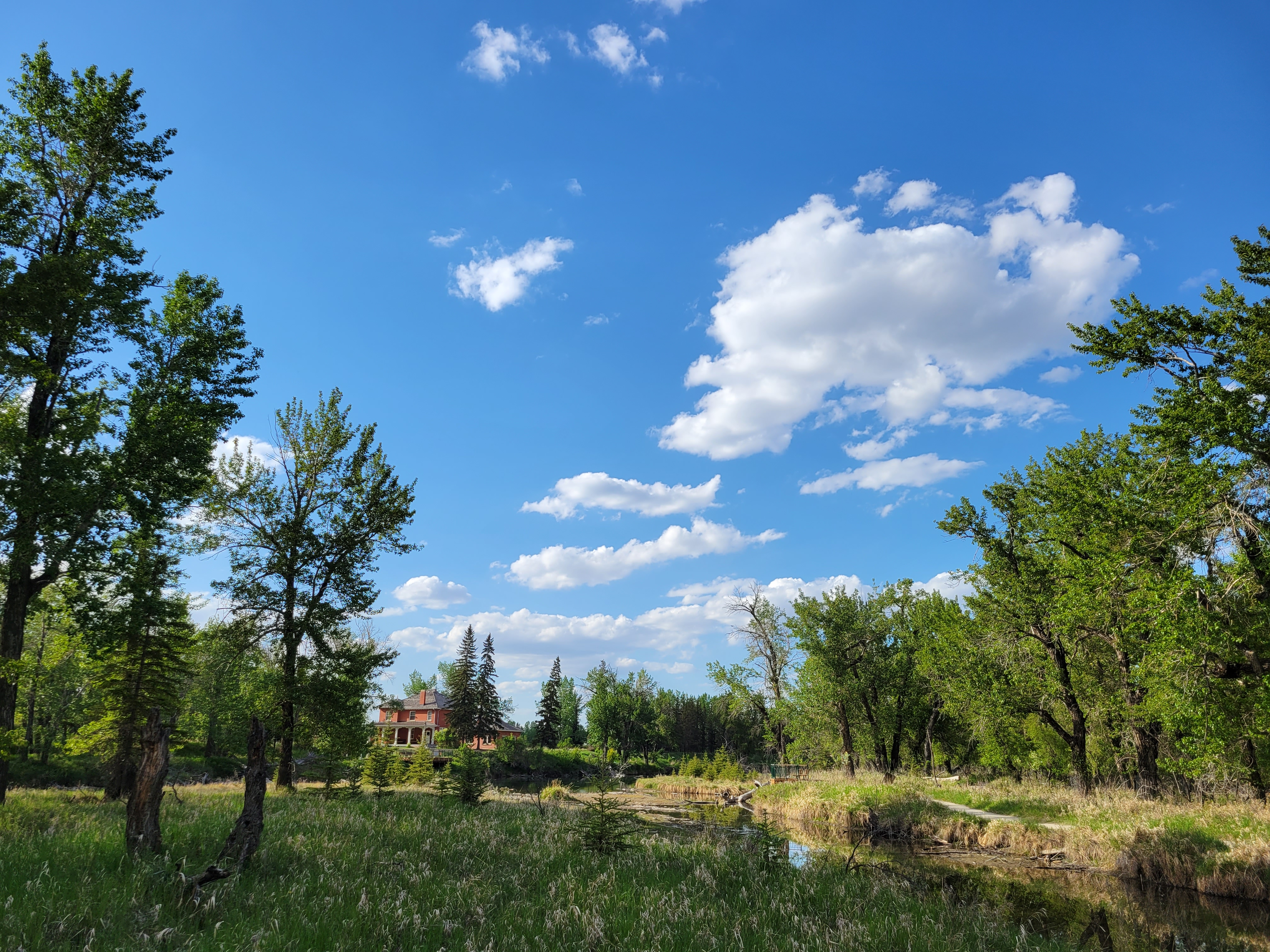
Inglewood Bird Sanctuary

- Beaverdam Flats
- Carburn Park
- Elliston Park
- Inglewood Bird Sanctuary
- Jack Long Park
- Lindsay Park
- Mills Park
- Old Refinery Park
- Pearce Estate Park
- Ralph Klein Park
- Reader Rock Garden
- Sue Higgins Park
- Valleyview Park

== Provincial parks ==
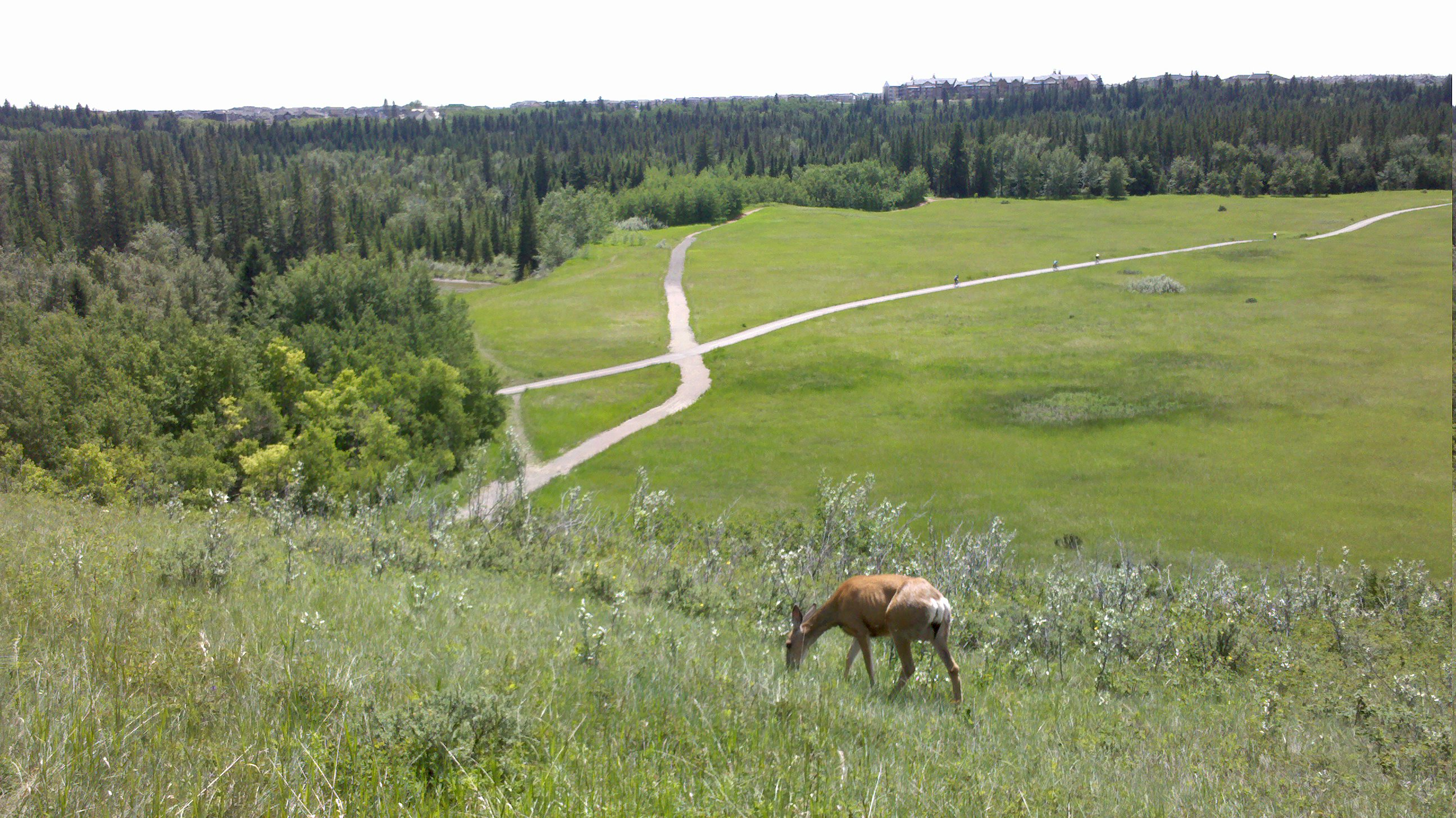
Fish Creek Provincial Park

Fish Creek Provincial Park is a provincial park which sits entirely within the city limits of Calgary.

== See also ==
- Geography of Calgary
- List of tourist attractions in Calgary
