= Carburn Park =

Park in Calgary, Alberta

Caburn Park
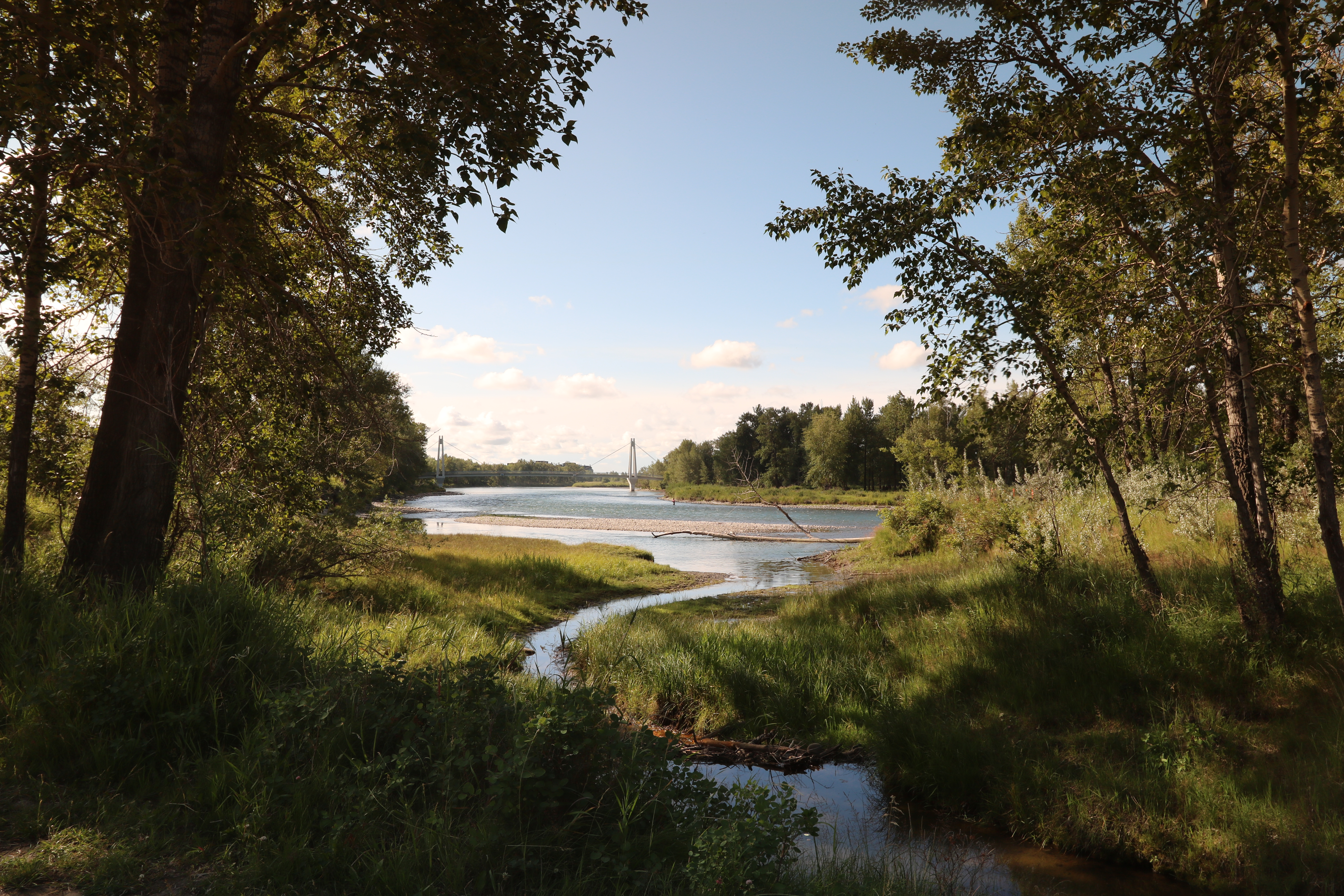
- The Bow River from Carburn Park, with the Eric Harvie Bridge in the background

- Location within Calgary
- Interactive map of Caburn Park
- Type: Urban park
- Location: Calgary, Alberta
- Coordinates: 50°58′28″N 114°01′54″W
- Area: 135 hectares (1.35 km^{2})
- Created: 1986
- Operator: City of Calgary
- Open: Year round

Carburn Park is a city park located in southeast Calgary, Alberta, along the Bow River adjacent to Sue Higgins Park. It is named after Carburn Aggregates, the company that developed the park. It is a popular site for recreation year-round and is also an important area for wildlife. The ponds in the park are stocked annually with trout by Alberta Fish and Wildlife.

== Description ==
The park is located on a bend in the Bow River, with two man-made ponds in the middle, one featuring an island. It's mostly covered in deciduous forest, with some open meadows and a large gravel bank on the western shore. The Bow River Pathway crosses through the park and connects with Sue Higgins Park via the Eric Harvie Bridge.

== Facilities and activities ==
The park has picnic tables with barbecue pits, public washrooms, and a large firepit that is stoked during the winter. Popular summer activities in the park include fishing, paddleboarding, kayaking, and canoeing. During the winter, the smaller pond is turned into a rink for ice skating. Year-round activities include dog-walking and birdwatching. Swimming is not allowed, and dogs must be kept on a leash.

== History ==
The land that the park is on now used to belong to Senator Patrick Burns. It was purchased by a gravel mining company, Caburn Aggregates in 1959. The land was mined for gravel from 1973 until the mid-1980s. In 1982, in an agreement between the company and the municipal government, it was decided that Carburn Aggregates would mine a 9 hectare area of the land, and in return, they would help develop the area into a park featuring two ponds in the middle. Final approval for the park was granted by Calgary's Park and Recreation Department on November 29, 1982.

== Ecology ==
Over 200 species of birds have been recorded in the park. The park is home to many species of waterfowl including Common goldeneye, Redhead, Bufflehead, Harlequin duck, and Tundra swan. Common birds in the park include Black-capped chickadee, Brown creeper, Hairy woodpecker, Great horned owl, Bald eagle, and White-breasted nuthatch. Mammals in the park include White-tailed deer, North American porcupine, Eastern grey squirrel, Muskrat, and Coyote. The forests in the park are mainly Balsam poplar, as well as some Trembling aspen and Water birch. Common shrubs in the park include Choke cherry, Saskatoon, and Red osier dogwood.

== Gallery ==
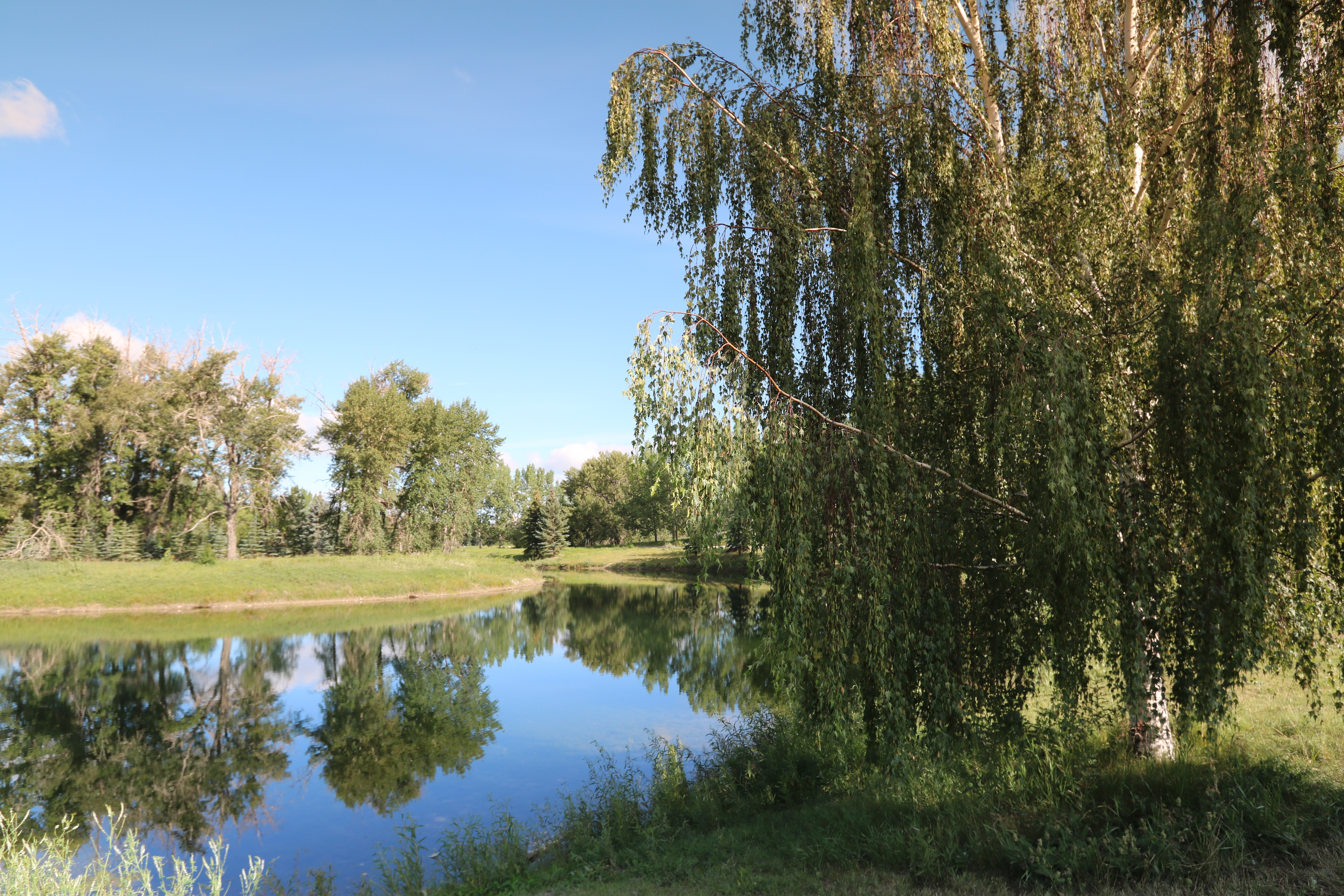
View of first pond, with the island on the left

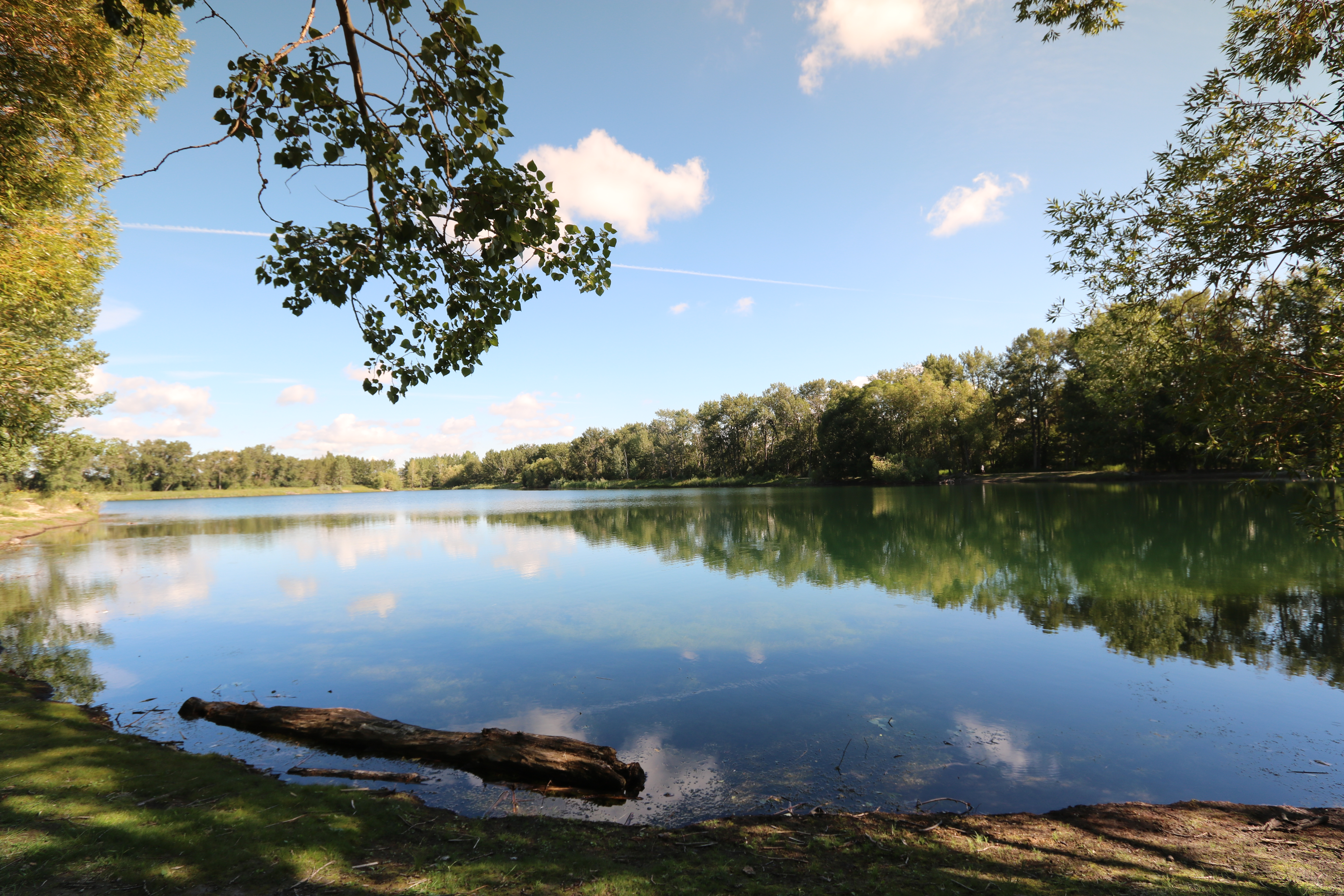
View of the second pond

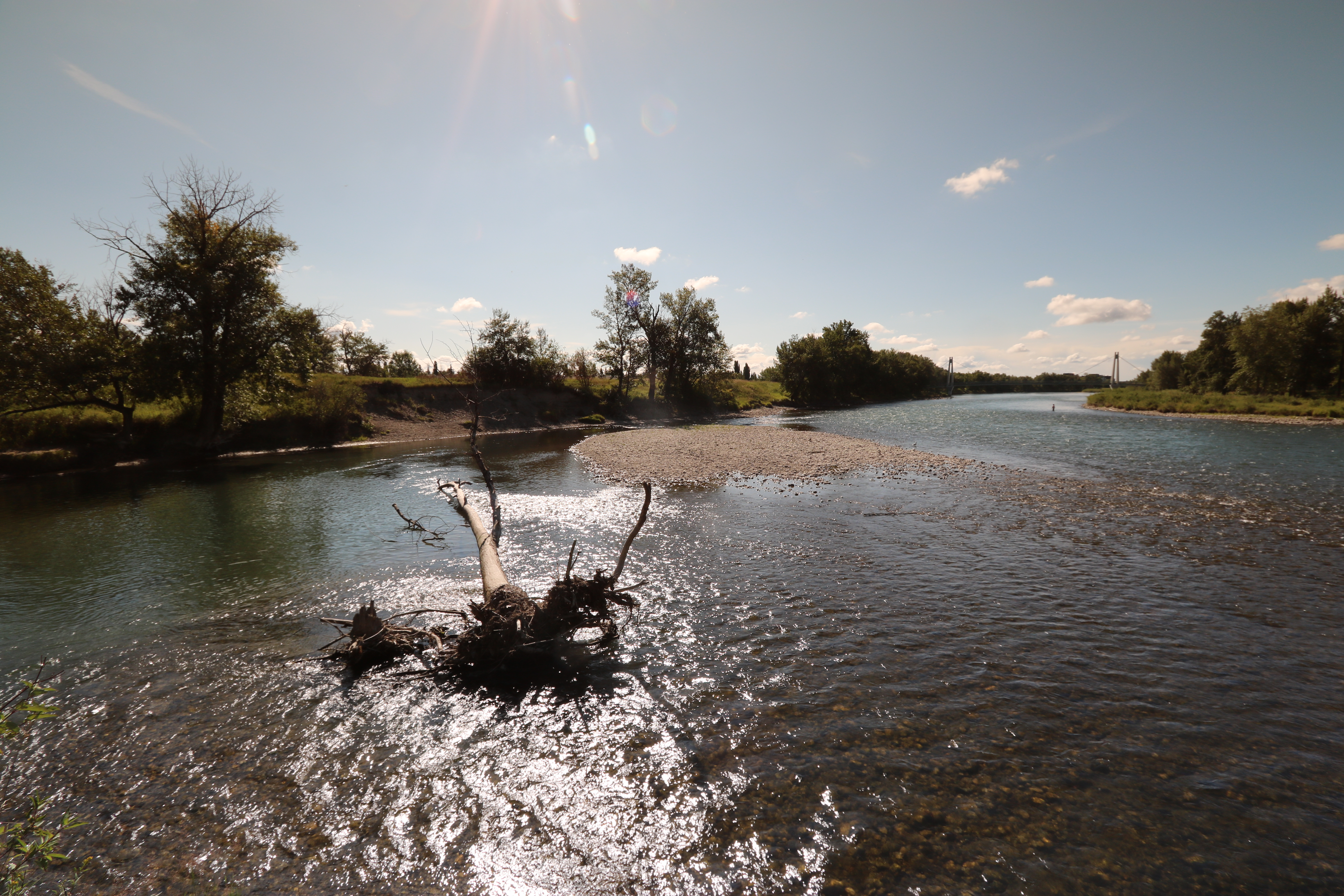
View of the Bow River

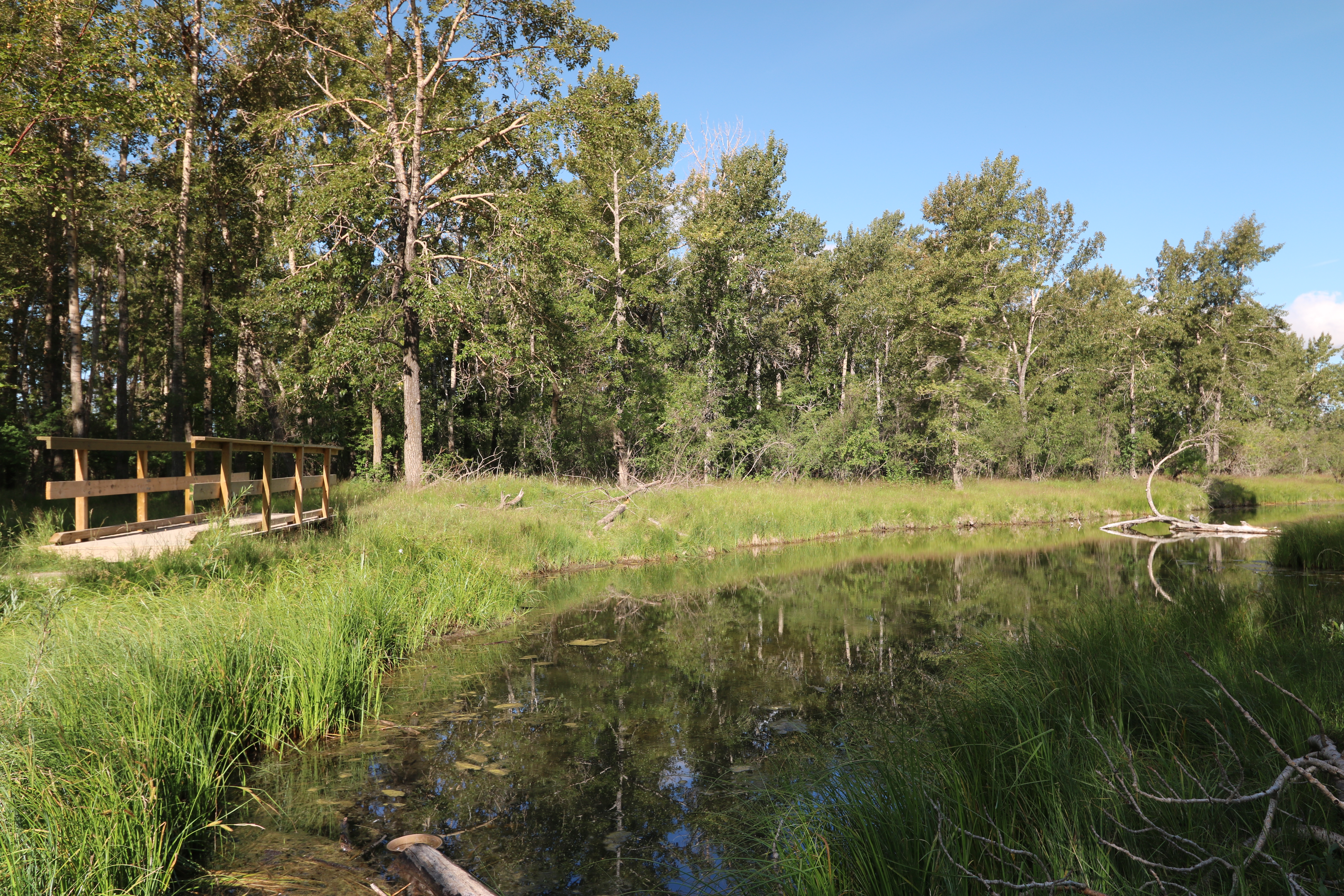
View of one of the wetlands in the park

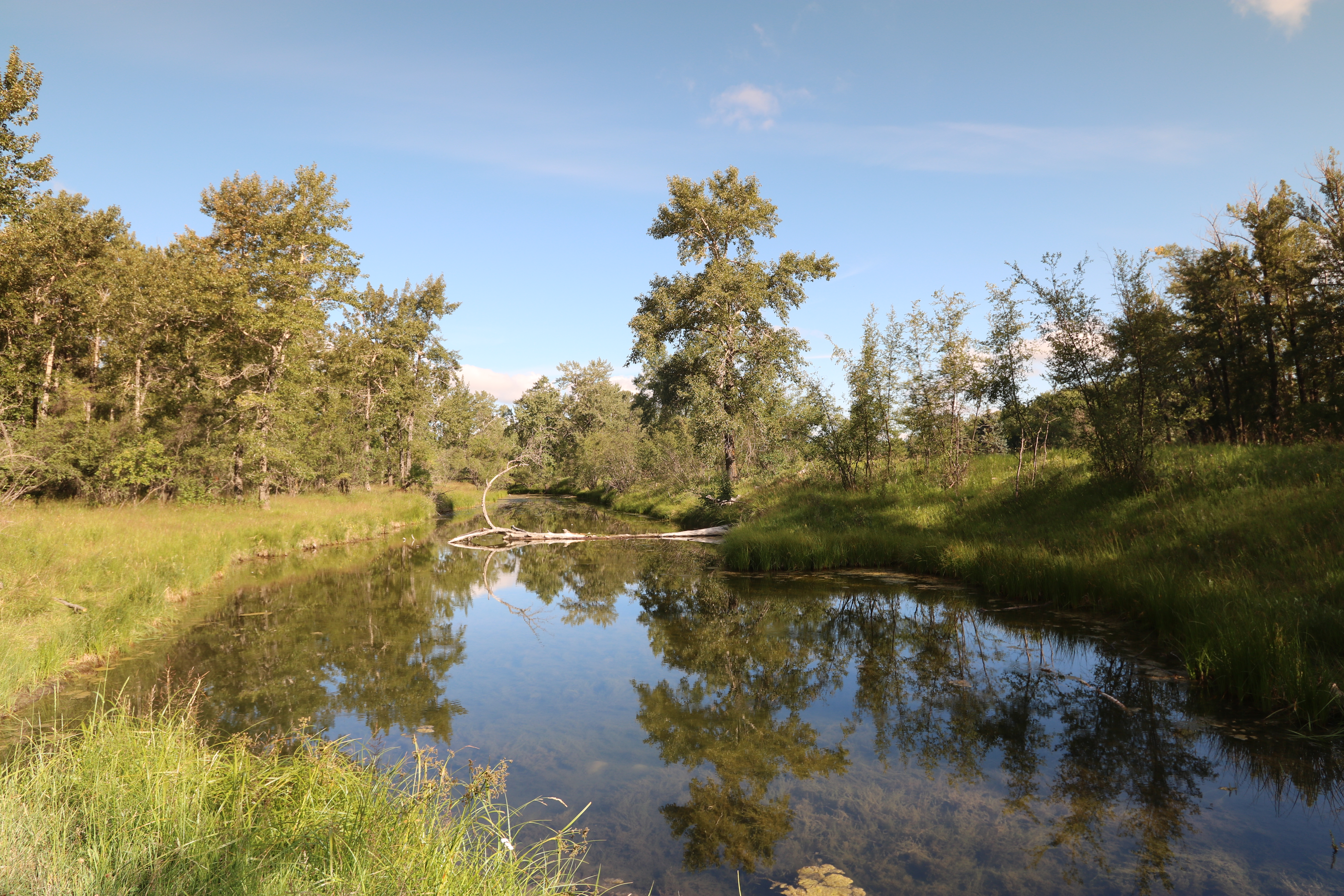
One of the trails in the park

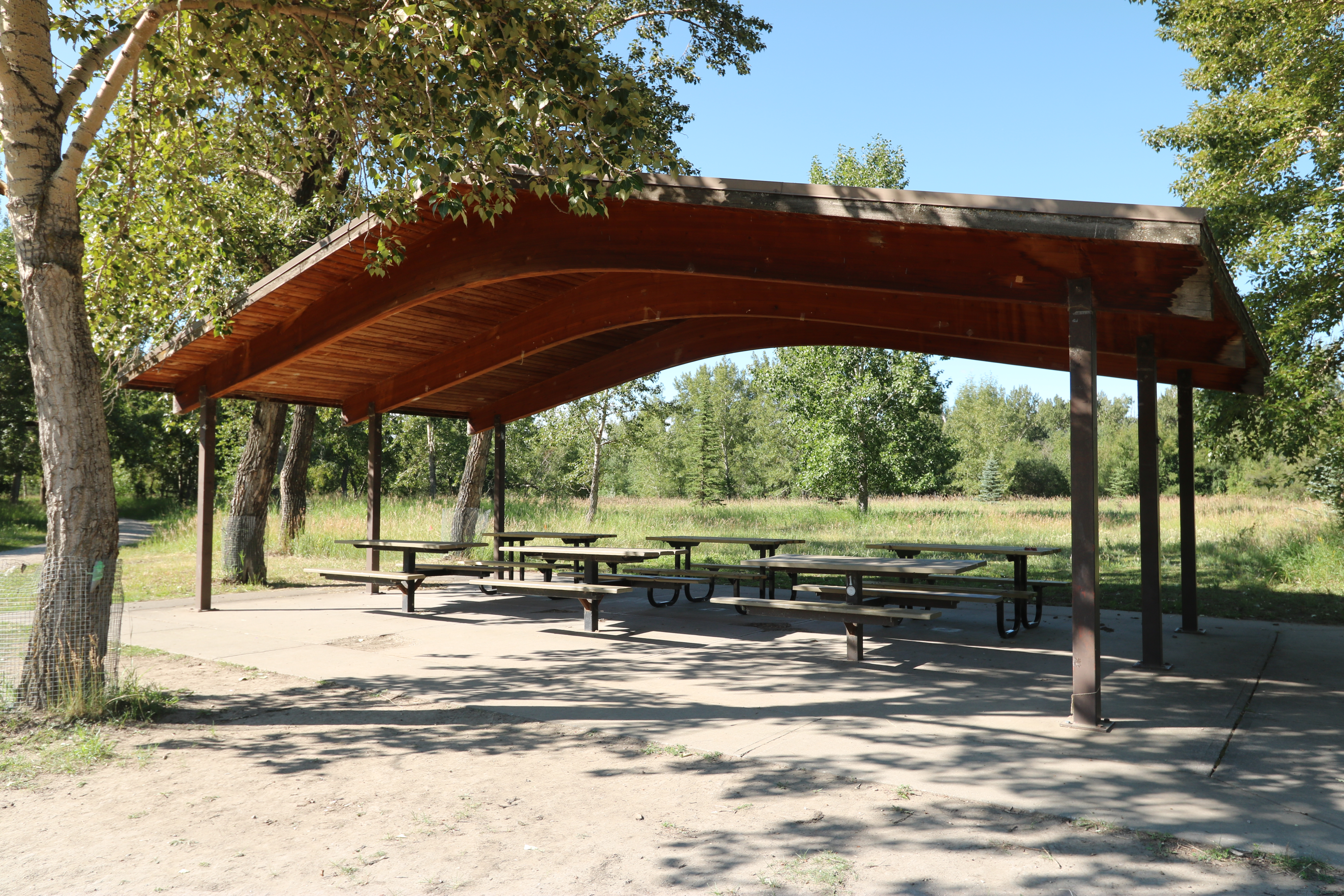
View of the picnic shelter in the middle of the park

== See also ==
- List of attractions and landmarks in Calgary
- List of protected areas of Alberta
- List of parks in Calgary
