= Weaselhead Flats Natural Environment Park =

Park in Calgary, Alberta

Weaselhead Flats
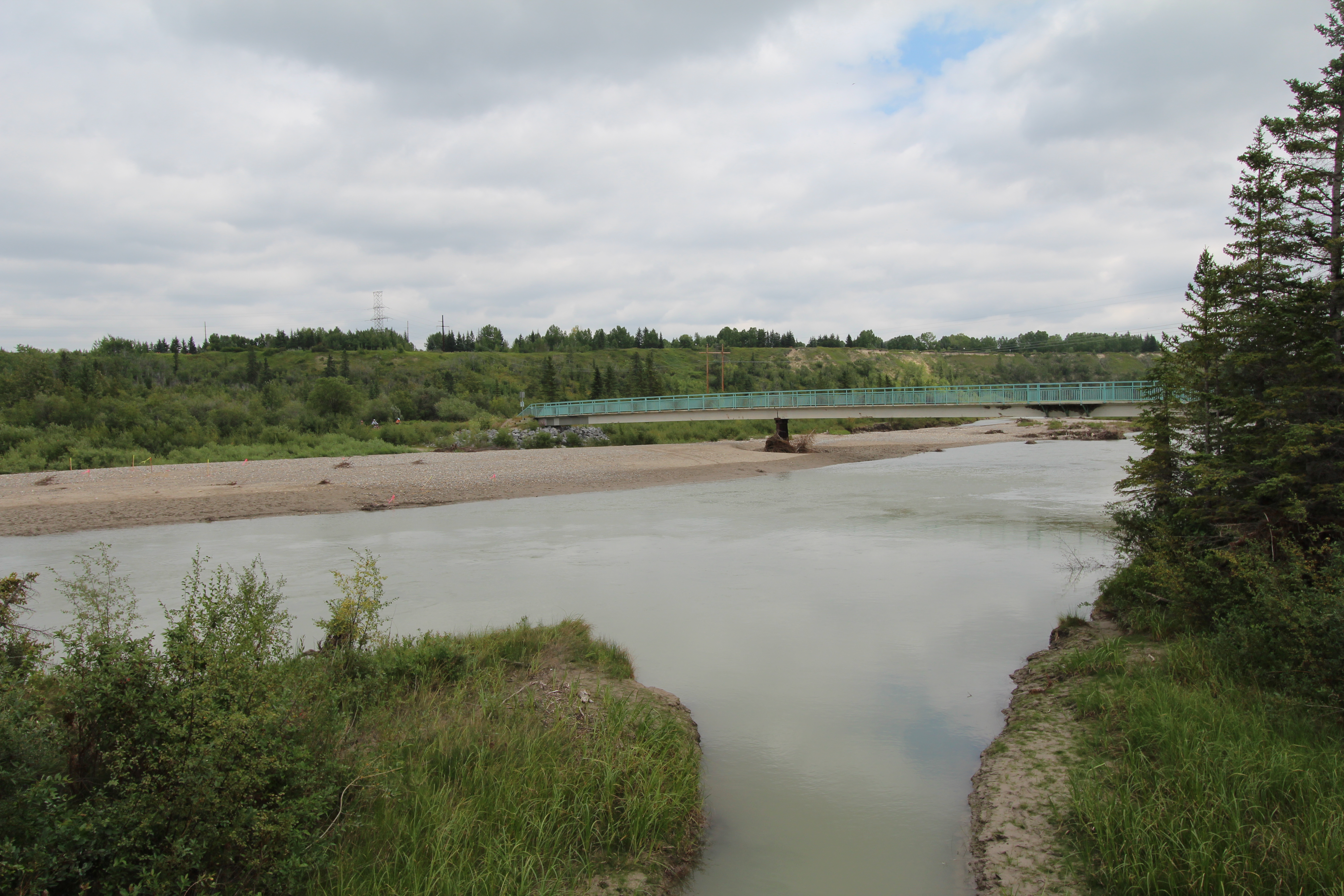
- The Barry Erskine Bridge over the Elbow River

- Location within Calgary
- Type: Urban park
- Location: Calgary, Alberta
- Coordinates: 50°59′27″N 114°09′22″W
- Area: 237 hectares (2.37 km^{2})
- Created: ca. 1980
- Operator: City of Calgary
- Open: Year round

Weaselhead Flats Natural Environment Park, also known simply as Weaselhead, is a city park and natural area in southwest Calgary, Alberta, Canada. It is a popular recreation area and is well known for its abundance of plants and animals.

== Description ==
Weaselhead Flats is located on a delta in the Elbow River just west of the Glenmore Reservoir. It features multiple oxbow lakes and a large area of wetlands. It has a large area of trails throughout it, both paved and unpaved. The parking lot is on top of a steep hill, with the Glenmore Pathway going down and over the Elbow River and through the park. The park borders Tsuu T'ina Nation 145 to the north, Stoney Trail to the west, and North and South Glenmore Park to the East.

== Facilities & activities ==
There are no public washrooms due to the contamination risk it could pose to Calgary's water supply. Instead, there are portable toilets in the parking lot. All other facilities and amenities are located in North and South Glenmore Park. The park has a small gravel beach by the pedestrian bridge, as well as a clothing-optional beach accessed by a trail off the main path down the hill from the parking lot. Activities in the park include biking, birdwatching, cross-country skiing, and dog-walking.

== History ==
The origins of the name Weaselhead is believed to have come from the name of the Tsuu T'ina chief at the time of European contact. In 1877, Treaty 7 was signed, which made the area part of Tsuu T'ina 145. The first recorded use of the name dates to 1890 from a report about cattle thefts when it was then known as Weasel Head crossing, where the Priddis trail forded the Elbow River. In 1900, the government of the North-West Territories built a steel bridge across the ford, which was later moved along with the trail further east in 1905. In 1915, the Canadian Military began leasing part of the Tsuu T'ina reserve north of Weaselhead as a training camp. In 1924, they started leasing 11,800 acres of land to the south, including a portion of what would later become Weaselhead Flats, known as the Sarcee Artillery Range. During the 1920s, the City of Calgary was planning on damming the Elbow River to the northeast to create a source of drinking water for citizens but realized that the planned damming would flood a portion of the Tsuu T'ina reserve. So, the affected land was purchased from the Tsuu T'ina Nation in 1931. In 1933, the Glenmore Dam was created, and the park area was flooded to create the delta that exists today. From 1924 until 1990, the Sarcee Artillery Range was used for numerous different military testing, including simulated nuclear explosions, war games, firing practice, and anti-aircraft and artillery training. Even though the Weaselhead area was purchased by the city, it continued to be included in these exercises. In 1965, the park was founded by then mayor Grant MacEwan. After the 2013 floods, multiple unexploded ordinances were found in the park, leading to the park being closed for six months until it was reopened in January 2014. In 2020, the bridge in the park was given an official name after Barry Erskine, a former city council member, following his passing.

== Ecology ==
The park features some of the greatest biodiversity in Calgary, with over 300 plant species and over 200 species of birds being recorded in the park. The Barry Erskine Bridge has a large colony of cliff swallows nesting under it, and the meadows in the park are one of the only places in Calgary to have breeding calliope hummingbirds. Other common bird species in the park include clay-coloured sparrow, cedar waxwing, common merganser, spotted sandpiper, and white-throated sparrow. Mammals in the park include some of the only black bears in city limits, American red squirrel, Canadian beaver, moose, raccoon, coyote, and American mink. Common plants in the park are bearberry, common gaillardia, wood lily, and prickly wild rose.

== Gallery ==
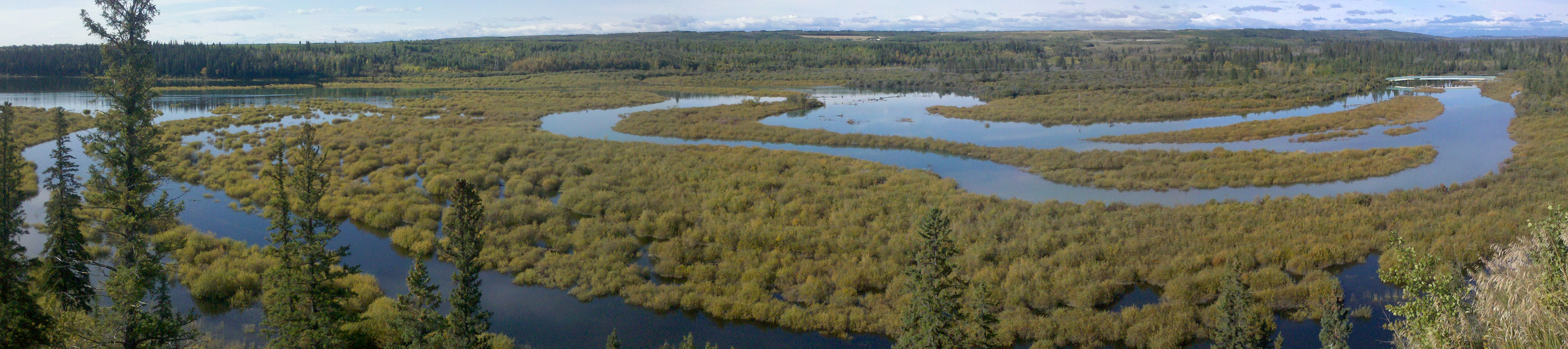
Panoramic view of the wetlands portion of the park

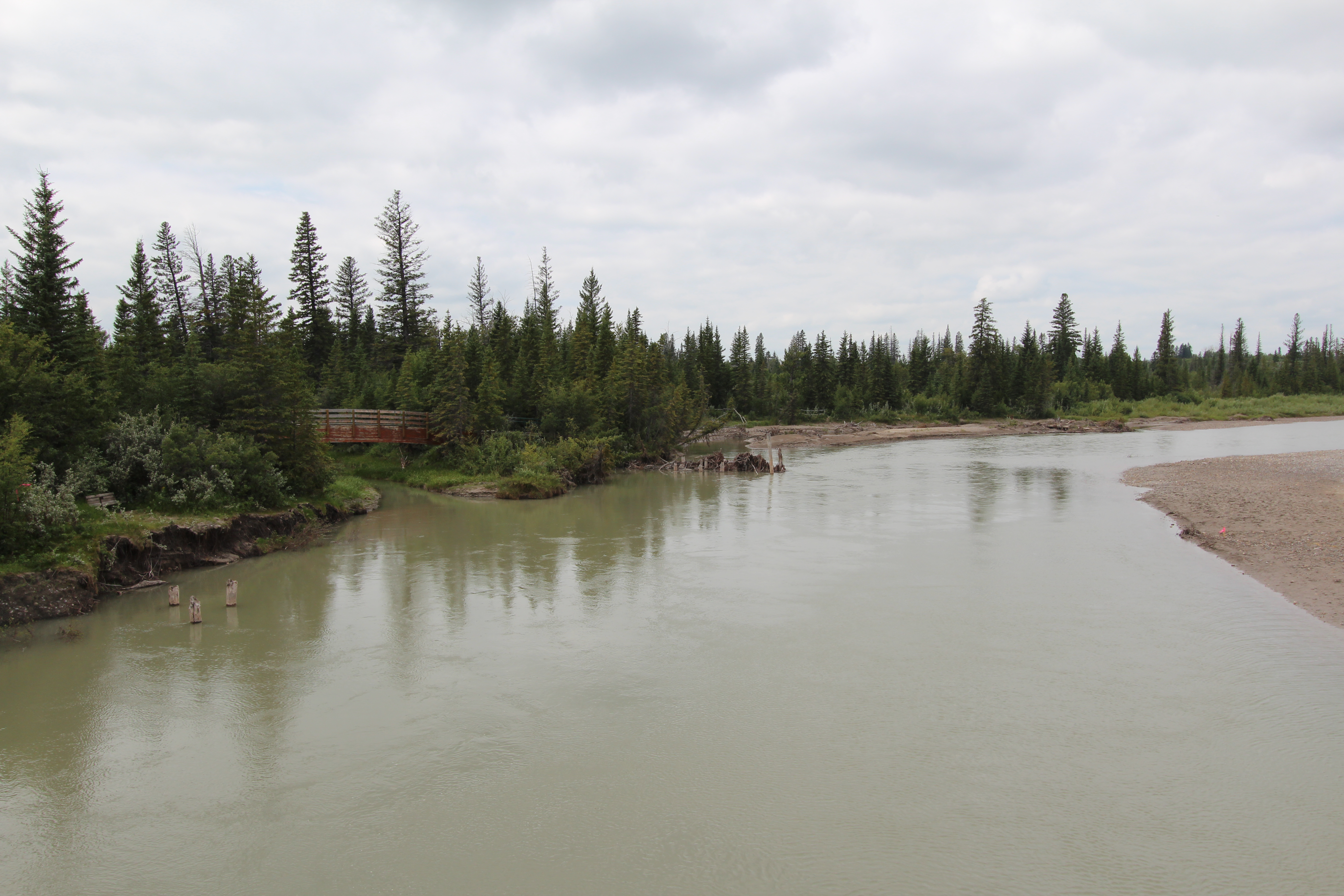
View of the park from the Barry Erskine Bridge, with the small pedestrian bridge in view

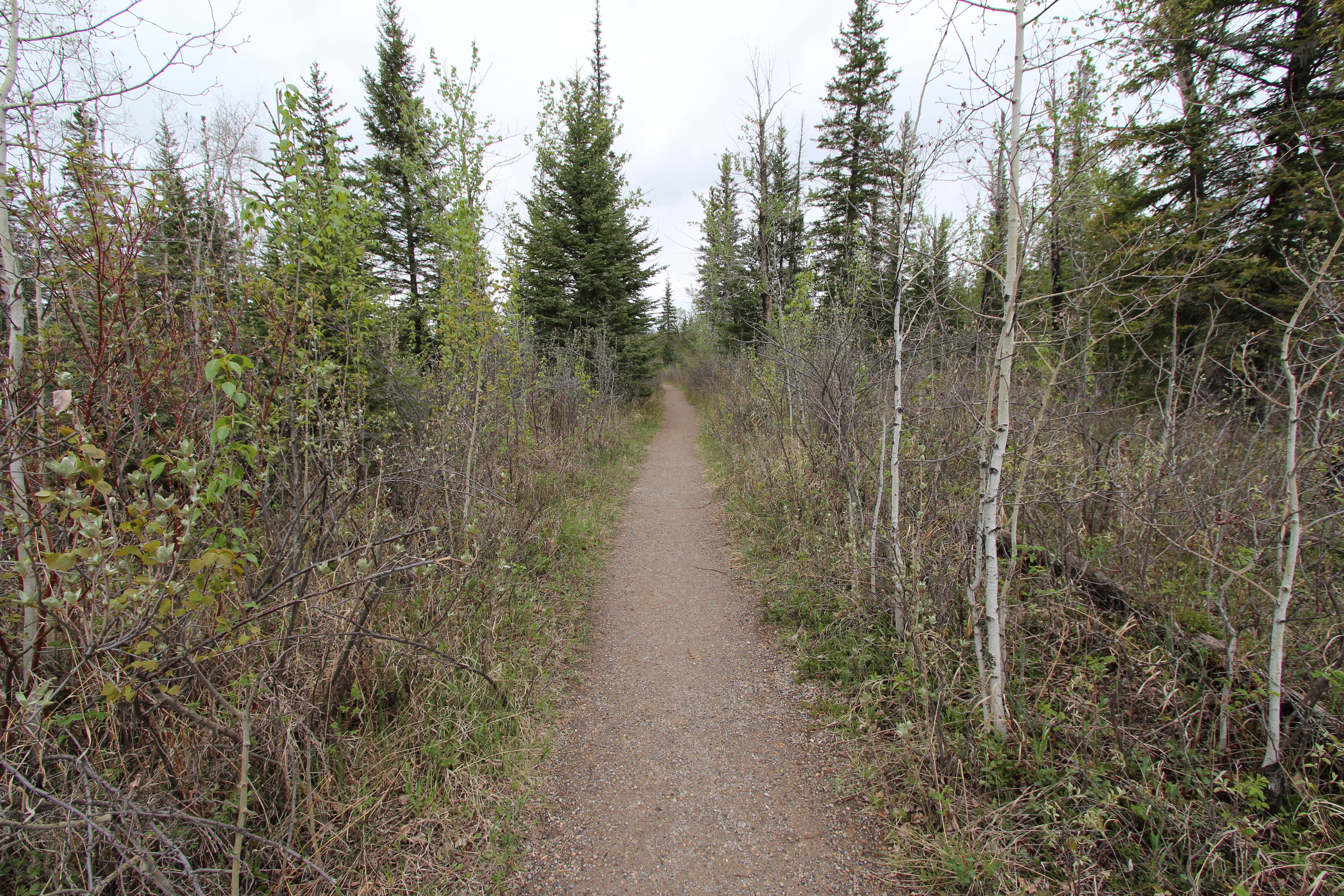
One of Weaselhead's many trails featuring tall shrubs ideal for hummingbirds

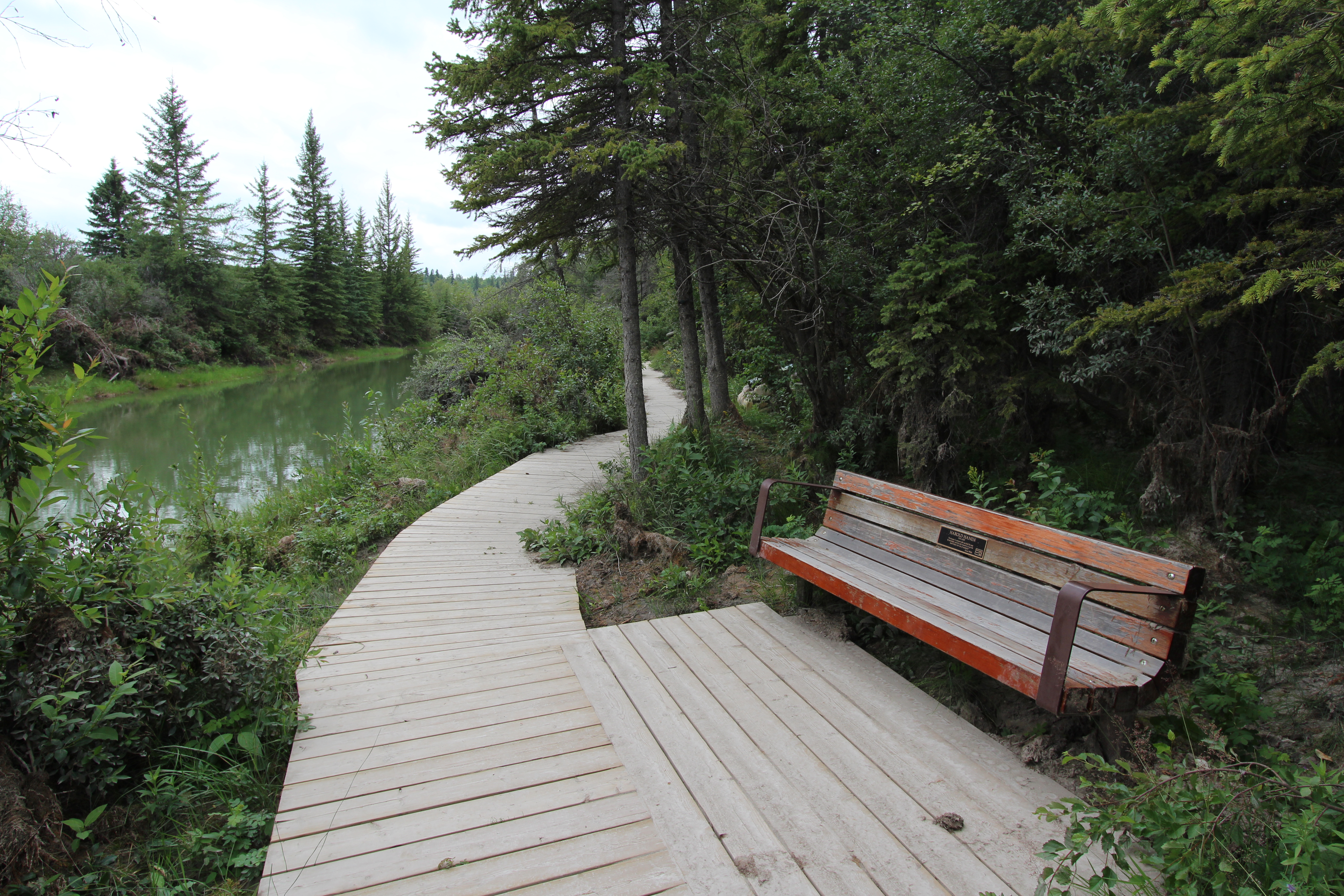
Bench along the Weaselhead boardwalk

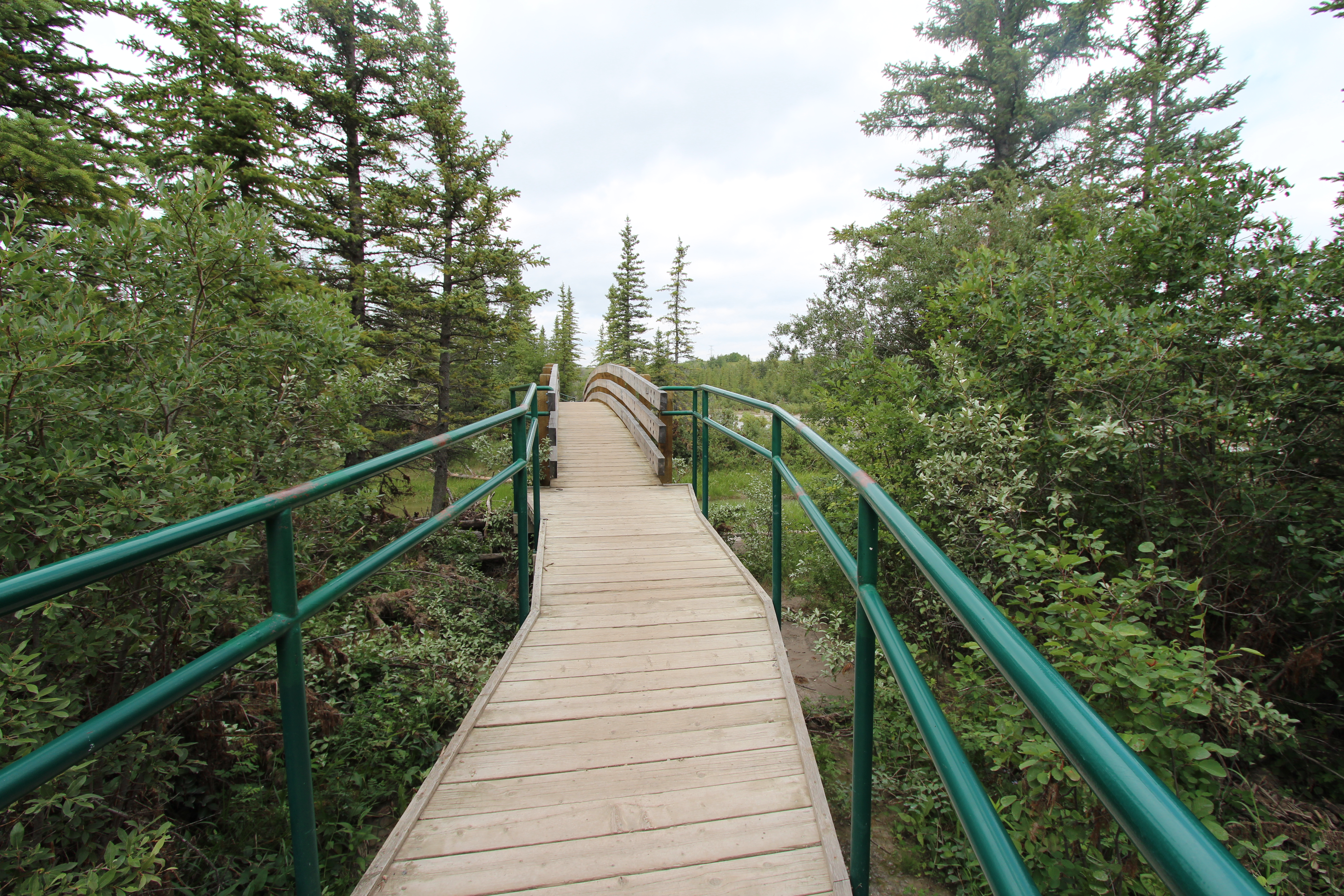
Pedestrian bridge over a small tributary of the Elbow River in the delta

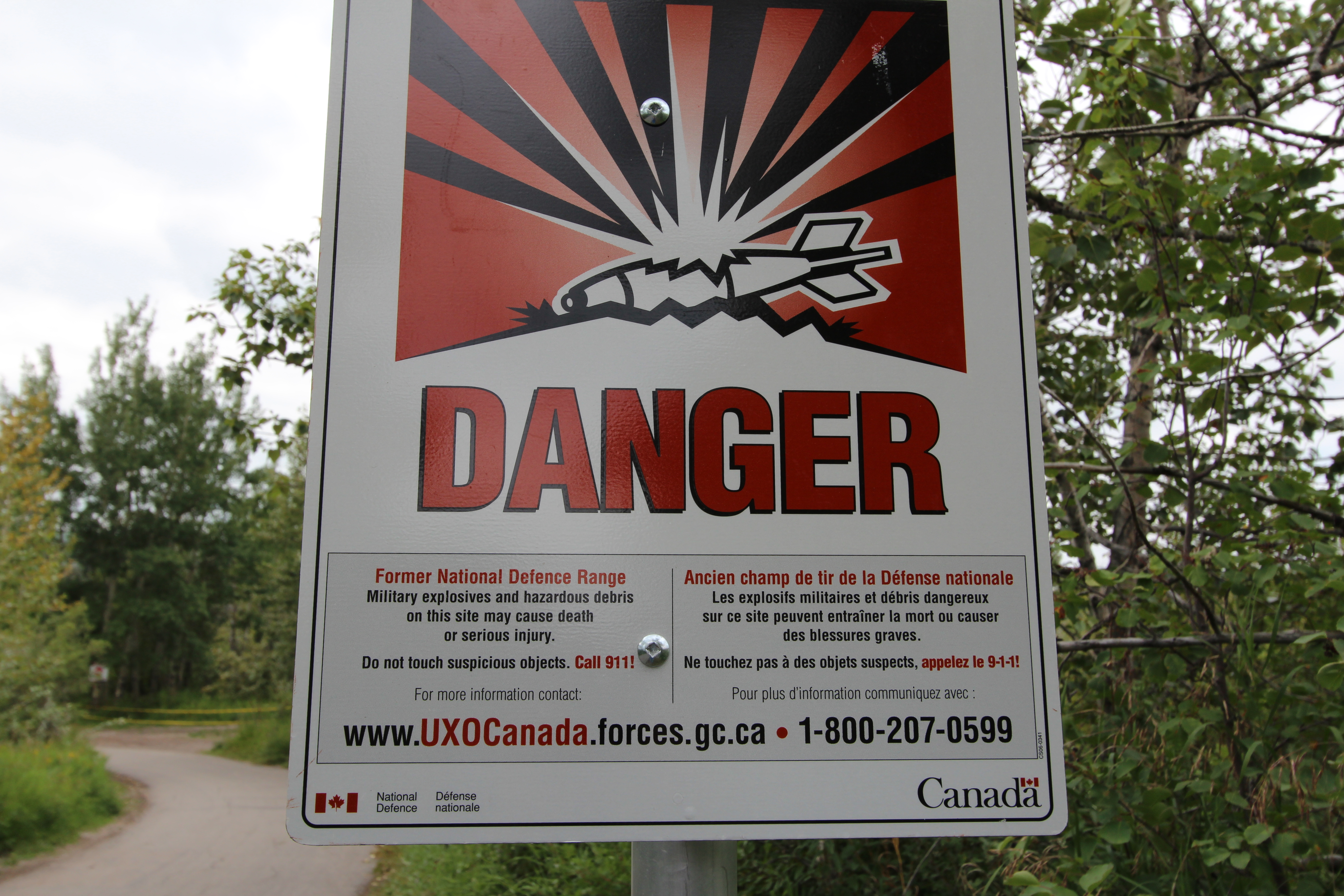
One of multiple signs around the park warning about the risk of unexploded ordinances in the park

== See also ==
- List of attractions and landmarks in Calgary
- List of protected areas of Alberta
- List of parks in Calgary
