= Griffith Woods Park =

Park in Calgary, Alberta

Griffith Woods
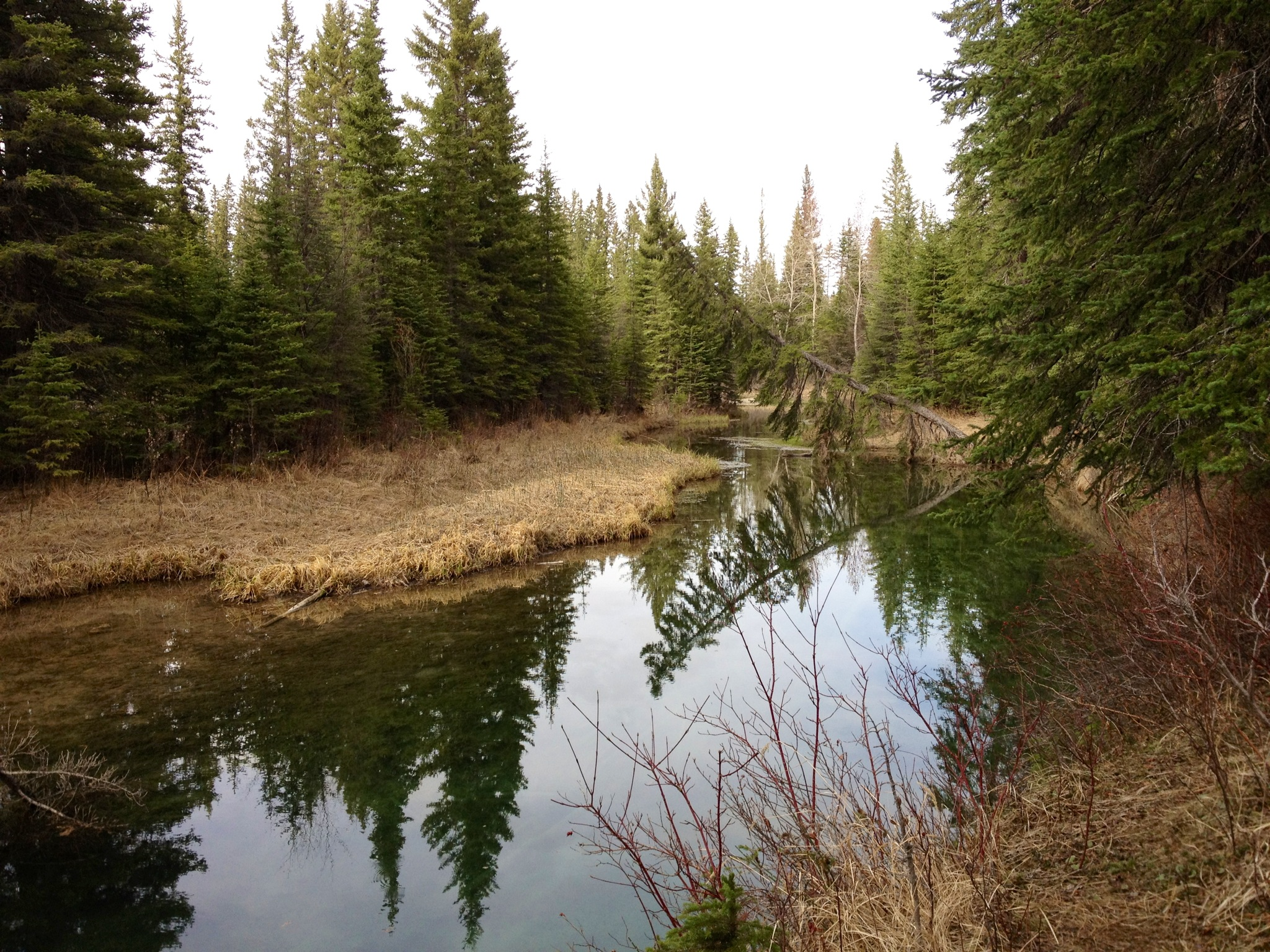
- Griffith Woods in spring

- Location within Calgary
- Type: Urban park
- Location: Calgary, Alberta
- Coordinates: 51°00′35″N 114°12′26″W
- Area: 93 hectares (0.93 km^{2})
- Created: 2000
- Operator: City of Calgary
- Open: Year round

Griffith Woods Park is a city park in southwest Calgary, Alberta. It is a popular place for hiking and other recreation in the city.

== Description ==
Griffith Woods is surrounded by the neighbourhood of Discovery Ridge to its north, the Tsuu T'ina Nation 145 reserve to the south, the Elbow Springs Golf Club to the west and the Stoney Trail to its east. It is a forested park next to the Elbow River featuring multiple oxbow wetlands and beaver ponds. Powerlines cut through the middle of the park leaving a narrow open area. Near the eastern edge of the park is the Discovery Ridge Pond, a manmade stormwater pond. The park features numerous interconnecting trails which can be accessed in multiple places from Discovery Ridge as well as by the parking lot near the middle of the park.

== Facilities & activities ==
There are public washrooms at the parking lot. In the north of the park next to Discovery Ridge Blvd there is a soccer field, playground, picnic tables, a tennis court, and a basketball court that is turned into a skating rink during the winter. There are multiple benches and some other picnic tables throughout the park. Popular activities in the park include hiking, birdwatching, dog-walking, and mountain biking.

== History ==
The area that is now the park was used for ranching for many decades until being purchased by Wilbur Griffith, an Oklahoman who had found success in the oil business, in 1952. The Griffiths largely used to land for horse-riding until the land was donated to the city in 1998 and the park was opened in 2000. In 2013 the park was damaged by the Calgary flood. The park and the nearby neighbourhood of Discovery Ridge have become the site of increased bear encounters, with the park being closed multiple times due to bears. In September 2017 the park was closed after a Grizzly bear had two close encounters with people. In 2023 multiple undesignated trails that came close to the border with the Tsuu T'ina Reserve were closed at the request of the Tsuu T'ina Nation due to repeated trespassing onto the reserve from the park.

== Ecology ==
Griffith Woods is home to a rich diversity in flora and fauna. Over 200 species of birds have been recorded in the park, with common birds including Great horned owl, Brown creeper, Golden-crowned kinglet, Boreal chickadee, American three-toed woodpecker, Bohemian waxwing, Brown-headed cowbird, Belted kingfisher, and Rufous hummingbird. Mammals in the park include American black bear, American red squirrel, Meadow vole, Moose, American mink, and Snowshoe hare. Other animals in the park include Brook trout and Wood frog. The park has some of the greatest diversity in flora in any park in the Calgary system. Mostly dominated by White spruce other trees in the park include Trembling Aspen, Water Birch, and Balsam Poplar. The Orchids present in the park are Small Round-leaved Orchid, Yellow Lady's Slipper, Sparrow's-egg Lady's Slipper, and North Wind Bog Orchid. Other common plants in the park include Prickly Wild Rose, Northern Bedstraw, Common Juniper, Cutleaf Anemone, Twinflower, and Northern Comandra.

== See also ==
- List of attractions and landmarks in Calgary
- List of protected areas of Alberta
- List of parks in Calgary
