= Wood's Douglas Fir Tree Sanctuary =

Park in Calgary, Alberta

Douglas Fir Trail
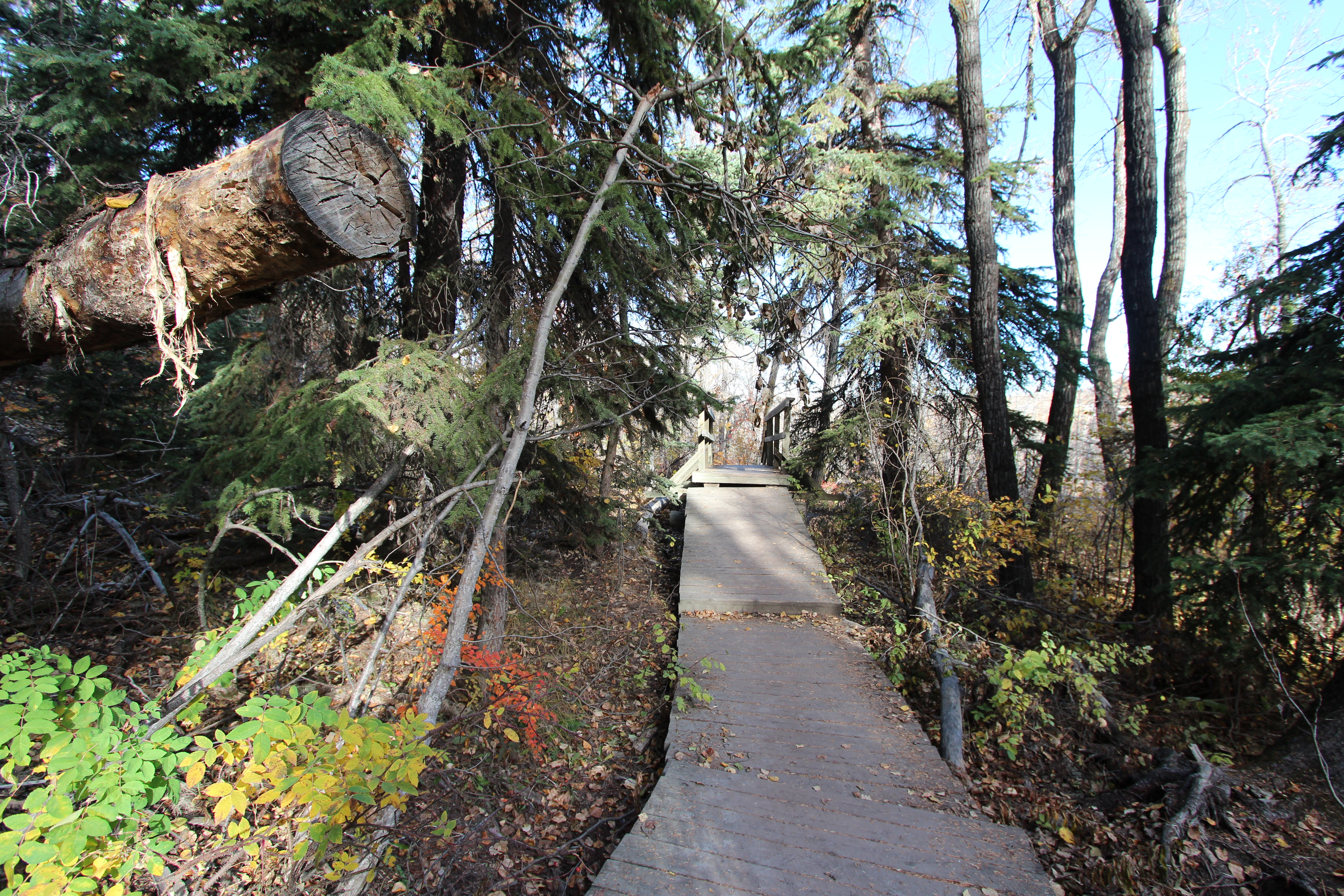
- The main Douglas Fir Trail path

- Location within Calgary
- Type: Nature reserve
- Location: Calgary, Alberta
- Coordinates: 51°03′06″N 114°07′55″W
- Area: 12.5 hectares (0.125 km^{2})
- Created: ca. 1960
- Operator: City of Calgary
- Open: Open in the spring, summer, and fall

Wood's Douglas Fir Tree Sanctuary also known as the Douglas Fir Trail is a nature sanctuary and park in southwest Calgary, Alberta. It preserves one of the oldest stands of Rocky Mountain Douglas Fir still remaining in the province.

== Description ==
The Douglas Fir Trail is treated as part of Edworthy Park by Calgary Parks, who maintains the sanctuary. It is located in the Bow River Valley, with the neighbourhoods of Spruce Cliff and Wildwood to its south and with Edworthy Park and Lawrey Gardens to its west and north respectively. The trail can be accessed by the Quarry Road Trail, a path from Cedar Crescent SW, the Bow River Pathway in Lawrey Gardens, an entrance path in the Wildwood neighbourhood and the west entrance in Edworthy Park. The sanctuary itself features boardwalks and trails in an area of large stands of Douglas Firs.

== History ==
Douglas Fir trees are known to have been used by the Indigenous peoples for bows due to its elastic quality. Due to this the area was known as man-a-cha-pan which translates to "the place they go for bows", which is what gave the Bow River its name. The sanctuary is named after Reverend George Wood, a Scottish immigrant who founded the Wood's Christian Homes and whose property the sanctuary used to be part of. In 1962 the area that is now the Douglas Fir Trail was purchased along with Edworthy Park by the City of Calgary to be developed into a park. In 1990 it was recognised as a Provincial Historical Resource by the provincial government. After damage to the area by the 2013 floods, the sanctuary was closed for four years for restoration efforts until being reopened in 2017. After its reopening it was made to be closed during the winter, due to water damage from the rain and floods making it a more difficult and steeper hike.

== Ecology ==
The most notable feature of the sanctuary is its large stands of Rocky Mountain Douglas Fir, some of the last remaining stands east of the Rocky Mountains in the province. This specific inland variety of the tree had been largely removed from the province through fires and forestry. the Douglas Fir is considered to be the largest tree species in Alberta, and with some of the trees in the sanctuary being upwards of 300 years old, these may very well represent some of the largest trees in the province. Some birds found in the sanctuary are not usually found in the surrounding areas due to their more boreal and cordilleran nature including Steller's jay and White-winged crossbill. Other common birds on the trail include Pine grosbeak, Boreal chickadee, Townsend's solitaire, American three-toed woodpecker, and Great horned owl. Other plants in the sanctuary include Canada Violet, Bearberry, Creeping Juniper, Red Baneberry, Sparrow's-egg Lady's Slipper, and North Wind Bog Orchid.

== See also ==
- List of attractions and landmarks in Calgary
- List of protected areas of Alberta
- List of parks in Calgary
