= Chinese Cultural Centre (Calgary) =

Building in Calgary, Alberta, Canada

Calgary Chinese Cultural Centre
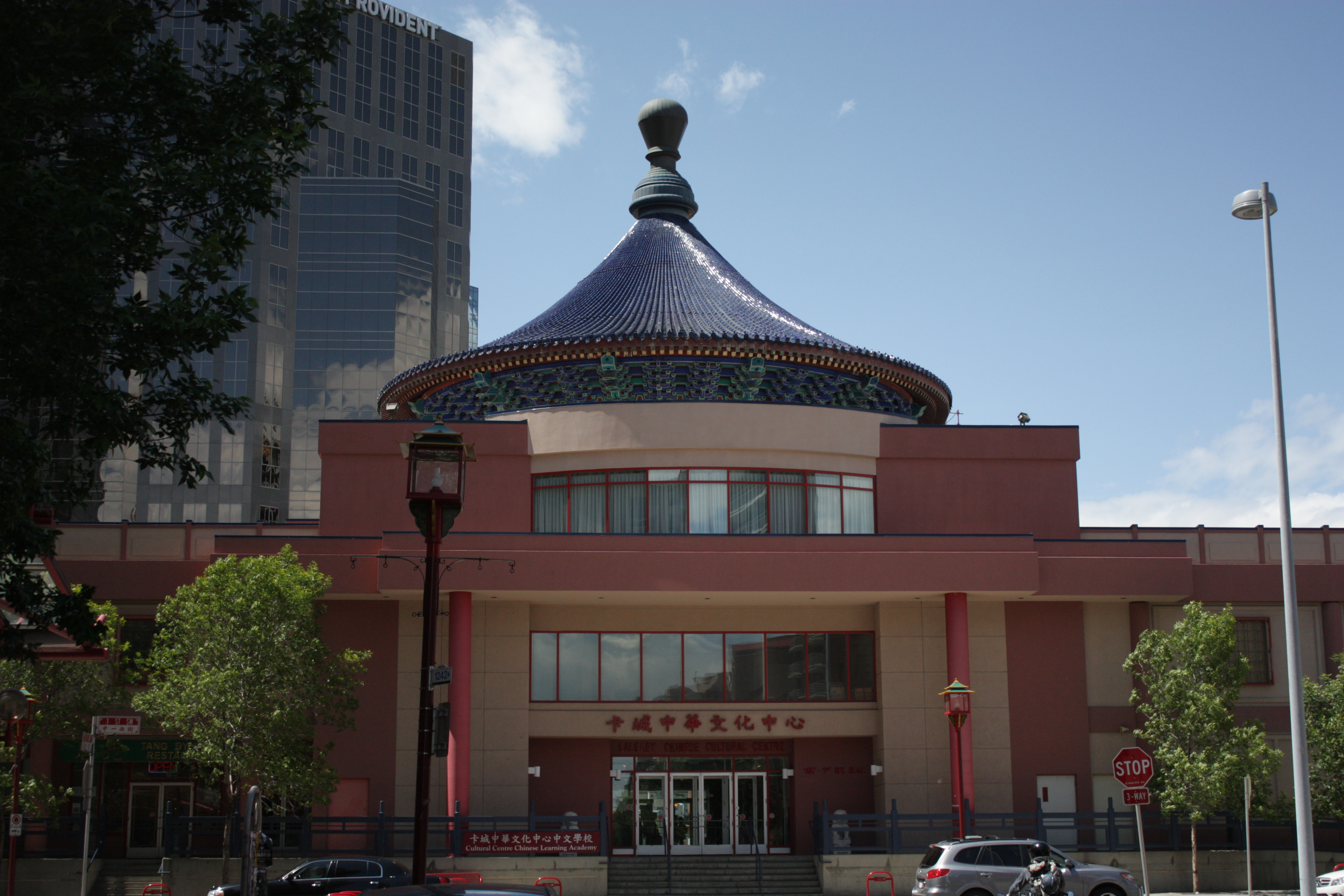
- Chinese Cultural Centre

- Location in Calgary
- Established: 1992
- Location: Calgary, Alberta
- Coordinates: 51.051667°N 114.065556°W
- Type: Cultural Centre
- Website: http://www.culturalcentre.ca/

The Chinese Cultural Centre is a building in Calgary, Alberta, Canada. It is located on the north-eastern side of downtown and was completed in September 1992.

The centre piece of the complex is the Dr. Henry Fok Cultural Hall, a building modeled after the Hall of Prayers of the Temple of Heaven in Beijing. The 70 foot (21 m) high ceiling is decorated with 561 dragons and 40 phoenixes. It is supported by 4 columns with gold ornamentation representing each season. The outer surface of the dome is covered in blue tiles imported from China and crafted by the same company that endowed the Temple of Heaven during the Ming Dynasty 600 years ago. They were installed in traditional Chinese layered fashion and consolidated with mortar.

The second level of the building contains classrooms and a library with books in Chinese and English (Orrin and Clara Christie Might Library). The main level hosts Dr. Henry Fok Cultural Hall, Henry G.D. Chow auditorium and a traditional Chinese medicine facility. There's also a restaurant and Chinese Artifacts Museum on the lower level.

== Chinese Artifacts Museum ==
The Chinese Artifacts Museum is located on the lower level of the centre. Exhibits include the story of Chinese immigration in Canada, and the history of the Chinese community in Calgary. There are also replicas of different kinds of Chinese artifacts, including Terracotta warriors, mahogany furniture set, ceramics, sculptures, clothing, bronze pieces and art.

== History ==
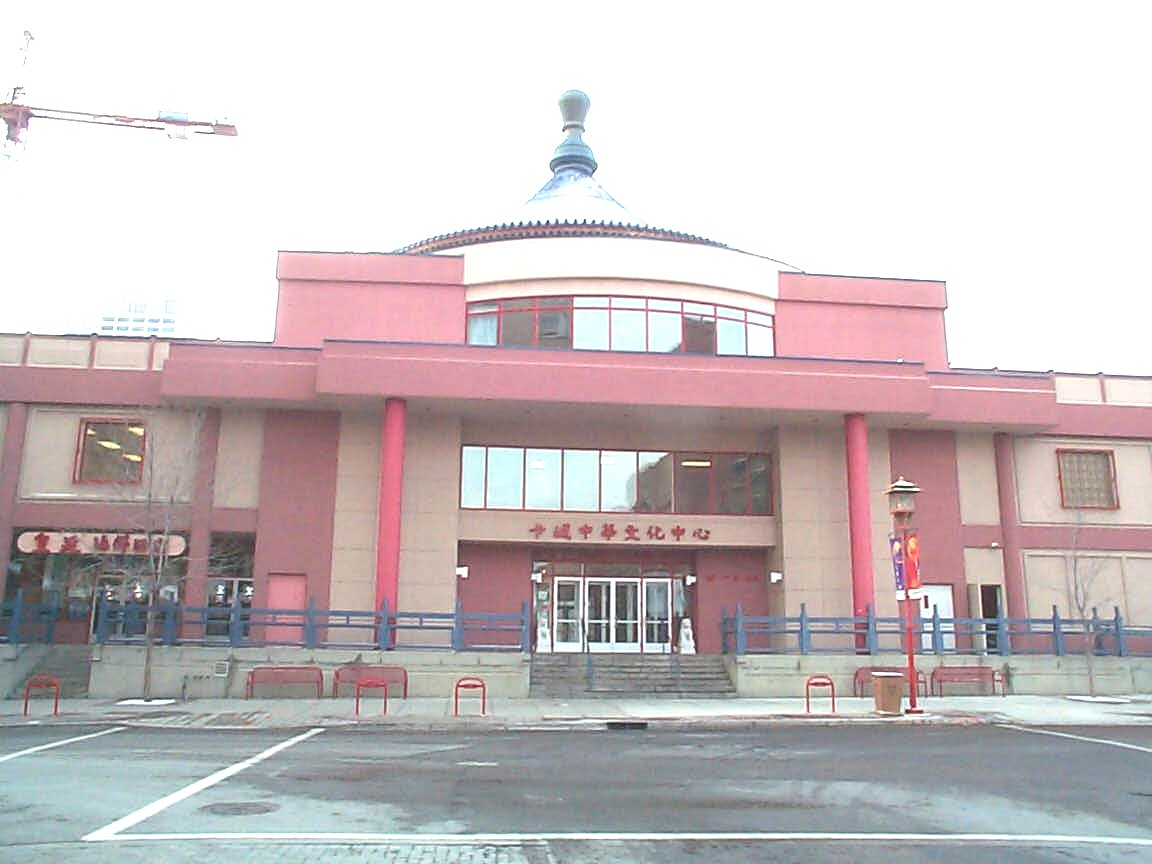
Seen from west

Interest for redevelopment of the area became acute in 1982, and in order to preserve the unique Chinese identity of the area, the City of Calgary and residents of the area came up with a redevelopment plan that would preserve the cultural identity and prevent Chinatown from being dominated by skyscrapers.

The original area redevelopment plan called for the reduction of Chinatown by 40% in area, so the community, together with city planning, produced a plan that included the construction of a large cultural centre. The plan was agreed upon by all involved parts.

The building was inaugurated in September 1992.

There are many events throughout the year to celebrate Chinese holidays and events. There are performances such as traditional Chinese lion dances and Chinese opera.

== See also ==
- Chinatown, Calgary
- List of attractions and landmarks in Calgary
