= Sien Lok Park =

Park in Calgary, Alberta, Canada

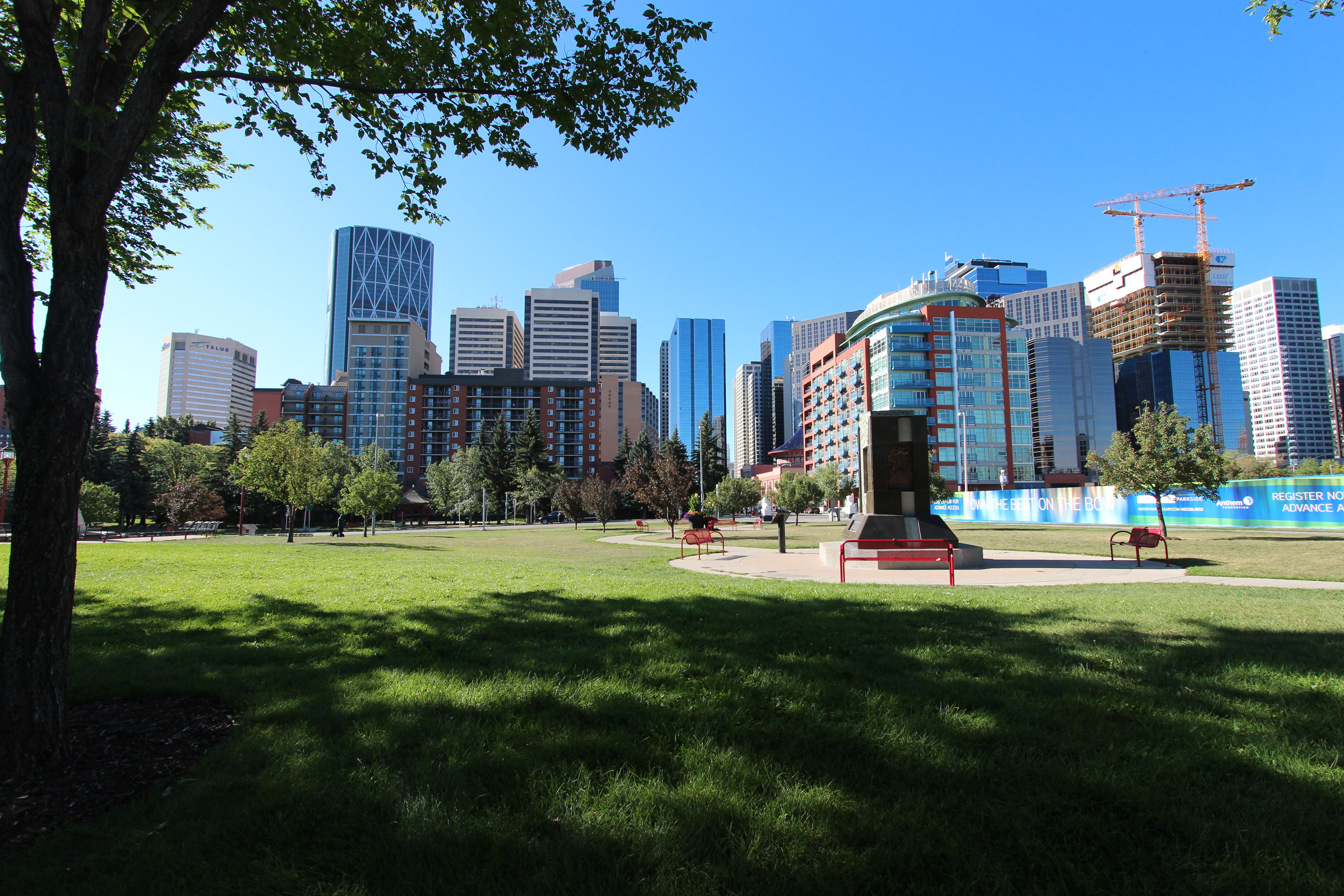
- Downtown Calgary seen from Sien Lok Park
- Interactive map of Sien Lok Park
- Type: Urban park
- Location: Calgary, Alberta
- Coordinates: 51°03′09″N 114°03′51″W
- Area: 5.8 acres (0.023 km^{2})
- Created: 1982
- Operator: City of Calgary

Sien Lok Park (Chinese: 善樂公園) is an urban park located in Calgary, Alberta, Canada. It sits between the Chinatown neighbourhood to the south, and the Bow River to the north. The park was established in 1982 by the Sien Lok Society of Calgary. The park features several sculptures and seating areas, as well as a playground. The Bow River pathway runs along the north side of the park.

== History ==
In the late 1970s, the City of Calgary created a rehabilitation plan for the Chinatown neighbourhood with the intention of retaining and further developing it as a residential community. The site of Sien Lok Park, originally called Chinatown Park, was previously occupied by a bus garage. The park officially opened in 1982.

In the years since, the park has undergone several changes, including the installation of several monuments and linking it to the Bow River pathway.

== Features ==
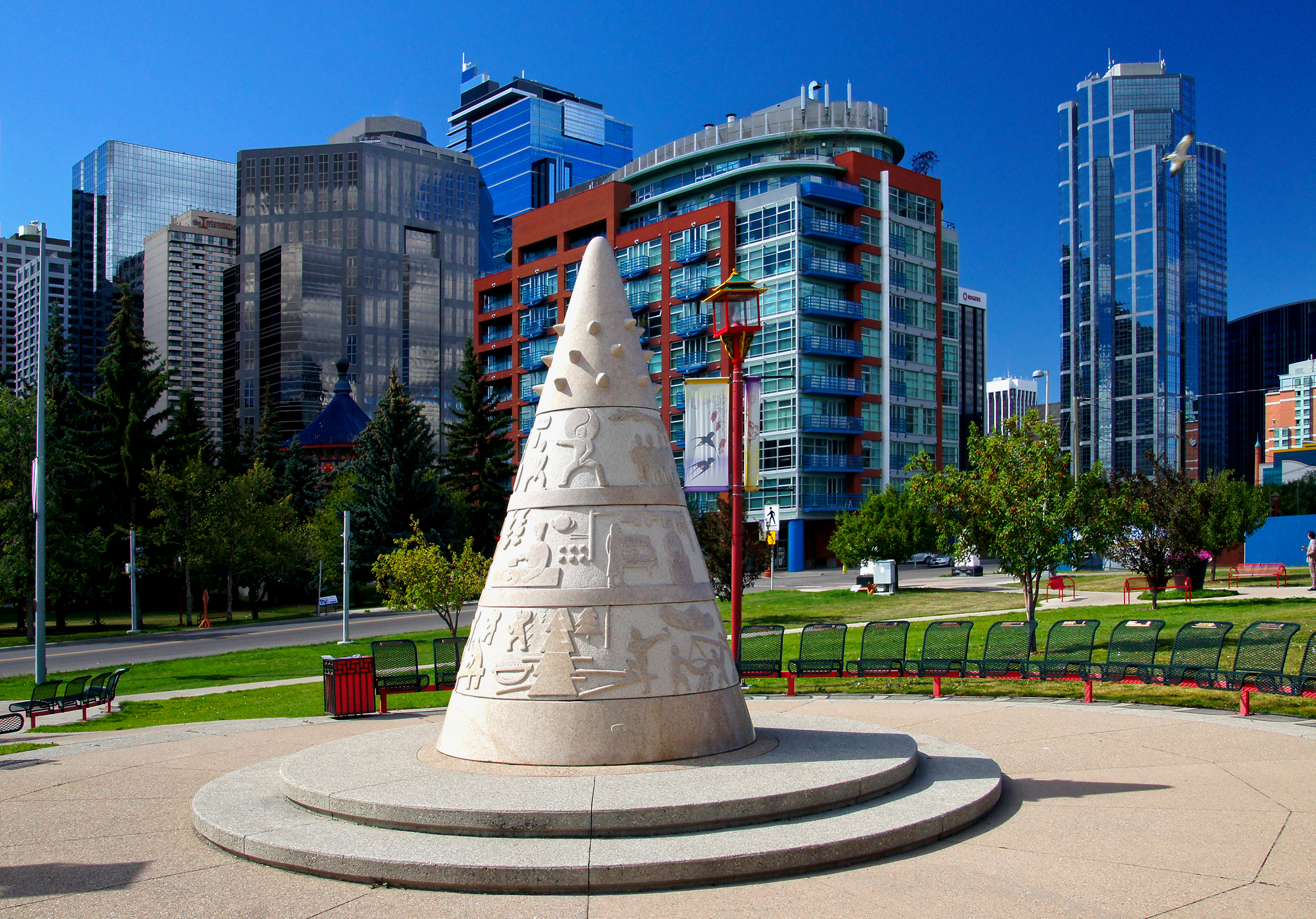
In Search of Gold Mountain by Chu Honsun

Sien Lok Park is bisected by Riverfront Avenue. The south side of the park includes a playground and a concrete Tai chi area. The north side of the park features winding pathways, benches, and several monuments and sculptures.

The sculpture In Search of Gold Mountain by Chu Honsun was installed in 2000. The large conical sculpture depicts Chinese railworkers alongside Chinese iconography. The Wall of Names monument is located nearby, and is dedicated to the history of Chinese immigration in Canada. The monument lists the names of those who arrived in Canada between 1886 and 1947, known as the "Exclusion Era" when Chinese immigrants were subject to additional race-based taxes and limited opportunities.
