= Barb Scott Park =

Park in Calgary, Alberta, Canada

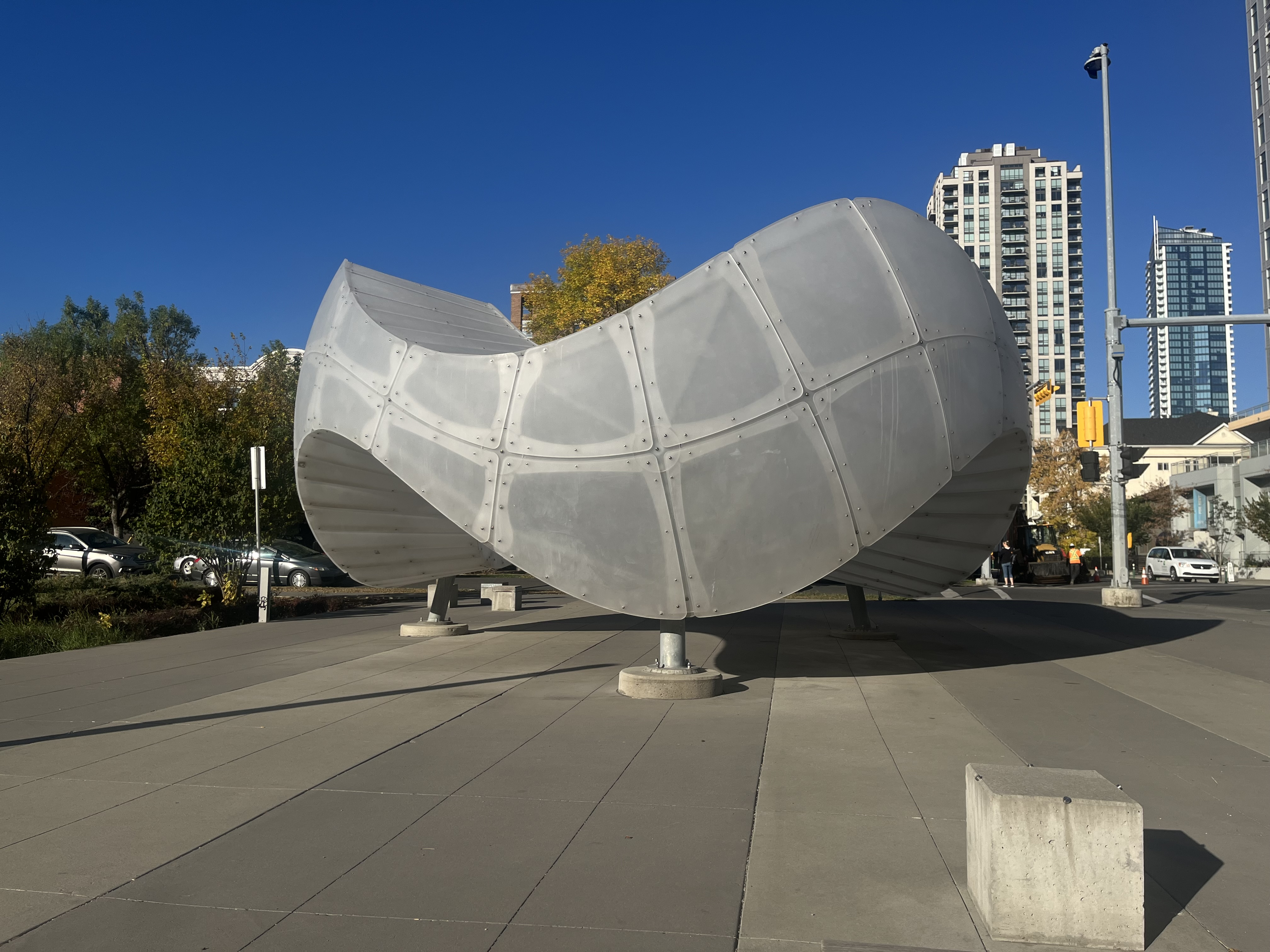
- Chinook Arc at Barb Scott Park
- Interactive map of Barb Scott Park
- Type: Urban park
- Location: Calgary, Alberta
- Coordinates: 51°02′29″N 114°05′00″W
- Area: 0.42 hectares (1.0 acre)
- Created: 2013
- Operator: City of Calgary

Barb Scott Park is an urban park located in downtown Calgary. The park was named in honor of Barb Scott, a Calgary Alderman who served on council for 24 years. The park is located on the same block as the Calgary Board of Education headquarters, the Dr Carl Safran Centre.

== Features ==
The park features a small greenspace with garden beds and a seating area. The focal point of the park is the Chinook Arc, an interactive illuminated sculpture created by artists Joe O'Connell and Blessing Hancock. During the winter the park contains a temporary skating rink.

== See also ==
- List of attractions and landmarks in Calgary
