= Sikome Lake =

Man-made lake in Alberta, Canada

Sikome Aquatic Facility
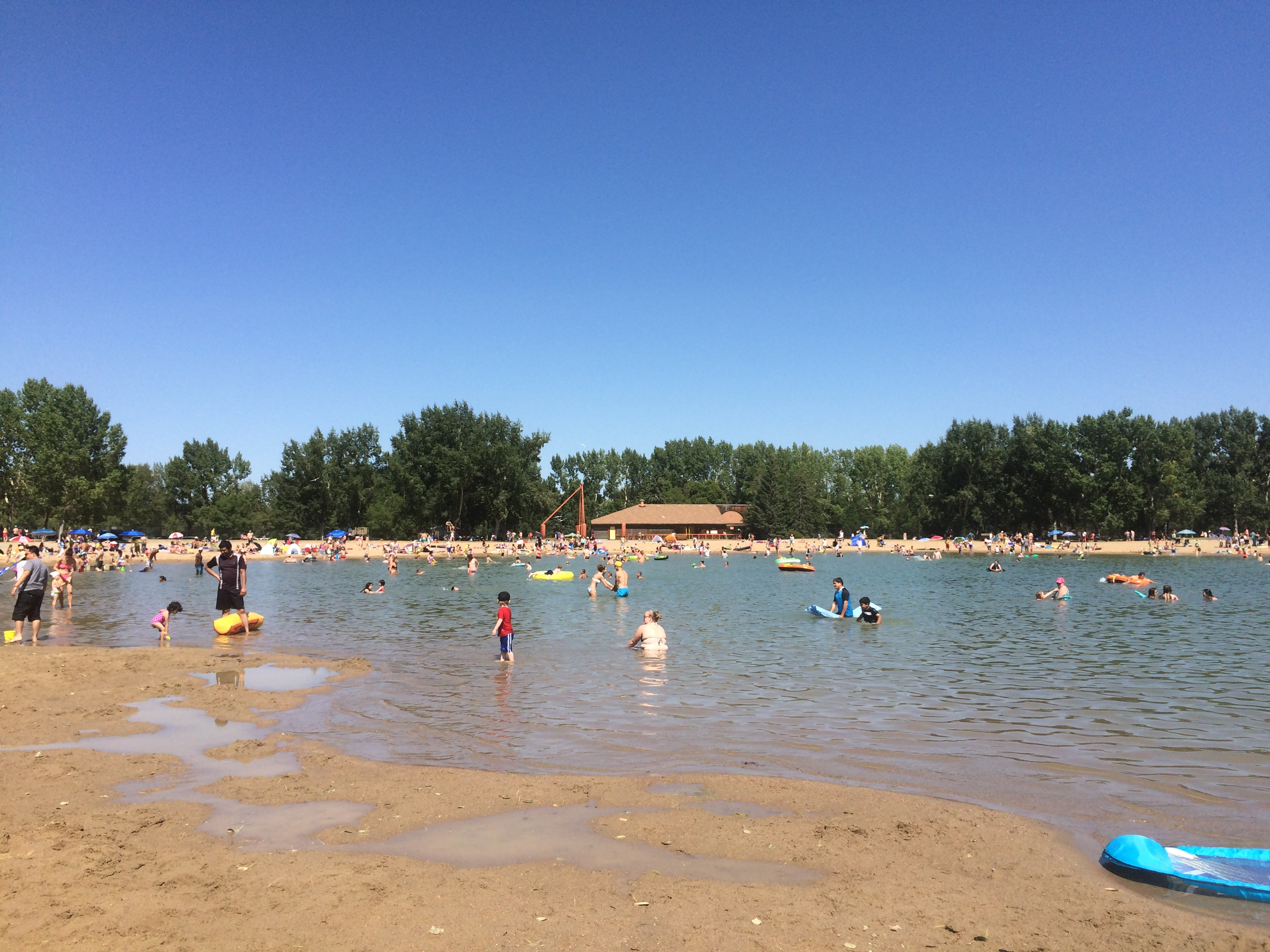
- North End of Sikome Lake

- Location within Calgary
- Location: Calgary, Alberta
- Coordinates: 50°53′58″N 114°00′56″W
- Type: Artificial
- Basin countries: Canada
- Surface area: 0.4 km^{2} (40 ha; 99 acres)
- Max. depth: {depth is variable}
- Surface elevation: 1,005 m (3,297 ft)
- Settlements: Calgary Open 11am - 6pm Monday - Thursday // 10am - 7pm Weekends

The Sikome Aquatic Facility, commonly referred to as Sikome Lake, is a man-made lake in the city of Calgary, Alberta, Canada. It is located in the southeast quadrant of the city, within the Fish Creek Provincial Park, and is part of the Bow River basin. It lies at an elevation of 1,005 m (3,297 ft) and has a surface of 0.4 km^{2} (40 ha; 99 acres).

First opened in late summer 1978, it is a swimming area open during the summer as a public beach. Up to 20,000 swimmers a day visit the lake during summer week-ends. The beach is staffed by Alberta Provincial Parks aquatic staff. Until the mid-to-late 1980s, the lake was used as a skating rink in the Winter months. Now, during the winter the water is drained, and it takes three weeks to fill the lake every spring. A filtration system that chlorinates the water supply was implemented in 1991 at a cost of $1.8 million.

For the 2004 season, the lake was closed to public due to construction. It has been closed before, in July 1990 and August 1998, due to excessive contamination from bird droppings and in Summer 2004 due to flooding. A fence was constructed in 2013 to increase public safety and control unwanted behaviour.

== See also ==
- List of lakes in Alberta
- List of attractions and landmarks in Calgary
