= List of tourist attractions in Calgary =

This is a list of tourist attractions in Calgary, Alberta, Canada.

The city of Calgary has over one million inhabitants. Tourism is an important part of the local economy, contributing $2.1 billion in 2019.

== Downtown ==
Attraction	Address	Type	Remarks	Image
Werklund Centre	205 8 Avenue S.E; 51.04528°N 114.06028°W	Arts venue	Performing arts venue, home of Calgary Philharmonic Orchestra	EPCOR Centre
Burns Building	237 8 Ave SE; 51.04583°N 114.05861°W	Building	Historic site built by Pat Burns in 1913	Burns Building
Calgary Telus Convention Centre	120 9 Ave SE; 51.04528°N 114.06083°W	Convention centre		Telus Convention Centre
Calgary Tower	101 9 Ave SW; 51.044444°N 114.063528°W	Tower	Observation tower	Calgary Tower
Chinese Cultural Centre	197 1 St SW; 51.05167°N 114.06556°W	Museum	Community center for the Community of Chinatown	Chinese Cultural Centre
City Hall	800 Macleod Trail SE; 51.04500°N 114.05722°W	Building	National Historic Site	City Hall
CORE Shopping Centre	324 8 Ave SW, Calgary, AB T2P 2Z2	Building	Dominant shopping complex located in the downtown core of Calgary	
Devonian Gardens	409 8 Ave SW; 51.046000°N 114.073167°W	Urban park	Botanical garden with seasonal exhibitions	Devonian Gardens
Dragon City Mall	100 3 Ave SE; 51.050611°N 114.062111°W	Shopping mall	Asian-themed mall	Dragon City Mall
Fairmont Palliser Hotel	133 9 Ave SW; 51.04444°N 114.06528°W	Hotel	One of Canada's grand railway hotels	Fairmont Palliser
Fort Calgary	750 9 Ave SE; 51.045139°N 114.045778°W	Museum	National Historic Site	Fort Calgary
Glenbow Museum	130 9 Ave SE; 51.04472°N 114.06083°W	Museum	Western Canada's largest museum	Glenbow Museum
Shaw Millennium Park	800 11 St SW; 51.04611°N 114.09167°W	Urban park	Skatepark	Millennium Park
National Music Centre	134 11 Ave SE; 51.04250°N 114.06083°W	Museum	Over 2,000 rare instruments and artifacts along with the Canadian Music Hall of Fame and Canadian Country Music Hall of Fame collections	National Music Centre
Olympic Plaza	801 Macleod Trail SE; 51.04583°N 114.05861°W	Urban park	Named for the 1988 Winter Olympics, site of open-air festivals	Olympic Plaza
Peace Bridge	51.05389°N 114.07883°W	Bridge	One of the most photographed sites in Calgary	Peace Bridge
Plus 15	Downtown Calgary	Skyway	Skywalk network	+15
Prince's Island Park	100 2 St SW; 51.05500°N 114.06750°W	Urban park	Hosts open-air festivals	Prince's Island Park
Stephen Avenue	8 Ave SW; 51.04556°N 114.06556°W	Street	Heritage buildings	Stephen Avenue
The Bow	124 7th Ave SE; 51.04778°N 114.06222°W	Skyscraper	Second-tallest building in Calgary	The Bow
West Eau Claire Park	Bow River Pathway	Urban park	Redevelopment adjacent to the Peace Bridge	West Eau Clair Park

== Northwest ==
Attraction	Address	Type	Remarks	Image
Confederation Park	24 Ave & 14 St NW; 51.07667°N 114.08444°W	Urban park	Site of Lions Club Christmas Light Display	Confederation Park
Kensington	Kensington Rd NW; 51.05250°N 114.09472°W	Street	Business Revitalisation Zone, shopping and restaurants, heritage buildings	Kensington
Market Mall	3625 Shaganappi Trail NW; 51.08472°N 114.15611°W	Shopping mall	One of the largest malls (by area) in Calgary	Market Mall
Parkdale	Parkdale Boulevard; 51.05889°N 114.13861°W	Public art	Parkdale Plaza	"Outfall"
McMahon Stadium	1817 Crowchild Trail NW; 51.07028°N 114.12139°W	Sports venue	Canadian football stadium, home of the Calgary Stampeders (CFL)	McMahon Stadium
Baker Park	1817 Crowchild Trail NW; 51.09722°N 114.21556°W	Urban park	Most popular Calgary park for outdoor wedding. River observation point.	
Nose Hill Park	14 St, Shaganappi Trail, John Laurie Blvd NW; 51.117°N 114.117°W	Urban park	One of the largest municipal parks in Canada	Nose Hill Park
Olympic Oval	111 University Gate NW; 51.07694°N 114.13556°W	Sports venue	Speed skating oval, home of the Calgary Inferno CWHL hockey team	Olympic Oval
Southern Alberta Jubilee Auditorium	1415 14 Ave NW; 51.06250°N 114.09306°W	Music venue	Performing arts, culture and community facility, home of Calgary Opera	Southern Alberta Jubilee Auditorium
University of Calgary	2500 University Dr NW; 51.07750°N 114.13306°W	University	Public university	University of Calgary

== Northeast ==
	Address	Type	Remarks	Image
Baitun Nur	4353 54 Avenue NE; 51.101743°N 113.972039°W	Mosque	Largest mosque in Canada	Baitun Nur mosque
The Hangar Flight Museum	4629 McCall Way NE; 51.09417°N 114.01306°W	Museum	History of aviation and space technology of western Canada	
YYC Calgary International Airport	2000 Airport Rd NE; 51.11389°N 114.02028°W	Airport	International airport, part of the National Airports System	Calgary International Airport
Marlborough Mall	433 Marlborough Way NE; 51.05472°N 113.97833°W	Shopping mall	Opened in 1972	Marlborough Mall
Sunridge Mall	2525 36 St NE; 51.07444°N 113.98583°W	Shopping mall	Opened in 1981	Sunridge Mall
Telus Spark	220 St. George's Drive NE; 51.04778°N 114.08861°W	Museum	Interactive exhibits, multimedia presentations, educational demonstrations	Telus World of Science
Wilder Institute/Calgary Zoo	1300 Zoo Rd NE; 51.04583°N 114.03333°W	Zoo	Second largest zoo in Canada	Calgary Zoo

== Southwest ==
	Address	Type	Remarks	Image
Battalion Park	Signal Hill Ctr SW; 51.02028°N 114.17139°W	Urban park	Formerly known as Camp Sarcee	Battalion Park
Canada Olympic Park	88 Canada Olympic Rd NW; 51.07972°N 114.19917°W	Ski resort	1988 Winter Olympics venue now used for Recreation and Athletic training	Canada Olympic Park
Canada's Sports Hall of Fame	169 Canada Olympic Road NW; 51.08250°N 114.22111°W	Museum	The main national hall of fame for sports in general	Hall of Fame
Chinook Centre	6455 Macleod Trail SW; 50.99833°N 114.07389°W	Shopping mall	Opened in 1960	Chinook Centre
Edworthy Park	Edworthy St SW; 51.06139°N 114.15639°W	Urban park	Located along the Bow River	Edworthy Park
Fish Creek Park	SW Calgary; 50.92778°N 114.12833°W	Provincial park	One of the largest urban parks in North America	Fish Creek Provincial Park
Glenmore Reservoir	14th St & Glenmore Trail SW; 50.98139°N 114.11389°W	Lake	Manmade reservoir on the Elbow River	Glenmore Reservoir
Heritage Park	Heritage Dr & 14th St SW; 50.98528°N 114.10833°W	Museum	Historical Village	Heritage Park Historical Village
Marda Loop	33rd Avenue SW; 51.02389°N 114.11306°W	Street	Shopping, Business Revitalization Zone	Marda Loop
Spruce Meadows	Spruce Meadows Way SW; 50.88500°N 114.10056°W	Venue	Equestrian facility	Spruce Meadows
MNP Community & Sport Centre	2225 Macleod Trail SW; 51.03444°N 114.06333°W	Venue	Multi-sports complex	Talisman Centre
The Military Museums	1820 - 24 Street SW; 4520 Crowchild Trail SW; 51.01444°N 114.11583°W	Museum	Comprises the Naval Museum of Alberta, the Air Force Museum of Alberta, Library and Archives	The Military Museums
17th Avenue	17 Ave SW; 51.03778°N 114.08167°W	Street	Shopping and entertainment, site of Red Mile	

== Southeast ==
	Address	Type	Remarks	Image
Stampede Grounds	1410 Olympic Way SE; 51.03361°N 114.05389°W	Venue	Fair and Exhibition grounds	Calgary Stampede
Fish Creek Provincial Park	South Calgary; 50.90333°N 114.01972°W	Provincial park	One of the largest urban parks in North America	Fish Creek Provincial Park
Inglewood	9 Ave SE; 51.04278°N 114.03944°W	Street	Heritage buildings	Inglewood
International Avenue	17 Ave SE (Highway 1A); 51.03778°N 113.98167°W	Street	Business Revitalization Zone, cultural diverse neighbourhood, site of GlobalFest	International Avenue
Max Bell Centre	1001 Barlow Trail SE; 51.04222°N 114.00361°W	Sports venue	Ice hockey arena	Max Bell Centre
Scotiabank Saddledome	555 Saddledome Rise SE; 51.03750°N 114.05194°W	Venue	Ice hockey arena, home of the Calgary Flames (NHL), performing arts	Scotiabank Saddledome
Sikome Lake	Bow Bottom Trail SE; 50.89944°N 114.01556°W	Lake	Man-made lake, public beach	Sikome Lake
Southcentre Mall	100 Anderson Rd SE; 50.94167°N 114.06806°W	Shopping mall	Opened in 1974	Southcentre Mall

== See also ==
- Tourism in Alberta
- Tourism in Canada
- List of places of worship in Calgary
- List of tallest buildings in Calgary
