= Bowmont Park =

Public park in Calgary, Alberta

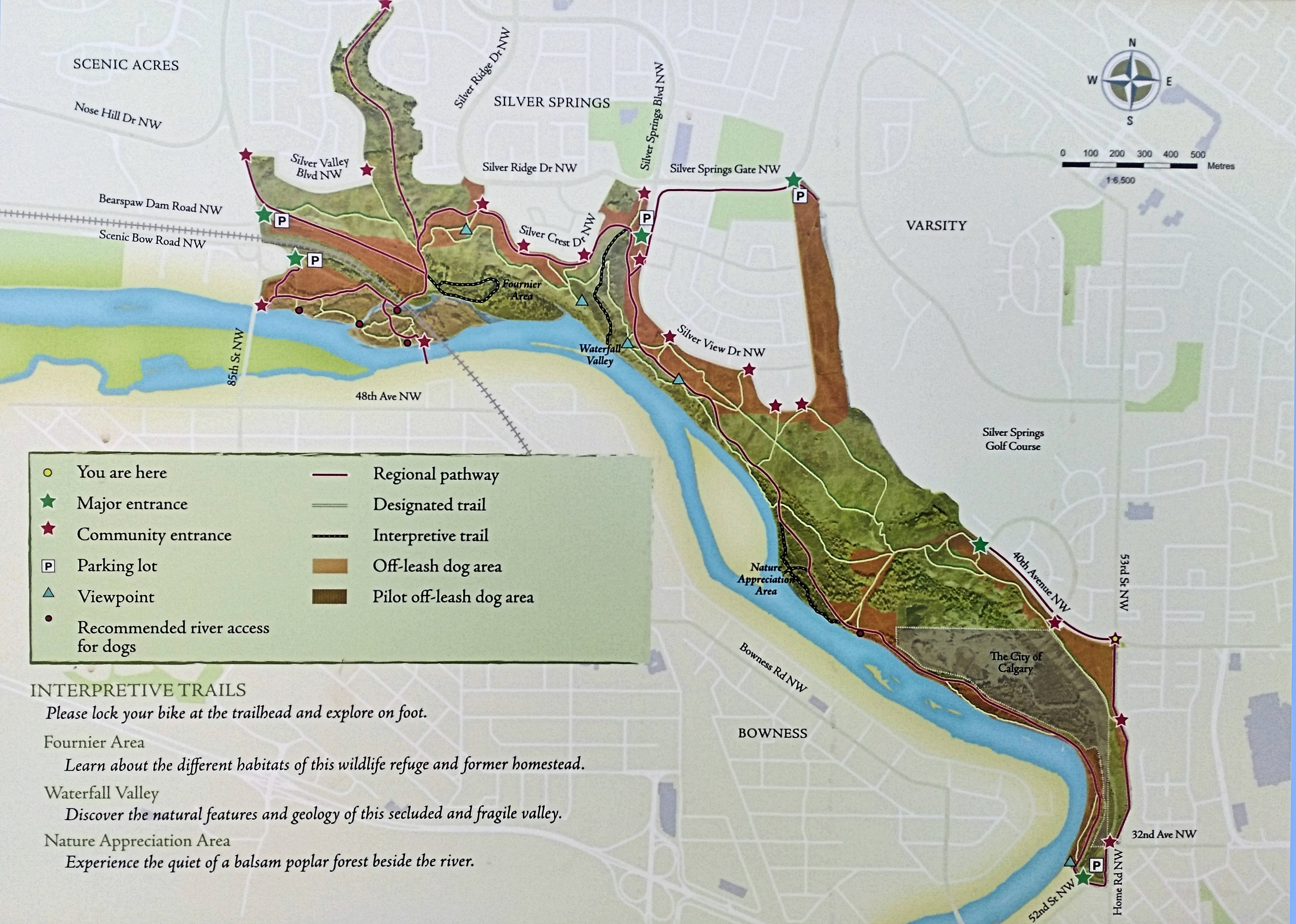
- Interactive map of Bowmont Park
- Type: Urban park
- Location: 85 St. N.W. & 48 Ave. N.W. Bowness and Montgomery, Calgary
- Nearest city: Calgary, Alberta
- Coordinates: 51°06′08″N 114°12′41″WGoogle maps
- Area: 192 hectares (470 acres)
- Operator: City of Calgary
- Open: 5 a.m. - 11 p.m. daily

Bowmont Park or Bowmont Natural Environment Park is a 192 hectares (470 acres) urban park on the northern bank of the Bow River in the northwest of the city of Calgary in the communities of Bowness and Montgomery. 'Bowmont' is a combination of their names. The Park was created in the 1980s. The escarpment formed by the Glacial Lake Calgary, runs the length of the park. Both Silver Springs and Varsity communities are perched at the top of the escarpment overlooking the Bow River and are access points to the Park. Bordering the northern banks of the Bow River, the park is includes grasslands, gullies, valleys, a waterfall with a lookout, off-leash dog-walking areas, hiking, walking and cycling trails, access to the river for swimming and fishing, and more. The most recent expansion of Bowmont Park, Dale Hodges Park which was opened to the public in June 2019, includes innovative public art in the form of sculpted land structures that treat stormwater before it enters the Bow River through the outfall.

== Description ==
Bowmont Park is a large 192 hectares (470 acres) Natural Environment Park along the Bow River that stretches along the northern river edge and escarpment forming an "important wildlife corridor providing safe nesting for osprey and other birds". It offers expansive views from the top of the escarpment at Silver Springs and Varsity communities. The escarpment was left in its natural state and it is covered in a network of walking and cycling trails. A section of the Bowmont Natural Area forms the southern border of Silver Springs and is known locally as "The Ravine" or "The Gully". This Waterfall valley is a popular recreational area. The natural environment area contrasts with the adjacent suburban area. The lookout spot provides views of the Bow River, northern Bowness, and the railroad bridges. (Note: "The park is situated within the area bounded by Stoney Trail NW to the west, Crowchild Trail to the north and 16th Avenue/TransCanada Highway to the south and southeast (Map 1). It consists of a long narrow strip of land extending for about four kilometres from 85th Street NW at the west end to Home Road to the east. It is bordered on the north by the communities of Varsity and Silver Spring, and on the south side by the Bow River and the communities of Bowness and Montgomery. The main line of the Canadian Pacific Railway cuts across the west portion of the park, parallel to the river." Page 7)

== Geological formations ==
=== Glacial Lake Calgary ===
The slopes along Bowmont Park were carved by Glacial Lake Calgary which was formed as the last glaciers melted but the runoff was blocked by an ice dam further down the Bow River Valley, during the Pleistocene epoch. The slopes are incised by ravines. They rise up along the Silver Springs and Varsity escarpments.

== Background ==
In 1994 the City of Calgary designated the Bowmont area as a Natural Environment Park. In 2004, the City approved the Bowmont Natural Environment Park Management Plan. The Bowmont Natural Environment Park Management Plan was updated in 2016. In 2010 the City acquired the former privately owned Klippert Concrete property, "located on the lower terrace below Varsity and accessed via Home Road", which "operated as a gravel pit until 2010." O2 Planning + Design Inc completed a Biophysical Impact Assessment (BIA) in 2012 and a Design Development Plan (DDP) in 2014 for the area.

== Maintenance ==
The park is maintained by the city of Calgary Recreation Department.

== Naturalization initiatives (biodiversity) ==
In Bowmont Park the naturalizing project enhances the "sensitive grassland habitat" and improves the "important wildlife corridor". In a city-wide naturalization program in 2017, Calgary Parks announced that they were naturalizing a section of Bowmont park, the off-leash area parallel to Silverview Way NW. As part of the Bowmont Park Management Plan, they were "reintroducing native species to open spaces" and in this area removing smooth brome which is an invasive plant. (Note: Calgary has a 10-year biodiversity strategic plan with a goal of restoring "20% of Calgary's open space by 2025". According to Calgary Parks, naturalization refers to creating landscapes that "help support plant, animal and insect life"—biodiversity—which also helps "control invasive weeds and pests.")

== Features ==
The park has a network of recreational pathways, nature trails, interpretive trails, and paved sections of the Bow River pathway (BRP), that can be used for hiking, running, walking, and cycling, with some single track mountain biking trails. Some sections are designated as off-leash with both fenced and unfenced areas. There are picnic sites with tables, two playgrounds, a baseball field, which is accessible off Silver Hill Rd. N.W., and a soccer field, which is accessible off Silver Hill Rd. N.W. There are areas for passive use for birdwatchers, for example and lookout points with platforms. There are a number of river access points for fishing and swimming. Bowmont is part of an important wildlife corridor or green corridor in the city along with other city parks nearby, such as Nose Hill Park, Edworthy Park, Shouldice Park, Bowness Park, and Baker Park. Bowmont Park also includes Waterfall valley which runs from the south end of Silver Springs Boulevard to the river below.

One of the major new features is Dale Hodges Park—in east Bowmont Park—that was recently restored through a multi-year consultation, planning, design, and implementation of the East Bowmont Park Improvement Project. In 2010 the City acquired the former Klippert gravel pit, which was located along the northern bank of the Bow River, and highly visible from the escarpment above. By 2018, the gravel pit operation and other disturbed lands were in replaced with "wetlands, wet meadows, riparian shrubland and Balsam Poplar forest." The ecological integrity of the site was restored increasing the "bio-diversity index of one of the city's largest natural environment parks." The site was transformed into a structured series of upland native riparian habitats with recreation and park amenities including "stormwater wetlands, wildlife habitat, trails for cycling and walking, and lookout points across the scenic river valley".

== Bow River pathway ==
Bowmont Park can be reached on the paved Bow River pathway (BRP) or from points along the escarpment. On the north side of the river the Bow River pathway runs along the river edge from west to east from Baker Park to Bowmont Park. The pathway network runs through Bowness Park with its railway bridges and then through waterfall valley. From the higher elevations the railroad bridges to the low-lying Bowness Park and Baker Park are visible, as is the Stoney Trail bridge to the west, and the Canada Olympic Park which is just across the river. From waterfall valley the pathways lead east to Dale Hodges Park, which was previously known as east Bowmont Park. The next park on the Bow riverside pathway heading east, is at Bowness Park. This includes the 12.7 kilometer Baker and Bowmont Park Loop cycling trail. The three parks—Baker, Bowmont, and Bowness—which are technically separate are linked by two pedestrian bridges creating a larger interconnected park.

=== Waterfall Valley ===
A trailhead for Waterfall Valley is at the south end of Silver Springs Boulevard at the top of the escarpment. The waterfalls include spring-fed tufa waterfalls where run-off from communities on the hill outflows into the Bow River. A series of boardwalks and wooden stairs lead to the valley below where there is a viewing platform. According to the City of Calgary, "Below the sediments lies the bedrock called the Porcupine Hills Formation. This bedrock was formed about 65 million years ago. When water percolates down from the surface, through the sediments it absorbs calcium carbonate. As it strikes the bedrock it flows sideways and exits out the side of the valley resulting in the falls in Waterfall Valley. The water then deposits the calcium carbonate on the algae covered rocks, producing the tufa."

== Dale Hodges Park ==
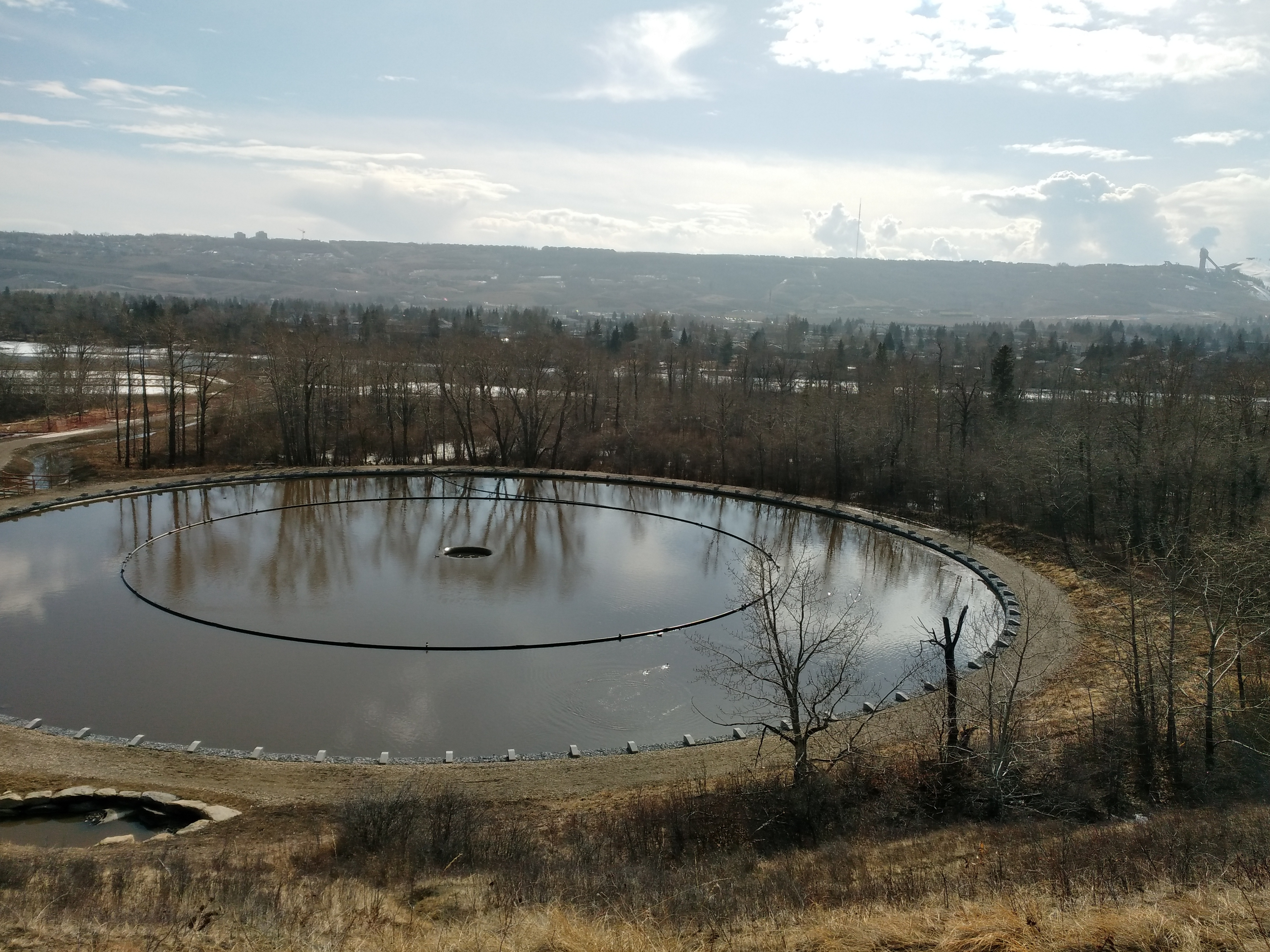
_{Nautilus Pond from the escarpment with Calgary Olympic Park in the background}

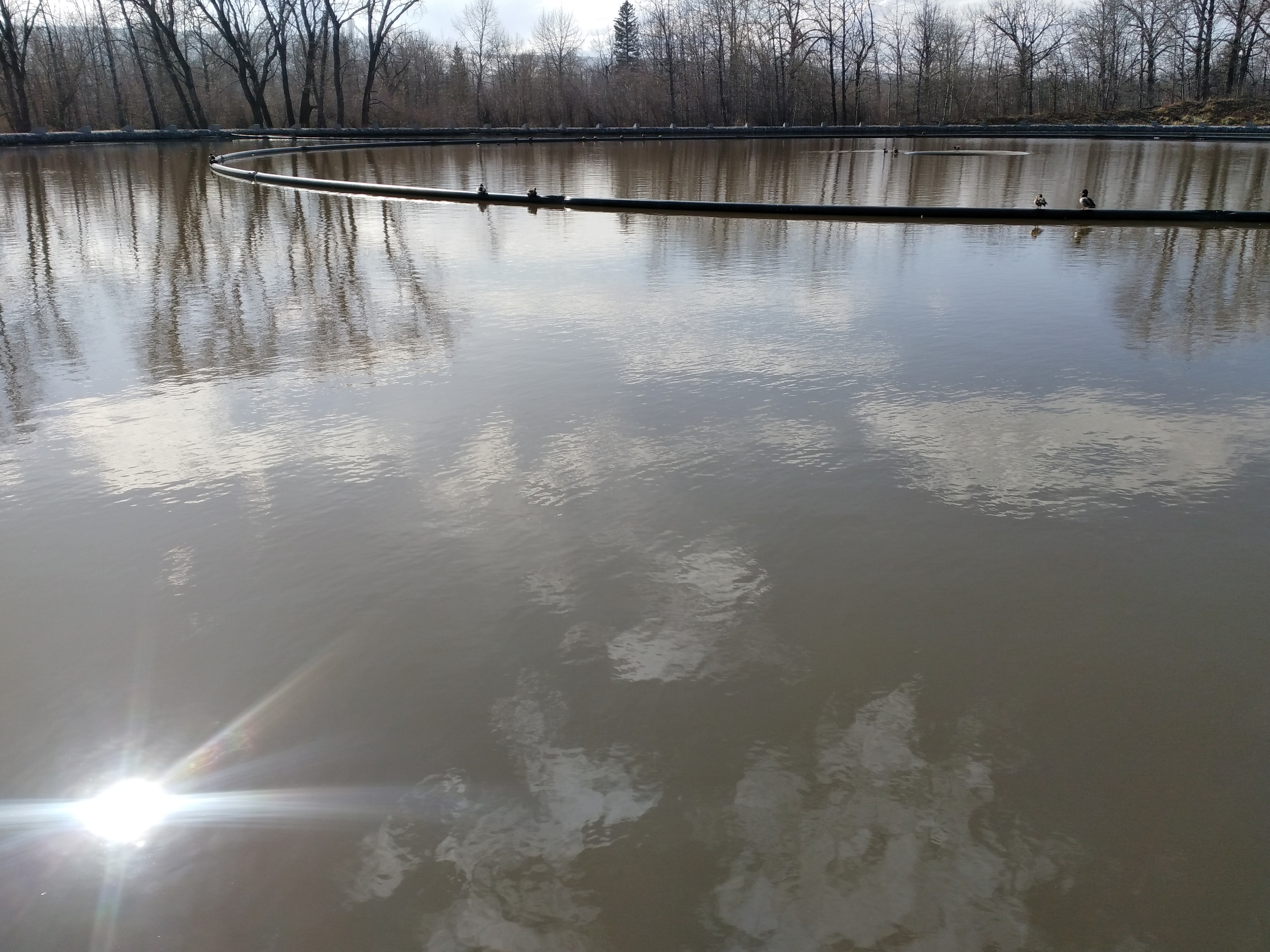
_{Large sediment particles are removed from the stormwater in the Pond draining system}

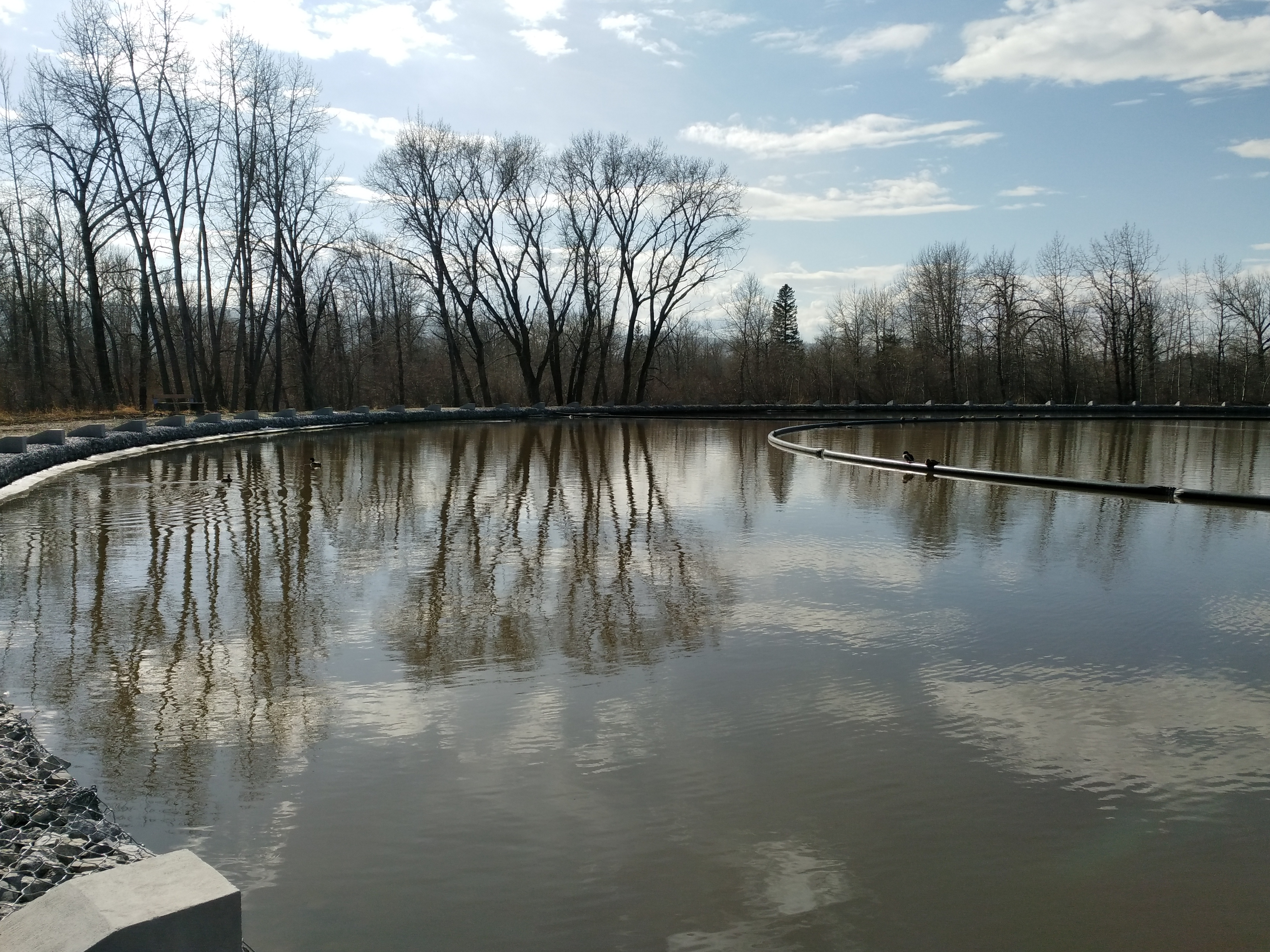

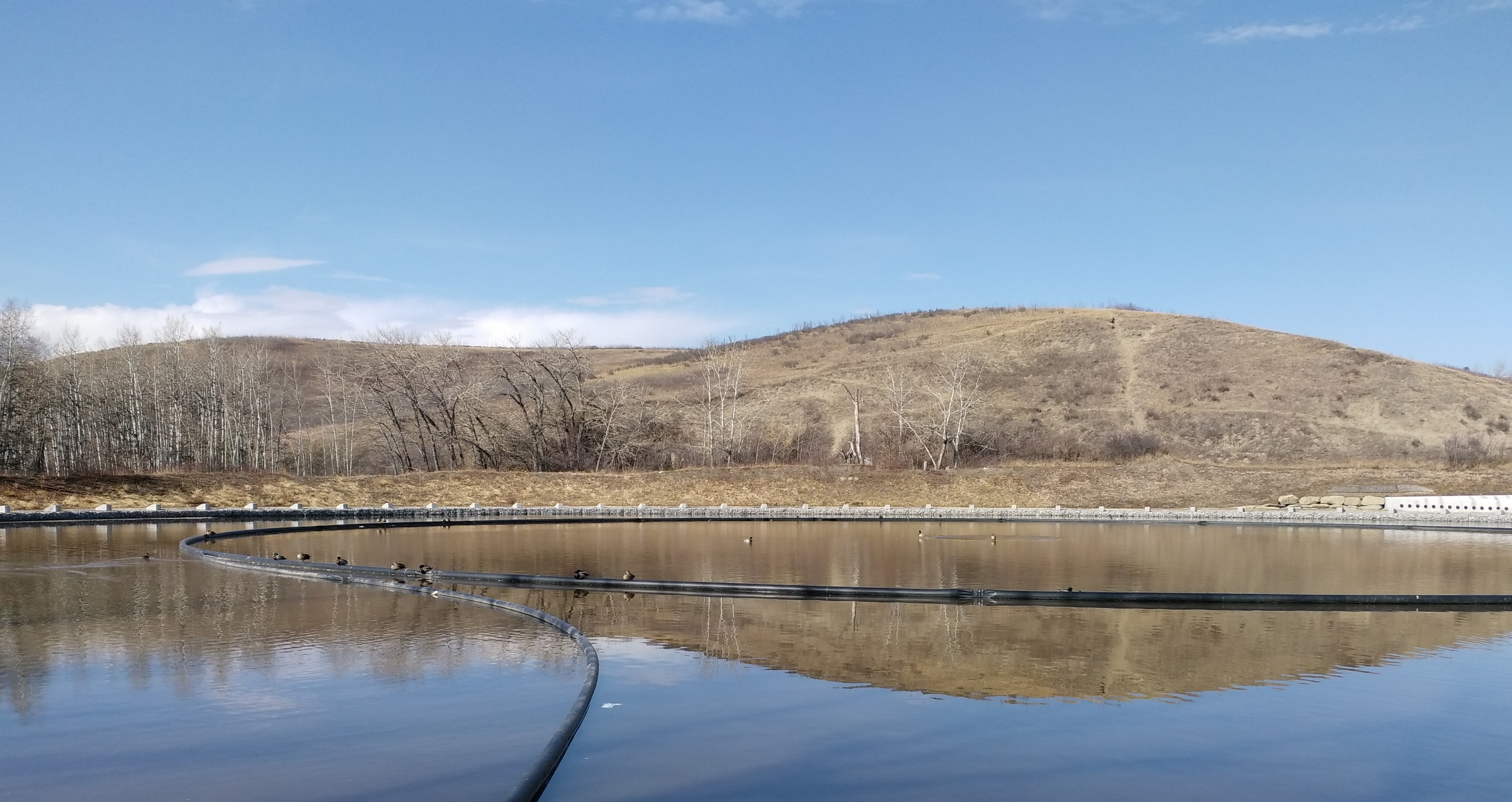
_{Nautilus Pond with mallard ducks in the spring.}

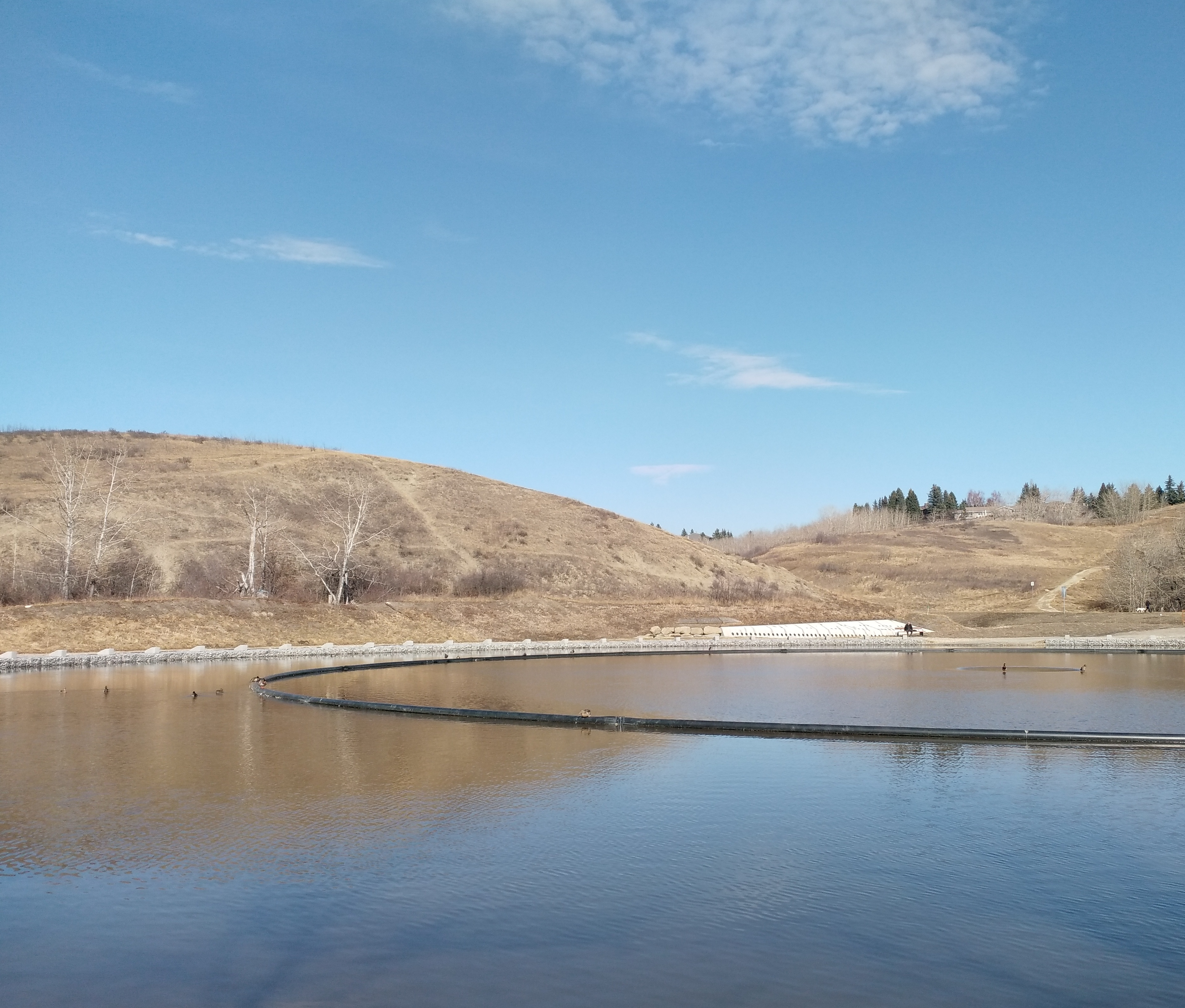

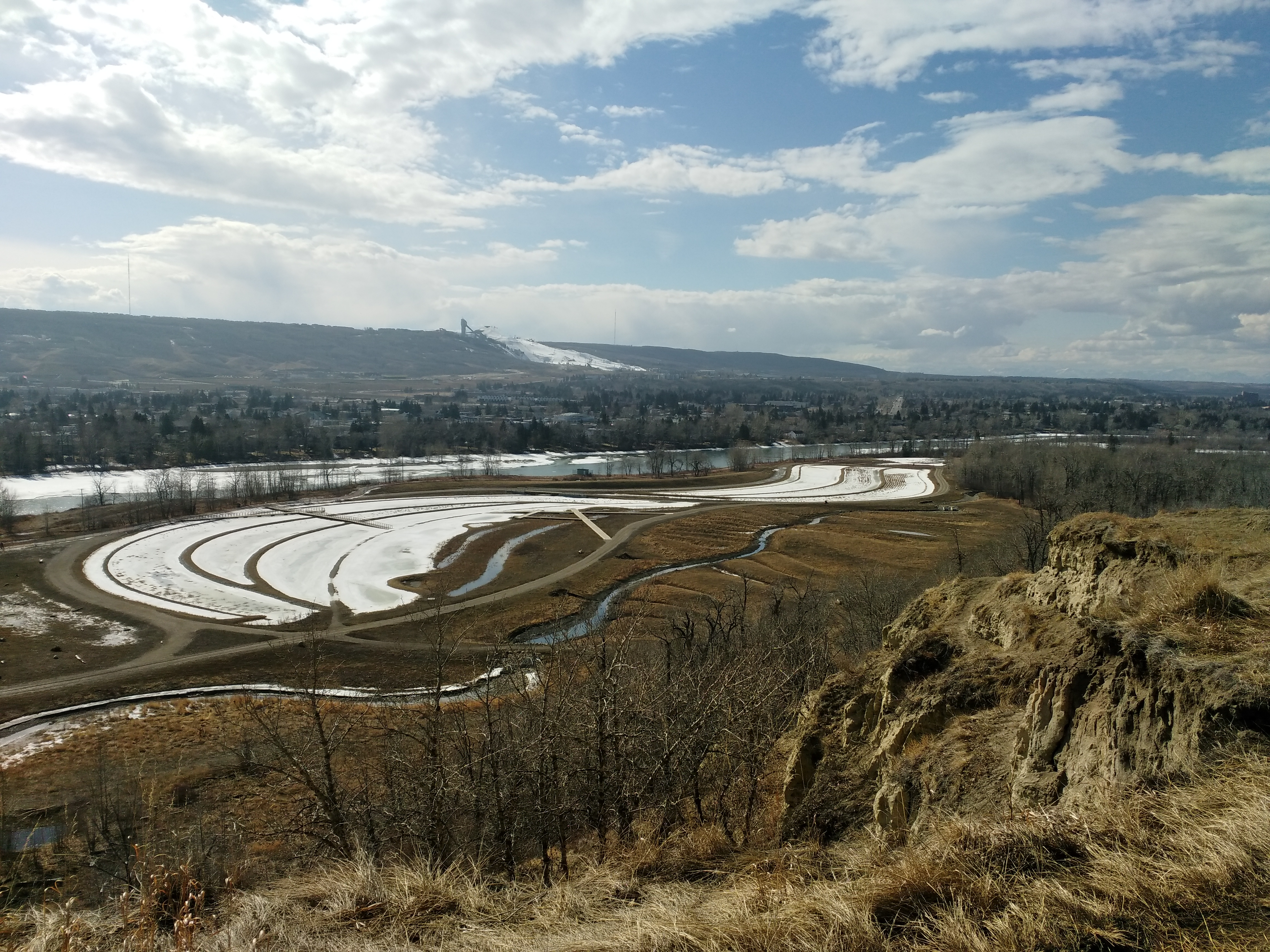
_{This clearly shows the polishing marshes, wet meadow, and the stream that carries the stormwater from the Nautilus Pond to the polishing marshes.}

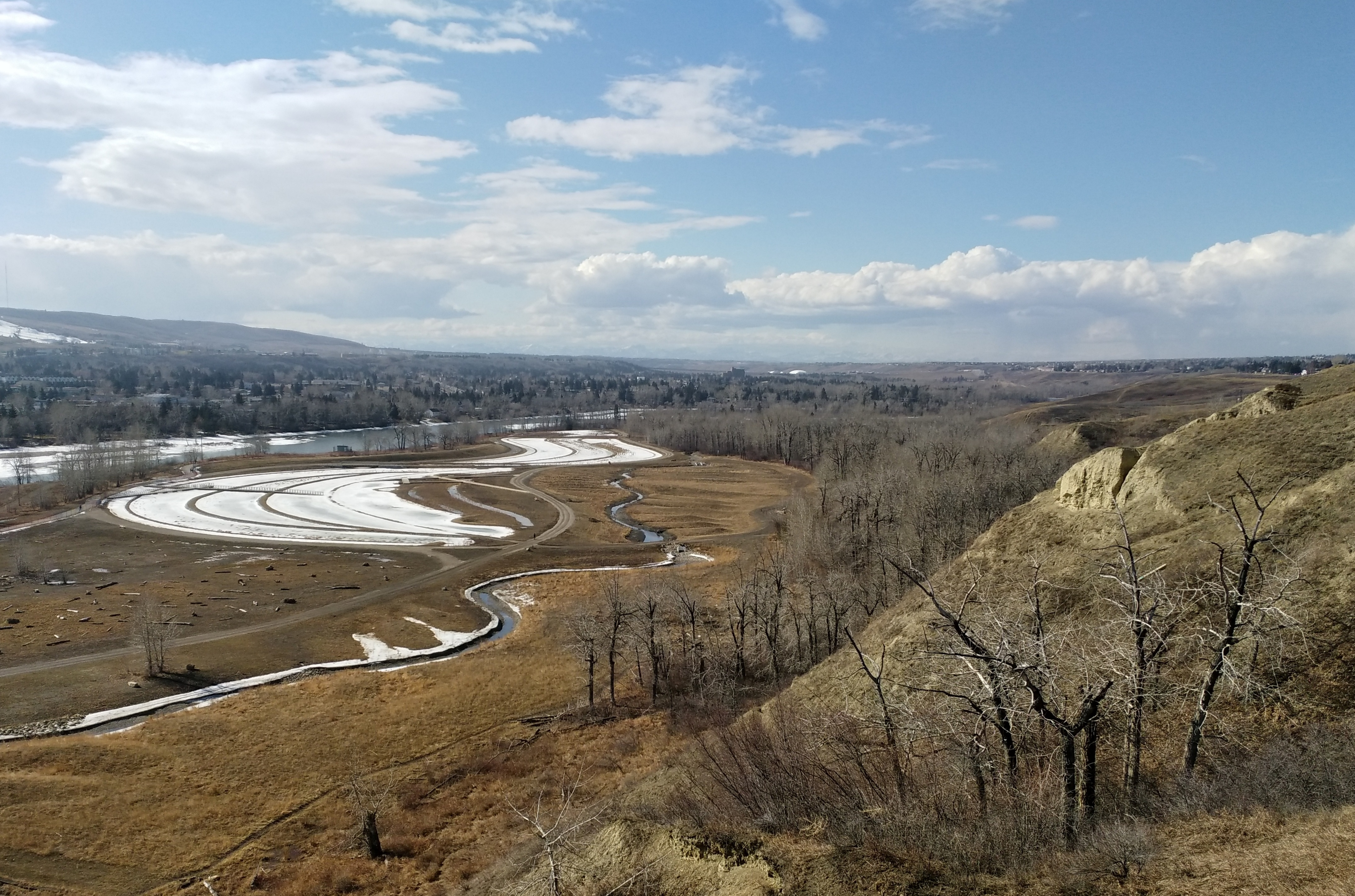
_{Dale Hodges Park in Bowmont Park.}

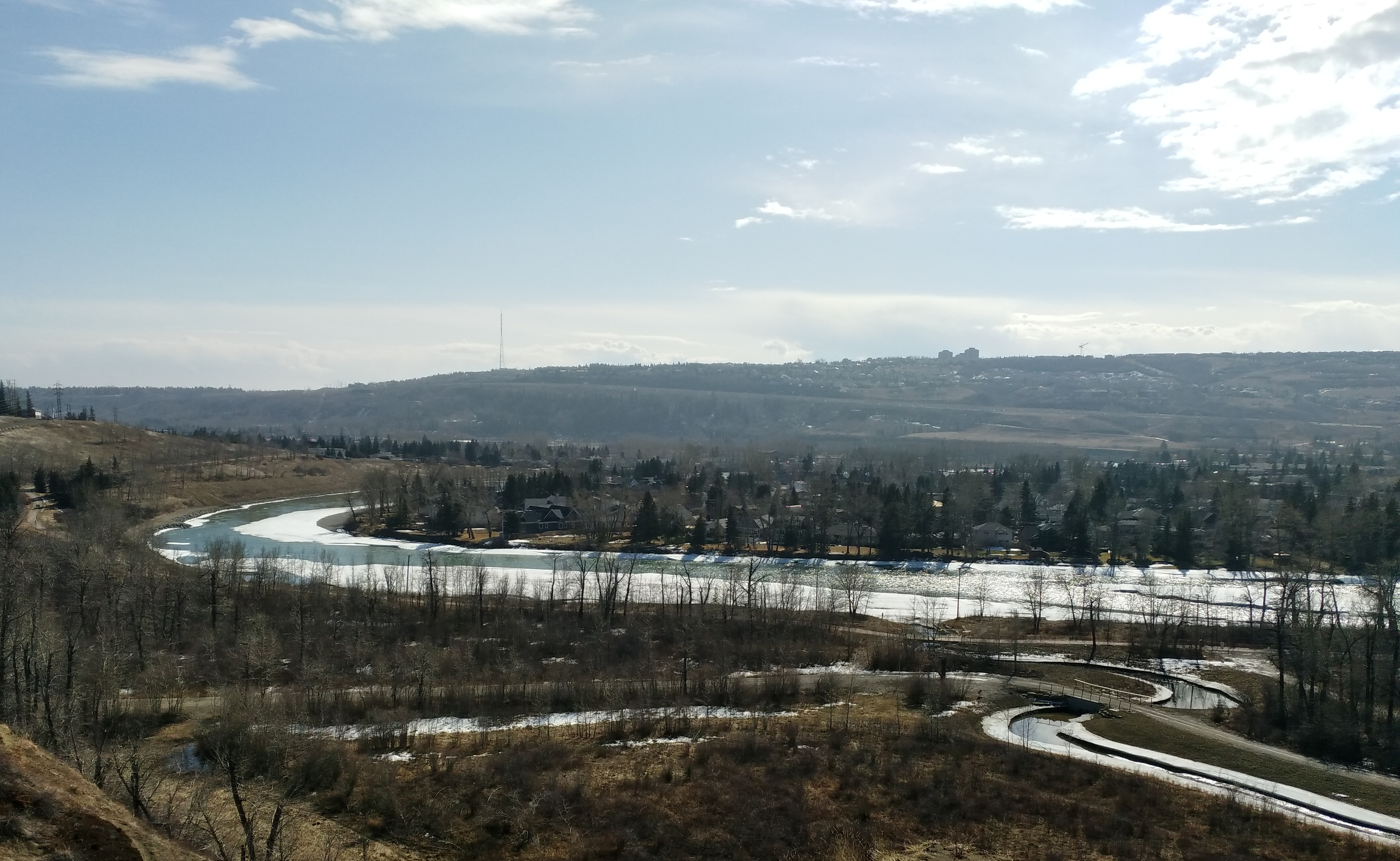
_{A view from the escarpment of Dales Hodges Park on the Bow River overlooking Bowness.}

Dale Hodges Park, formerly known as the East Bowmont Natural Environment Park (NEP), was renamed on April 5, 2017 by Calgary's City Council, to recognize Calgary's longest-serving member of council." (Note: Dale Hodges (born 1941) was Calgary City Council Alderman from 1983 until his retirement in 2013. Among his major projects he worked to protect and create Calgary parks including the east Bowmont Park which is now Dales Hodges Park, Nose Hill Park, and Baker Park. He also worked to establish the Enmax Legacy Parks Program to provide ongoing funds to maintain the parks.)

The park was expanded in 2010 to include East Bowmont when the City of Calgary acquired the Klippert gravel pit, a former gravel-mining pit which was run by Klippert for sixty years, at the east end of Bowmont Park. Prior to its expansion and transformation, in 2010, The Calgary Herald described it as "one of Calgary's biggest, prettiest and possibly least-known parks—a destination currently undergoing big changes itself. In a 2010 interview with the Herald, natural area management lead with the City of Calgary parks department, Chris Manderson, described how they created two "new wet ponds" which were educational and functional—the wet ponds "protect the Bow River by incorporating green stormwater treatment". In 2010, AECOM completed a scoping study.

Alongside the ecological restoration, one of the main focuses of the project was stormwater treatment before entering the Bow River. The design includes a Nautilus Pond, a polishing marsh, a wet meadow, a stream, outfall, a dry stream, riparian areas, and a lookout mound. The stormwater enters Dale Hodges Park through the Nautilus Pond which is located at the west of the Park. Large sediment particles are removed in the Pond draining system and the water moves slowly through polishing marsh area where wetland plants remove finer particles. A surface stream carries water from the Pond to the marsh. The stream also collects the wet meadow stormwater and "conveys it to the outfall". The lookout knoll is encircled by the marsh with sedge and willows growing nearby.The design for the "sculpted polishing marshes and wet meadows" created by Sans façon, O2 and S2S were inspired by anabranches. "An anabranch or meander scroll is a section of a river or stream that diverts from the main channel or stem of the watercourse and rejoins the main stem downstream. Local anabranches can be the result of small islands in the watercourse. In larger anabranches, the flow can diverge for a distance of several kilometers before rejoining the main channel." The 2012 and 2014 reports by O2 Planning + Design Inc noted that the contaminated soil from the gravel pit would be treated with phytoremediation.

In November 2015, the City of Calgary began work on developing the Natural Environment Park. The project incorporates "green stormwater treatment as a functional element of the park" with "stormwater wetlands" that provide wildlife habitat". The park has cycling and walking trails as well as scenic lookout points across the Bow River valley. By April 2014 Calgary's Recreations department said that the east Bowmont Park would become a natural environment park and would "incorporate stormwater treatment for a large northwest Calgary drainage catchment." The large area of nearly 4,500 hectares (11,000 acres) hectares is a "high priority as a stormwater quality retrofit project."

The transformation of the site, which incorporated "water engineering, public art, landscape architecture and ecological design", was the result of a collaboration between O2 Planning + Design, Source 2 Source Inc., Sans facon for Watershed+ and AECOM. The $2,006,000 project was scheduled to be completed in 2018. The design of the park includes innovative flood mitigation strategies, one of a number of initiatives to make Calgary more resilient.

== Fish habitat compensation ==
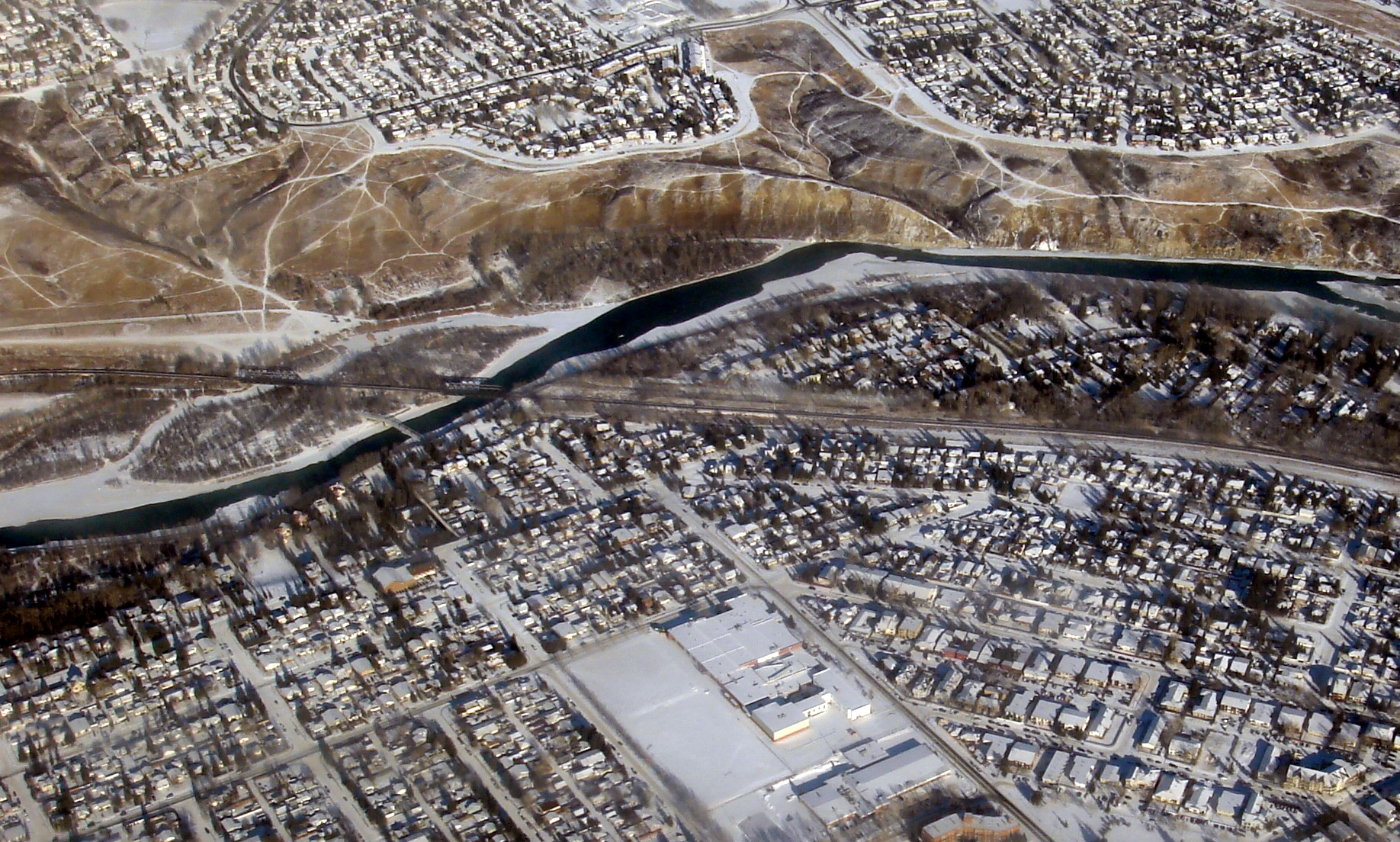
The main CPR railway crosses the Bow River in west Bowmont Park.

By July 18, 2018 the Bowmont West Fish Habitat Enhancement Project—Fish Habitat Compensation project—was underway in the west border of Bowmont Park which is east of 85 ST NW, near the CPR railway tracks. The Department of Fisheries and Oceans's (DFO) Fish Compensation program required the creation of healthy habitat for fish to replace some that was lost during riverbank repairs undertaken following the 2013 flood. Some fish habitat had been negatively affected by riverbank stabilization projects. The Project undertaken in 2018 included the "widening of a river side channel to allow water to flow through year-round" the removal and replacement of the pedestrian bridge on the north. (Note: The fish habitat compensation project is located near the western boundary of the park, east of 85 ST NW, south of Silver Spring Boulevard NW and southwest of Silver Crest NW. There is a main channel in the Bow River and three smaller channels. This is the area with the south pedestrian bridge and south CPR bridge.) This habitat site is near the area where the Canadian Pacific Railway main line cuts across the park, running parallel to the Bow River.

== Wildlife corridor ==
Bowmont Park is a part of an important wildlife corridor created by a series of closely linked city parks including Nose Hill Park to the east, Edworthy Park and Shouldice Park downstream from Bowmont Park, and Bowness Park and Baker Parks upstream.
