= Dale Hodges Park =

Park in Calgary, Alberta, Canada

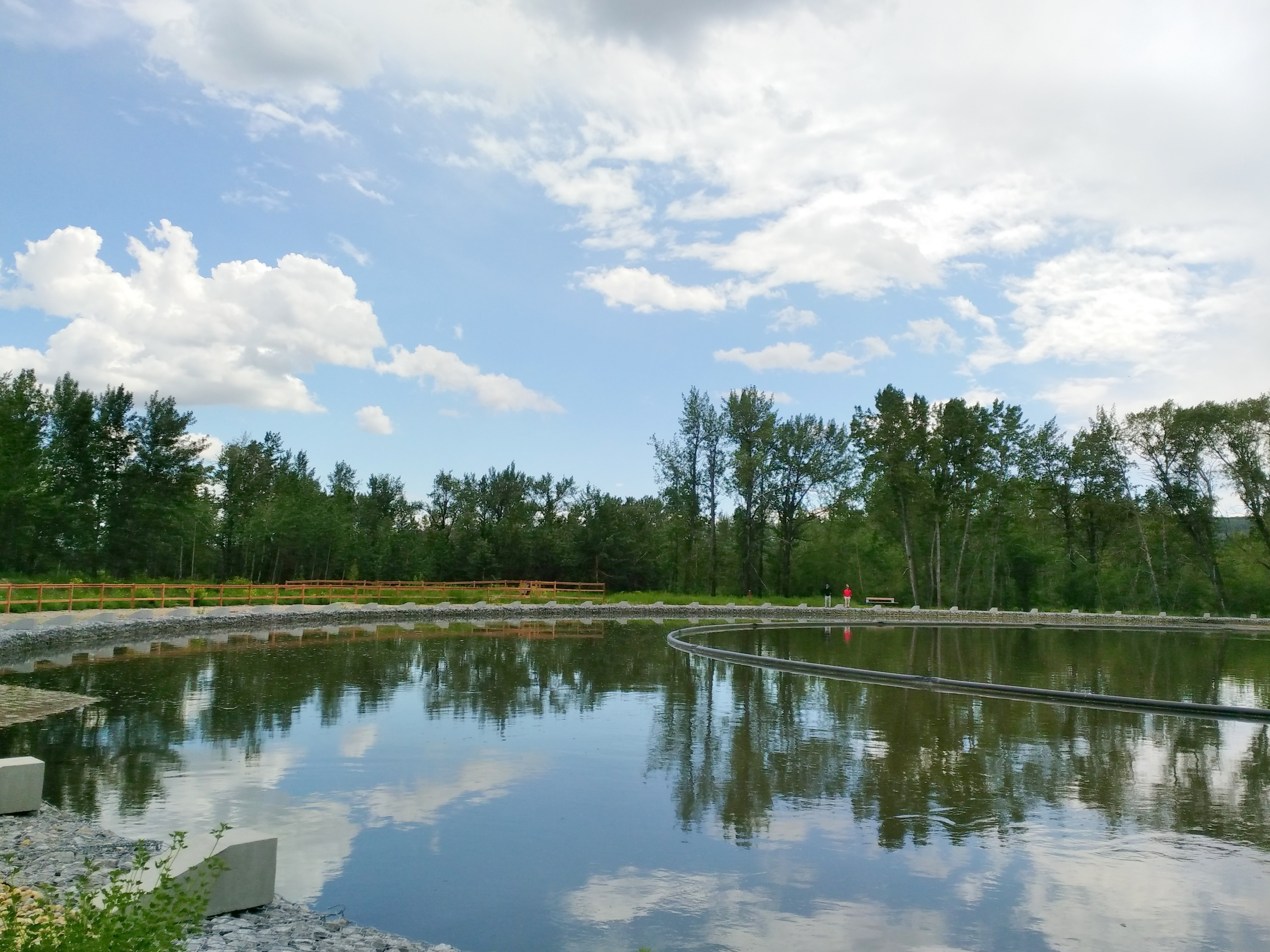
- Interactive map of Dale Hodges Park
- Type: Urban park, Stormwater Treatment Facility, Public Art
- Location: 2123 52nd Street N.W. between 40th Avenue N.W. and the Bow RiverBowness and Montgomery, Calgary West of Market Mall
- Nearest city: Calgary, Alberta
- Coordinates: 51°05′27″N 114°10′40″W (Note: The Google Maps coordinates are for the Nautilus Pond.)
- Area: 100 acres (0.40 km^{2})
- Operator: City of Calgary

Dale Hodges Park is a 40.5 hectares (100 acres) natural environment urban park, stormwater treatment, and public artwork installation in northwest Calgary, Alberta. It is an expansion of Bowmont Park, where stormwater from eight northwest upstream residential communities flows slowly through "water structures and landforms" inspired by "natural river morphology as well as hydrologic and sedimentation processes" that serve as filters. The park, which is connected to the regional pathway, has a boardwalk, cycling and walking trails, the Nautilus Pond, a polishing marsh, a wet meadow, man-made streams, vantage points of the Bow River, and wildlife habitat.

The $26.8 million project to "restore native riparian habitats" of the contaminated Klippert gravel pit, then known as the East Bowmont Natural Environment Park (NEP), began in 2010. It was completed in the fall of 2018 and officially opened to the public on June 26, 2019, following a ceremony in which Mayor Naheed Nenshi dedicated the park to Dale Hodges, in recognition of his many contributions to Calgary as the longest service member of council. Alderman Hodges was active for 30 years—from 1983 to 2013—"protecting and creating Calgary's green spaces".

== Features ==
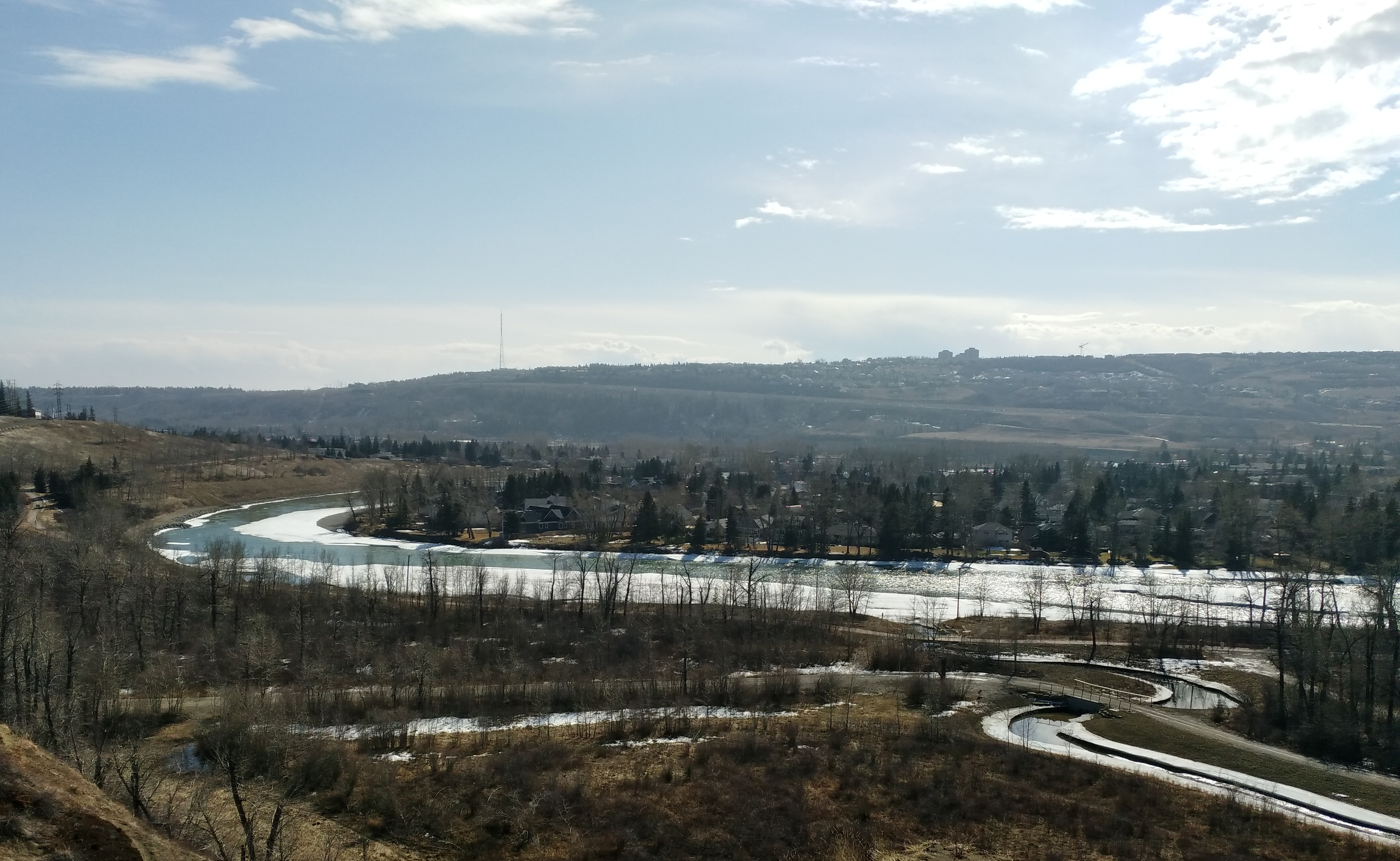
_{Overlooking Bowness.}

"Once a gravel quarry, the site is now a fully integrated 40-hectare park, stormwater treatment facility, and one of the largest public artworks in North America. The park concept follows the journey of stormwater through a series of curated experiences, collaboratively designed with The City's Parks, Water Resources and Public Art departments, emphasizing the flow of water through the landscape."

— Canadian Society of Landscape Architects, Dale Hodges Park, 2021 Jury's Award of Excellence & Large-Scale Public Landscapes

A City of Calgary press release described the Park as a "one-of-a-kind", "beautiful stormwater treatment facility" that filters and treats stormwater through a combination of natural and man-made processes. One of the main focuses of the project was to improve the underground storm drain system of stormwater collected from eight northwest communities, including Silver Springs and Varsity. Before the creation of Dale Hodges Park, stormwater from these communities, representing nearly 1,800 hectares (4,400 acres), ran through underground storm drains in the gravel pit, directly into the Bow River. According to a June 26, 2019 City of Calgary press release, Dale Hodges Park "is one of a kind in North America in the way that it is designed to handle and filter the stormwater...The park's proximity to the river presented a rare and unique opportunity to protect the Bow River ...as it is estimated that the annual sediment loads to the Bow River from this area will be reduced by 50%."

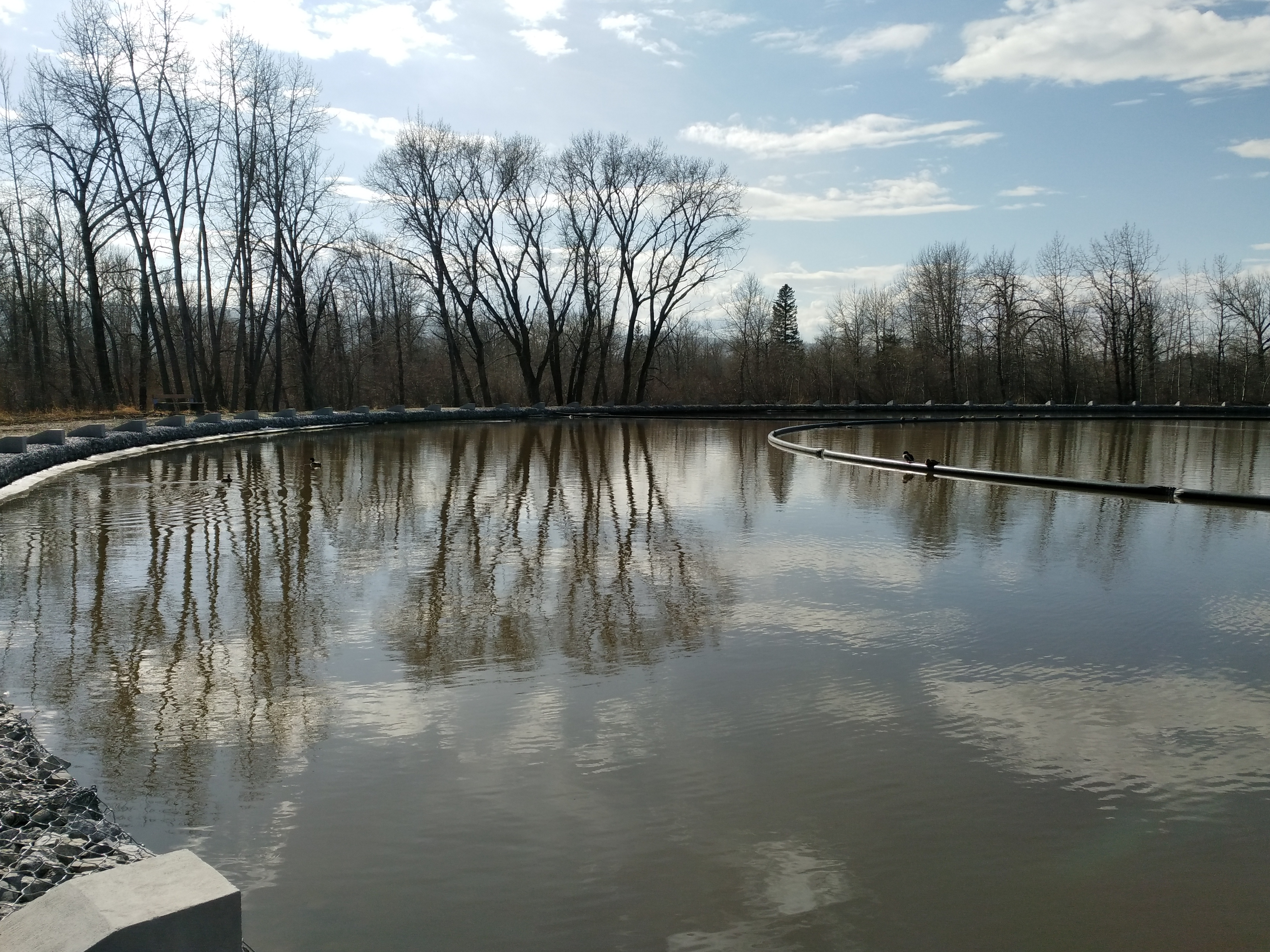
Nautlius Pond

According to the lead artists of Watershed+, who led the conceptual design for the park, "the stormwater treatment is looked on as an opportunity, to help define the park's character and create a specific environment. Instead of an unapparent and visually disconnected treatment system, the journey of the stormwater throughout the park participates in the creation of different habitats. Open water, running water, marshland, riparian, wet meadows, etc: all at once the stormwater is creating habitat, being cleaned and expressing the process at work." The overall layout was informed by the journey of the stormwater through the site. The visibility of that stormwater treatment process invites viewers to consider the relationship between the city and the environment.

The design includes a Nautilus Pond, a polishing marsh, a wet meadow, a stream, outfall, a dry stream, riparian areas, and a lookout mound. The polishing marshes, wet meadow, and a surface stream carry the stormwater from the Nautilus Pond to the polishing marshes. The stream also collects the wet meadow stormwater and "conveys it to the outfall". The lookout knoll is encircled by the marsh with sedge and willows growing nearby. Residential snow and rain runoff travels through pipes then resurfaces in the Nautilus Pond which is located at the west of the Park. Large sediment particles are removed in the pond draining system which "swirls the water before dropping it down a halo drain".

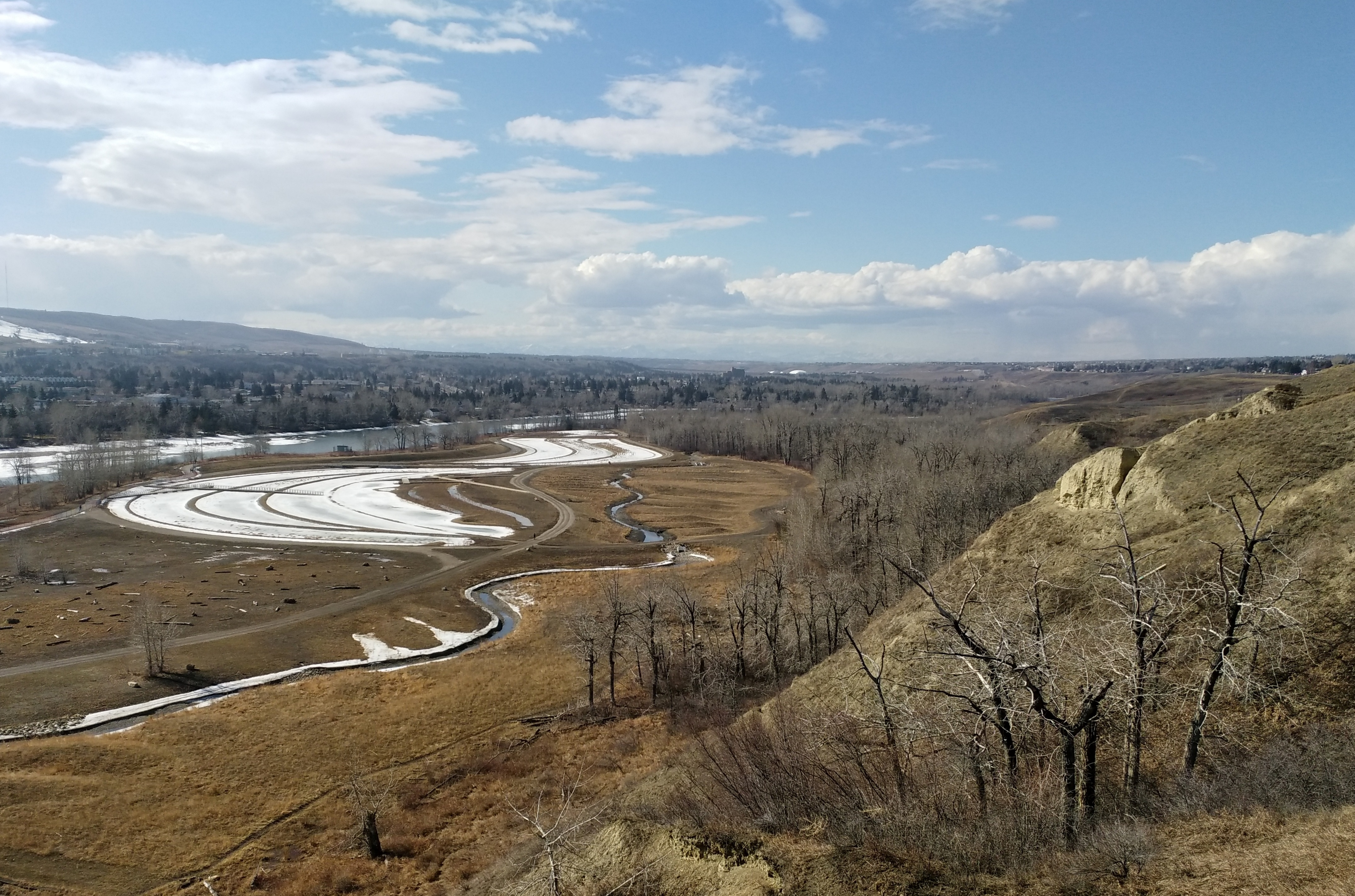
Polishing marsh

The water moves slowly through meandering man-made side streams in the polishing marsh area where wetland plants remove finer particles. The water flows through "cells" in the park "stopping at various river banks" that "polish" the water before it enters the Bow River. The design for the park was a collaboration by O2 Planning + Design, Source 2 Source Inc., and led by Sans façon for Watershed+. According to the February 2014 East Bowmont NEP Design Development Plan, the collaborators for the landscape design alongside the stream in part drew their inspiration from the "unique riparian phenomenon" known as anabranches, or "meander[ing] scrolls, which are sections of streams that divert from and then rejoin the main channel of a watercourse. Thousands of trees, bushes and native plants were planted and seeded as part of the restoration process using phytoremediation to treat the contaminated soil from the gravel pit. (Note: In their 2012 and 2014 reports, O2 Planning + Design Inc said that phytoremediation would be used to treat the contaminated soil from the gravel pit.)

According to O2 Planning + Design, the "final outflow stream discharges to an important trout habitat area, designed to serve as refuge during river flood conditions".

== Collaborators ==
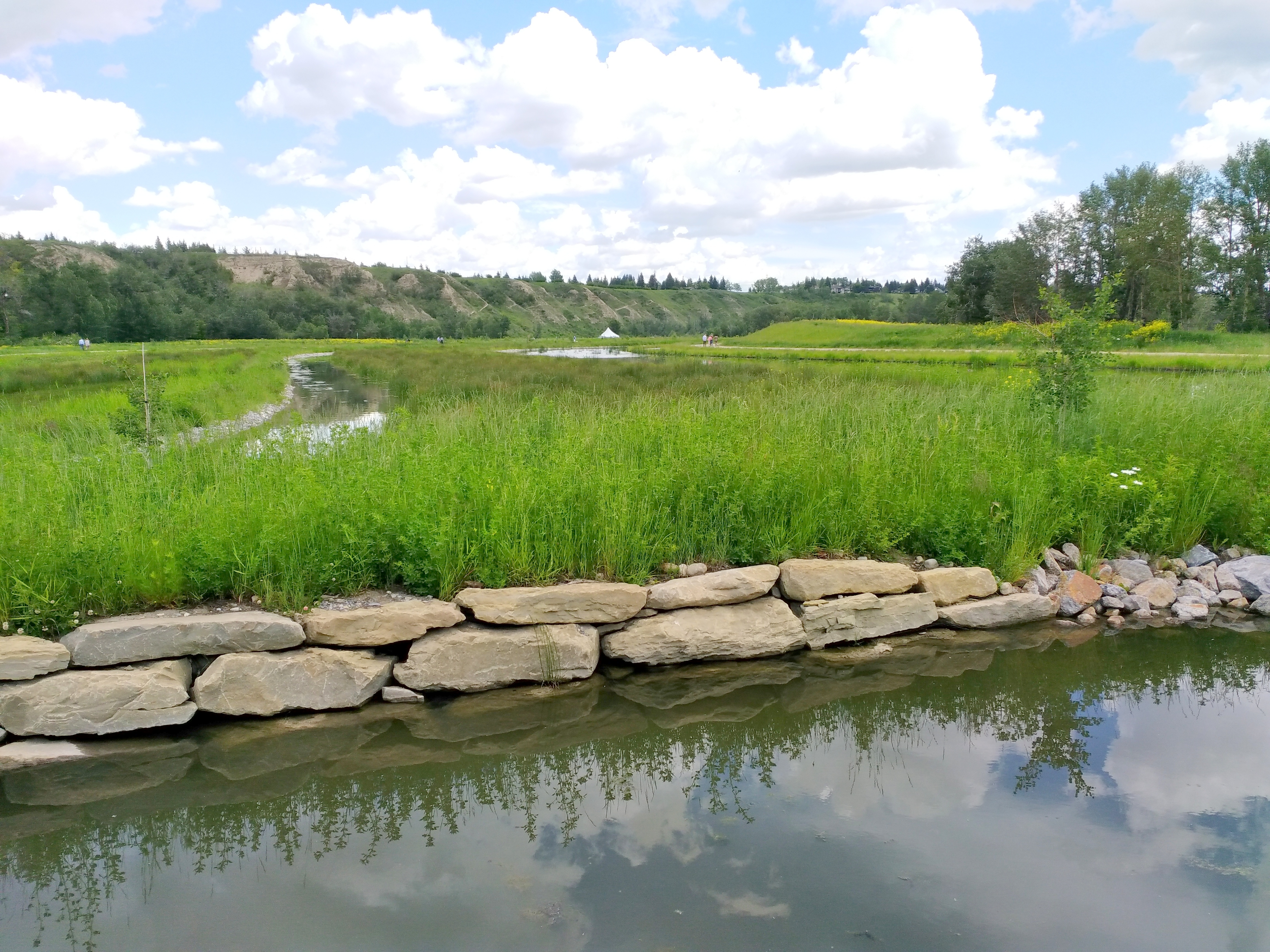

"To bridge the two design intents —one informed by ecological restoration of the landscape, the other with water resource engineering— [the artists Sans façon] lead the conceptual development of the project and fostered a collaborative design approach between City departments (Water, Parks, Public art) and the consultants (O2 Planning+Design, Source2Source and AECOM)."

The transformation of the site, which incorporated "water engineering, public art, landscape architecture and ecological design", was the result of a collaboration between O2 Planning + Design, Source 2 Source Inc., and AECOM., led by Sans façon for Watershed+. (Note: Sans façon is a collaborative partnership that began in Glasgow c. 2001 between the English artist Tristan Surtees and French architect Charles Blanc and established in Calgary in 2008. Surtees and Blanc developed and led Watershed+, which is a public art program operating out of the City of Calgary's Department of Utilities and Environmental Protection (UEP) since 2007. Watershed+ embeds artists and "creative practice" into water management in Calgary, connecting Calgarians emotionally to the Bow River watershed. In 2016, Sans façon also worked on Seattle's Combined Sewer Overflow (CSO) project. According to a November 1, 2014 article in Avenue Calgary, Surtees and Blanc, who were included in Calgary's Top 40 under 40, had created Watershed+ in 2009 as a proposal for UEP's Public Art funding. By 2014, Watershed+ had over 20 projects.) Wilco Southwest undertook the construction. The City of Calgary departments involved in the project include Calgary Parks, Water Resources and Public art teams City of Calgary Arts and Culture.

"The involvement of Lead Artists began from day one as part of the design team. Watershed+ initiated an integrated collaborative process between different departments of the City of Calgary (UEP and Parks), consultants and Watershed+ Lead Artists, to expand the possibilities of the connection and understanding of the stormwater treatment system within the park design." According the Carolyn Bowen, Manager of Watershed Planning, City of Calgary, the involvement of the lead artists at the onset of the project "provides that opportunity right at the beginning to set the stage for a different type of project and bring in that creative thought and that sets a stage for a very unique opportunity."

In the February 27, 2013 article in Canadian Art, the City of Calgary's Department of Utilities and Environmental Protection (UEP) created its own public art plan as a result of the city's establishment in 2004 of the City of Calgary's Public Art Program. (Note: According to a February 27, 2013 article in Canadian Art the City of Calgary's Public Art Program devotes 1 per cent "of all project costs for municipal capital projects over one million dollars" to public art. By 2013, the collective Sans façon had two commissions with UEP.)

Dale Hodges Park is part of a larger series of initiatives undertaken by the City of Calgary for stormwater management strategies.

== Wildlife corridor ==
Dale Hodges Park provides habitat for wildlife and is part of Bowmont Park's wildlife corridor connecting Nose Hill Park to the east, Edworthy Park and Shouldice Park downstream from Bowmont Park, and Bowness Park and Baker Parks upstream.

== History ==
Bowmont Park was expanded with the addition of the land at the east end of the park, formerly used as a gravel-mining pit, which the City of Calgary had acquired in 2010, to "restore the area's ecological integrity while improving the underground storm drain system." The Klippert gravel pit, a former gravel-mining pit was run by Klippert Concrete for sixty years. The area was temporarily named the East Bowmont Natural Environment Park (NEP). The City hired AECOM to undertake a scoping study, which was completed in 2010.

One of the first projects in the transformation of the area from gravel pit to a restored natural area, was the proposed creation of two "new wet ponds". The wet ponds, which were both educational and functional, serve to "protect the Bow River by incorporating green stormwater treatment", according to Chris Manderson, natural area management lead with the City of Calgary parks department.

By April 2014 Calgary's Recreations department said that the East Bowmont Natural Environment Park (NEP) would become a natural environment park and would "incorporate stormwater treatment for a large northwest Calgary drainage catchment." The NEP was designated as a "high priority as a stormwater quality retrofit project."

In November 2015, the City of Calgary began the actual physical work of developing the Natural Environment Park. The project incorporates "green stormwater treatment as a functional element of the park" with "stormwater wetlands" that provide wildlife habitat".

On April 25, 2017, Calgary's City Council officially renamed East Bowmont Natural Environment Park (NEP) Dale Hodges Park, in recognition of the many contributions to the city made by Alderman Dale Hodges, who had served Calgary from 1983 to 2013, making him Calgary's longest-serving member of council.

The $26.8 million project was completed in the fall of 2018, and was officially opened by the Mayor of Calgary on June 26, 2019, at the dedication of the park to Dale Hodges.

Dale Hodges Park received the 2020 Alberta Emerald Foundation Shared Footprints Award and the 2021 Canadian Society of Landscape Architects Jury's Award of Excellence & Large-Scale Public Landscapes.

== Dale Hodges ==
Dale Hodges served as Calgary City Council Ward 1 Alderman for thirty years—from 1983 until his retirement in 2013. In April 2017 the city council surprised Hodges with the news that they had unanimously agreed to rename East Bowmont Park as Dale Hodges Park. Hodges worked extensively to protect and create parks including Nose Hill Park, Baker Park, and Dale Hodges Park. He also worked towards the establishment of the Enmax Legacy Parks Program which provides ongoing funds to maintain the parks.
