= Dale Hodges =

Canadian politician (1941–2023)

Alderman Dale Hodges

Calgary City Council
- In office 1983–2013
- Succeeded by: Ward Sutherland
- Constituency: Ward 1

Personal details
- Born: John Dale Hodges; May 19, 1941 Saskatchewan, Canada
- Died: December 31, 2023 (aged 82) Calgary, Alberta, Canada
- Spouse: Yvonne

John Dale Hodges (May 19, 1941 – December 31, 2023) was a Canadian municipal-level politician in Calgary, Alberta, who served as Calgary City Council Ward 1 Alderman for thirty years—from 1983 until his retirement in 2013. The east Bowmont Park was renamed the Dale Hodges Park in recognition of his many contributions to the city as "Calgary’s longest-serving member of council" including his role in protecting and creating parks such as east Bowmont Park, Nose Hill Park, and Baker Park and the establishment of the Enmax Legacy Parks Program.

== Early life ==
Hodges was born in Saskatchewan on May 19, 1941. His family moved to Alberta when he was five. He lived in Calgary from 1952 and in northwest Calgary from 1975.

== Early career ==
Hodges worked as a librarian with the Calgary Public Library from 1967 to 1983.

== Tenure as Alderman ==
I knew I’d be around a while but I never thought I’d be here for 30 years. Every term in office you try to get the things that are important for the area accomplished.

— Dale Hodges. 2013. Calgary Herald

The area he served—Ward 1—includes the communities of Bowness, Canada Olympic Park, Crestmont, Greenwood Village/Green Briar, Montgomery, Rocky Ridge, Scenic Acres, Silver Springs, Tuscany, University of Calgary, University Heights, Valley Ridge, and Varsity.

In 1983, when he was first elected, Ralph Klein was mayor. Over the next thirty years, Hodges "served alongside five mayors and 50 aldermen." During that period "Calgary hosted the 1988 Winter Olympics and expanded numerous urban parks including Nose Hill Park and Baker Park as well as recreation facilities. The 1988 Winter Olympics, Baker Park and the "long-awaited northwest LRT" built during Hodges' tenure, are considered to be among his career highlights.

== Dale Hodges Park ==
On April 25, 2017, the City of Calgary announced that east Bowmont Park would be renamed the Dale Hodges Park to recognize Hodges' contributions to the city as "Calgary’s longest-serving member of council". Among other accomplishments, Hodges was honoured for his work defending Calgary's green-spaces. This included the reclamation of the former concrete pit site into east Bowmont Park and for his contribution to protecting Nose Hill Park. He was also recognized for his role in ongoing funding for city parks through the Enmax Legacy Parks Program.

As part of the Park, the former Klippert gravel pit, which was located along the northern bank of the Bow River, was transformed into a structured series of upland native riparian habitats with recreation and park amenities including "stormwater wetlands, wildlife habitat, trails for cycling and walking, and lookout points across the scenic river valley". One of the main focuses of the project was stormwater treatment before entering the Bow River.

== Personal life and death ==
Hodges lived in his Bowness home on the Bow River, which had been built in 1961, until the 2013 Alberta floods. Hodges was instrumental in having a Bowness Hells Angels clubhouse demolished. In 2001, Hodges was a court witness against a former member of the Hells Angels charged with conspiring to blow up the alderman's home in Bowness.

Hodges died at a hospice in Calgary on December 31, 2023, at the age of 82.

Political offices
Preceded by Marguerite Patricia "Pat" Donnelly	Calgary Alderman Ward 1; 1983–2013	Succeeded by Ward Sutherland
