= MacEwan Glen =

- Neighbourhood
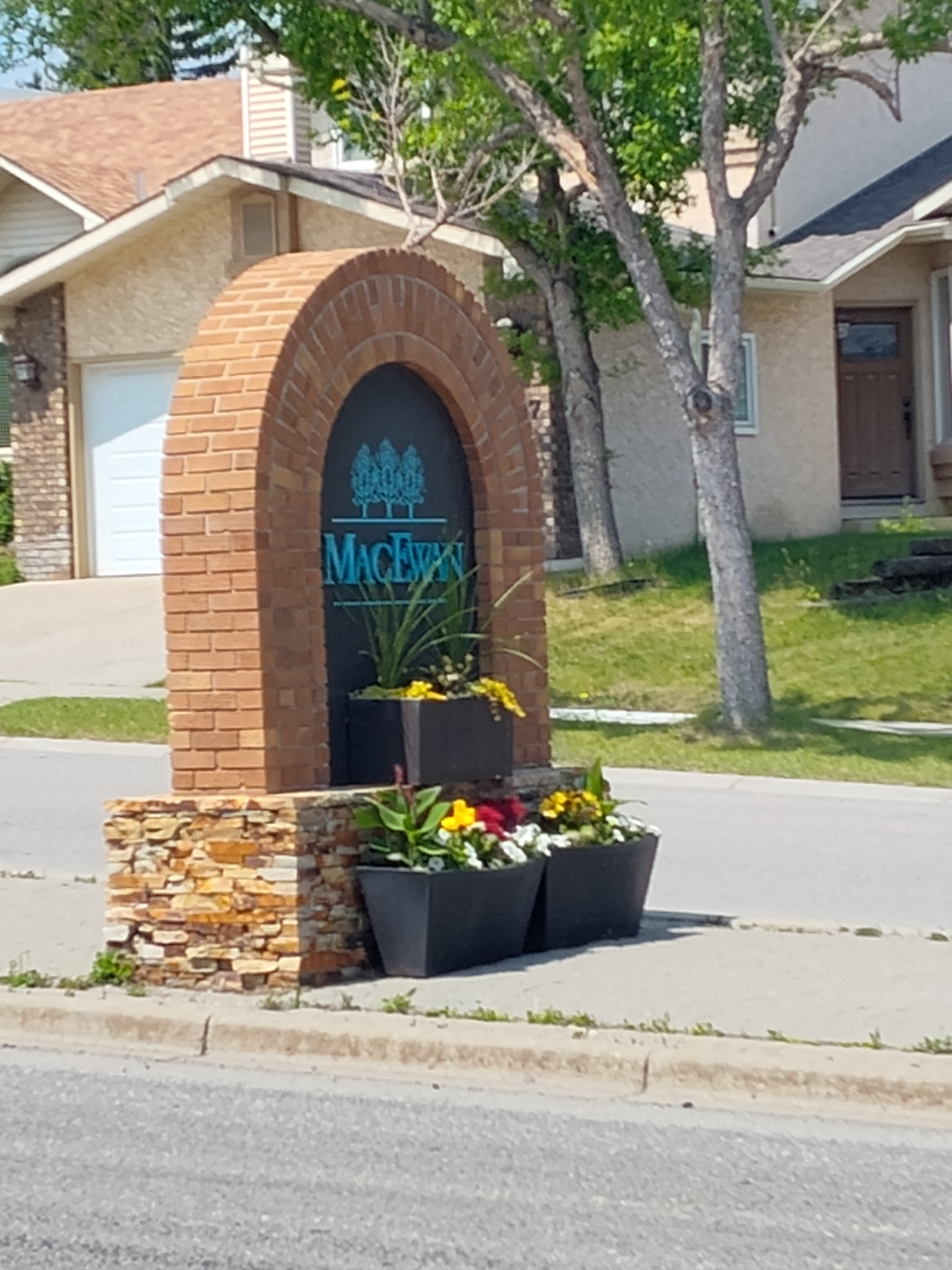
- Signage for the community

- Location of MacEwan Glen in Calgary
- Coordinates: 51°07′55″N 114°06′30″W
- Country: Canada
- Province: Alberta
- City: Calgary
- Quarant: NW
- Ward: 3
- Established: 1978

Government
  - Mayor: Jeromy Farkas
  - Administrative body: Calgary City Council
  - Councillor: Andrew Yule (Independent)
- Elevation: 1,150 m (3,770 ft)

Population (2016)
  - Total: 5,055
  - Average Income: $119,998
- Website: MacEwan Community Association

MacEwan Glen (commonly known as MacEwan) is a neighbourhood in northwest Calgary, Alberta, Canada. The primarily low-density residential community is the only community that is directly attached to Nose Hill Park and is bounded by Country Hills Boulevard to the north, 14 Street NW to the east, Shaganappi Trail to the west, and Nose Hill Park to the south.

Development of the community began in 1978, and was completed in the late 1990s. It was named for John Walter Grant MacEwan, Calgary mayor and Lieutenant Governor of Alberta. It is represented in the Calgary City Council by the Ward 3 councillor, Jasmine Mian.

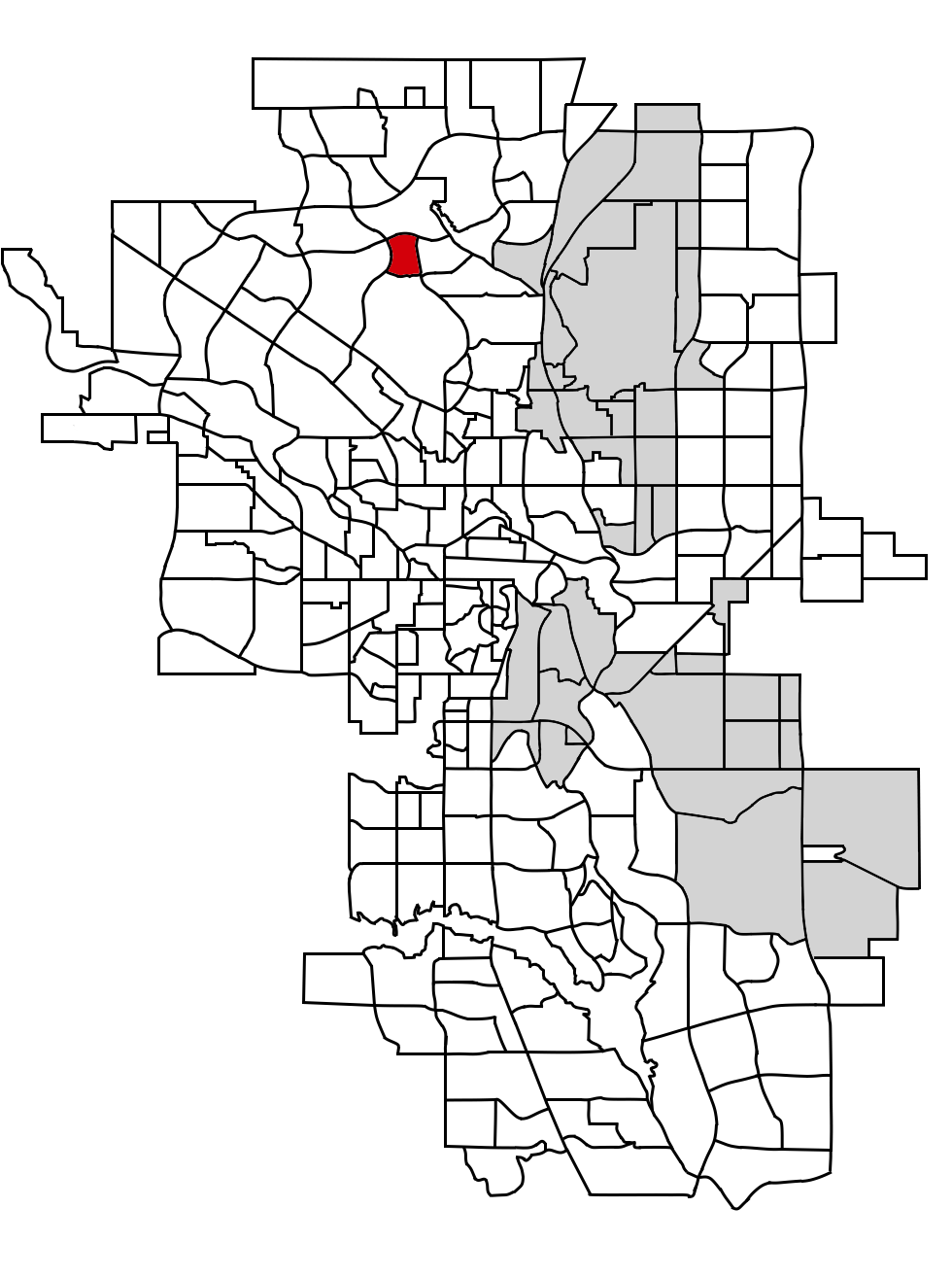
Location of MacEwan Glen in Calgary

== Demographics ==
In the City of Calgary's 2012 municipal census, MacEwan Glen had a population of 5,100 living in 1,781 dwellings, a -0.7% increase from its 2011 population of 5,138. With a land area of 1.4 km^{2} (0.54 sq mi), it had a population density of 3,640/km^{2} (9,400/sq mi) in 2012.

As of 2016, the total population of MacEwan Glen was 5,055 with a median household income of $119,998. As of 2016, 23% of the residents were immigrants compared to the City of Calgary average of 31%.

== Education ==
The community of MacEwan Glen is served by Monsignor N. Anderson Elementary School, Simons Valley Elementary School, Sir John A. Macdonald School, and Queen Elizabeth High School.

== See also ==
- List of neighbourhoods in Calgary
