= John Hextall =

John Hextall was a landowner who founded the community of Bowness, now part of Calgary, Alberta, Canada.

== Early life ==
John Hextall was born in 1861 at Canonbury House in Islington, London, England, the fourth child of a wealthy silk merchant. After training as a solicitor, he married Alice Delphine Dunn in 1884 and the couple had three children, Alice Violet, Maud Eleanor and Leonard John. In 1908, perhaps for health reasons, Hextall brought his family to Calgary, Alberta, Canada, where at first he began ranching with a partner, Frank Shackle.

== Bowness Estates ==
In 1908, Hextall bought the Bowness Ranche (not to be confused with the Bow Valley Ranche), a tract of land of 2481.65 acres situated a few miles west of Calgary on the banks of the Bow River. The purchase price was "$94,000 and no more" and Hextall received title on August 4, 1910.

At this time, thanks to the recently arrived Canadian Pacific Railway, Calgary was a fast-growing community of 44,000 with a booming real estate market. Hextall quickly saw the possibility of developing his ranch into a garden suburb for the wealthy who would be able to live in country homes along the banks of the river in close proximity to the city. He subdivided part of his land, built a bridge, and got the City of Calgary to run its streetcar line across the bridge into his development, which he called Bowness Estates. In return, he donated two islands on the Bow to the City, for use as a park.

Despite an aggressive advertising campaign, and many improvements to the property, including a golf club, Bowness Estates never took off. First there was a slump in the economy, then the first world war broke out.

Hextall died on April 19, 1914, and is buried in the Union Cemetery in Calgary. The area he had subdivided eventually became the village, then the town of Bowness, which grew rapidly after the second world war and was annexed by the City of Calgary in 1963. The bridge he built in 1911 still stands. Used now for pedestrian and bicycle traffic it was officially named the John Hextall Bridge in 1986.
