= Bowness Park, Calgary =

Park in Calgary, Canada

Bowness Park
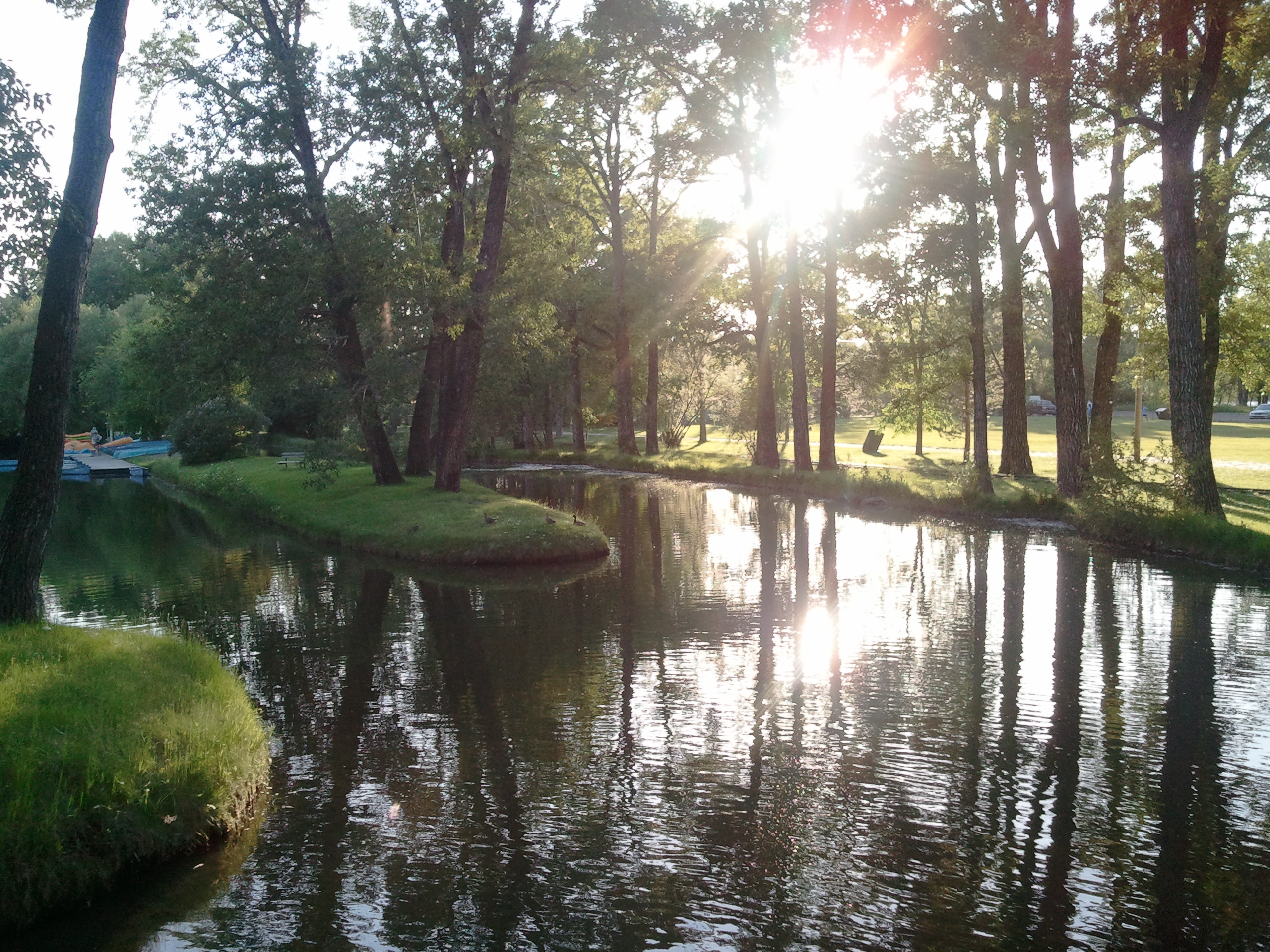
- Lagoon in Bowness Park
- Interactive map of Bowness Park
- Type: urban park
- Location: Bowness
- Nearest city: Calgary, Alberta
- Coordinates: 51°05′49″N 114°13′01″W
- Area: 30 hectares (74 acres)
- Created: 1911
- Operator: City of Calgary

Bowness Park is a 30-hectare (74-acre) urban park on the Bow River in Bowness, a neighbourhood in the northwest quadrant of the City of Calgary, Alberta, Canada. It is popular in the summer for picnics and boating, and in winter for ice skating on the lagoon and the canal which feeds it.

The park was closed to the public for safety reasons after the major flood which hit Calgary in June 2013. The west half of the park reopened in November 2014, and the east half of the park reopened in 2016. Among other attractions, a ridable miniature railway operates seasonally in the park.

== History ==
Land for the park was donated to the City of Calgary in 1911 by John Hextall, as part of a deal to secure the extension of streetcar service into Bowness Estates, which he was developing as an exclusive suburb. The land consisted of two islands in the Bow River, separated from the south bank by a narrow channel, now dammed off to create a lagoon and small canal.

Although hardly any development took place in Bowness before the end of the second world war, Bowness Park itself was extremely popular, due to the streetcar service which took Calgarians right to the door when automobiles were rare. In the 1920s and 30s service on summer weekends was every 15 minutes and it was estimated that on a fine weekend up to 25,000 people would visit the park, with 28 streetcars being assigned to handle the traffic. Streetcar service was maintained from 1913 through 1950.

Facilities in the park in the early days were extensive. There was a swimming pool, the lagoon for canoeing and boating (with a fountain and central phonograph “playing gentle music”), a large dancing pavilion, a merry-go-round (now in Calgary's Heritage Park), picnic tables and shelters, swings and teeter-totters, camping sites and cabins which could be rented by the week or month and later a scenic railway. The following extract from a 1919 newspaper article gives some idea of the atmosphere at the time:

“The new ferry, which will cross the original boating lake just west of the swimming pool, will supply a want which was badly felt last season. It is expected … that the boys and girls will have a great time on this ferry. It will enable the young people as well as the older ones to shoot across the lake from the grand stand to the refreshment cottage and merry-go-round, without having to tramp around by the lovers' walk or the path at the foot of the lake.”

The summer cottages at the park were often rented by families as a summer retreat, beginning in the early 1920s until they were removed in 1946.

Many of the former attractions are gone today: the swimming pool was closed in 1959, dancing ceased in 1960, and the Orthophonic, as the phonograph was called, stopped beaming out its music in 1961.

=== Bowness Park today ===
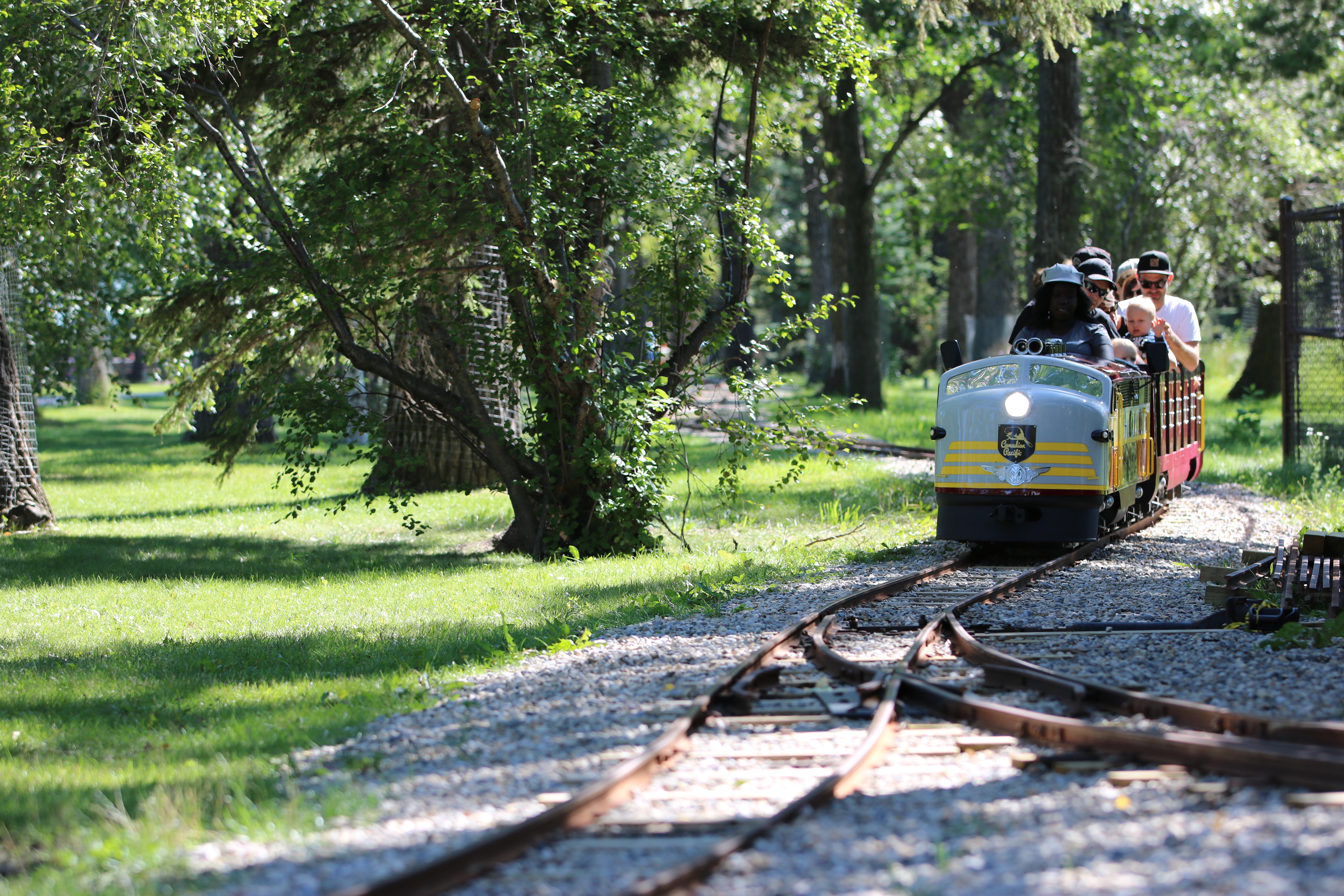
The ridable miniature railway operates in summer months.

Boats are still available for rent on the lagoon, the fountain has been reinstalled, and the lagoon is used extensively for skating in the winter. In summer, the picnic sites and open spaces for ball games are popular, as is a mini-golf. The modest redevelopment proposed in a 2008 plan began in June 2012. However, the redevelopment was dealt a major setback with the June 2013 flood. Parts of the park were covered by as much as 1.5 meters of silt, as well as other debris. As a result, the redevelopment work that had been done so far was largely erased, and the work plan was modified in order to keep the reduce the impact of future floods. The park was closed for summer 2014. The west half reopened in November 2014, and the east half of the park is expected to reopen in summer 2016.

A playground is built in the east side of the park, and the Bow River pathway crosses the park's length. The park is used for launching boats on the Bow River.

A ridable miniature railway operates seasonally in the park. The line opened in the early 1950s, but shut down in 2013 as a result of heavy damage from flooding. The track was subsequently repaired, and a new train set was acquired, and operation restarted in July 2016.
