= Baker Park (Calgary) =

Park in Calgary, Alberta, Canada

- Interactive map of Baker Park
- Type: Urban park
- Location: Calgary, Alberta
- Coordinates: 51°6′2.5″N 114°13′11.3″W
- Area: 12 hectares (30 acres)
- Operator: City of Calgary

Baker Park is a 12-hectare (30-acre) urban park on the bank of the Bow River in the west edge of the city of Calgary. It is part of the pedestrian and bicycle Bow River pathway that links a vast network of urban parks on both sides of the river. Baker Park is situated across the river from Bowness Park east of the Bearspaw Water Intake Pump Station. With its river observation point overlooking the Bow River and Bowness Park and its archways and arbours, it is the "most popular" park in Calgary for outdoor weddings.

== History ==
Baker Park is named after Dr. Albert Henry Baker (1883–1953), the director of a tuberculosis (TB) sanitorium located on the same site from 1920 to 1979 and demolished in 1989 by Alberta Public Works. The federal government's Soldiers' Civil Re-establishment Department constructed the first buildings in 1918. Established in 1919 for returning World War I veterans who suffered from TB, the Central Alberta Sanatorium as it was then called, was typical of its era, "isolated, treed and divided into many separate buildings." It was "downstream from the old Alberta Ice Company warehouse" (now the Shriner's storage area for antiques). In 1916 Dr. A. H. Baker served on a medical advisory committee investigating the prevalence of TB among Canadian indigenous populations and in 1917, as a member of the Royal Canadian Army Medical Corps, he served in China. In 1918, following a diagnosis of TB he was discharged—though he never required hospitalization. He came to Alberta where he served as Medical Superintendent of the Central Alberta Sanatorium from 1920 to 1950 and as the Alberta Department of Health's director of the tuberculosis division. When Baker retired in 1950 after thirty years of service, the sanitorium was renamed the Baker Memorial Sanatorium in his honour. The site was nearest what would become the village of Bowness and eventually many Bowness villagers worked at the Sanitorium. By 1962—as more accommodations for TB patients were created elsewhere—the Sanitorium was gradually converted to the Baker Center for the Services of the Handicapped.

One of the legacies of the Baker Centre that is part of Baker Park, is the stand of 1,800 mature trees planted by gardeners from the former sanitorium.

== Features ==
Unlike most Calgary parks Baker Park's "old-fashioned formality" with its "geometrical walkways" and "arrow-straight" tree-lined avenues, reflects its history as a World War I sanitorium.

Along with the riparian native plants and shrubs, Alberta author Terry Bullick noted that the list of family trees include White Spruce, Green Ash, Colorado Spruce, Manitoba Maple, Lodgepole Pine, Bur Oak, Scots Pine, Aspen, Douglas Fir, Larch, Poplar, May Day Tree, Paper Birch, Mountain Ash, Weeping Birch, Hawthorn, Manchurian Elm, and Flowering Crabtree.

Aside from the usual picnic areas and pathways, Baker Park also has a disc-golf course. Its promenades, archways, arbour, grass amphitheater, and river observation point make it a prized area for wedding photos. The Baker Park section of the Bow River Pathway runs through rows of trees past the former sanitorium site to a large river observation point. It also features a wildflower mount and a sun bowl in the middle of the park.

The park is maintained by the city of Calgary Recreation Department.
