= Silver Springs, Calgary =

Silver Springs
- Neighbourhood
- Location of Silver Springs in Calgary
- Coordinates: 51°06′22″N 114°11′19″W
- Country: Canada
- Province: Alberta
- City: Calgary
- Quadrant: NW
- Ward: 1
- Established: 1972

Government
  - Mayor: Jeromy Farkas
  - Administrative body: Calgary City Council
  - Councillor: Kim Tyers (Communities First)

Area
  - Total: 3.4 km^{2} (1.3 sq mi)
- Elevation: 1,130 m (3,710 ft)

Population (2006)
  - Total: 9,329
  - Average Income: $73,776

Silver Springs is a residential neighbourhood in the northwest quadrant of Calgary, Alberta. It is bounded to the north by Crowchild Trail, to the east by Sarcee Trail, to the south by the Bow River and to the west by Nose Hill Drive. The Silver Springs golf course is developed in the eastern part of the community, and the Bowmont Natural Area borders the community to the south.

Silver Springs was developed between 1972 and 1980. It is represented in the Calgary City Council by the Ward 1 councillor.

== Demographics ==
In the City of Calgary's 2012 municipal census, Silver Springs had a population of 8,933 living in 3,533 dwellings, a 0.3% increase from its 2011 population of 8,910. With a land area of 5 km^{2} (1.9 sq mi), it had a population density of 1,790/km^{2} (4,600/sq mi) in 2012.

Residents in this community had a median household income of $73,776 in 2000, and there were 5.8% low income residents living in the neighbourhood. As of 2000, 16.7% of the residents were immigrants. A proportion of 9.1% of the buildings were condominiums or apartments, and 15.9% of the housing was used for renting.

== Education ==
The community is served by Silver Springs Elementary and W.O. Mitchell Elementary public schools, as well as by St. Sylvester Elementary School (Catholic). It is also served by St Vincent de Paul Catholic school in Varsity.

== The Ravine ==
The section of the "Bowmont Natural Area" which forms the Southern border of the community is commonly known to Silver Springs residents as "The Ravine" or "The Gully" and is a popular recreational area.

== Businesses and Organizations ==
Silver Springs supports two commercial centres, one at the western end of the primary thoroughfare, Silver Springs Boulevard, and the other just north of the gully.

A Calgary Police Station once formed part of the plaza. A police officer lost his life in a training accident at the station in the early 2000s.

== See also ==
- List of neighbourhoods in Calgary
