= Ziarat Juniper Forest =

Forest in Ziarat, Pakistan

- IUCN category IV (habitat/species management area)
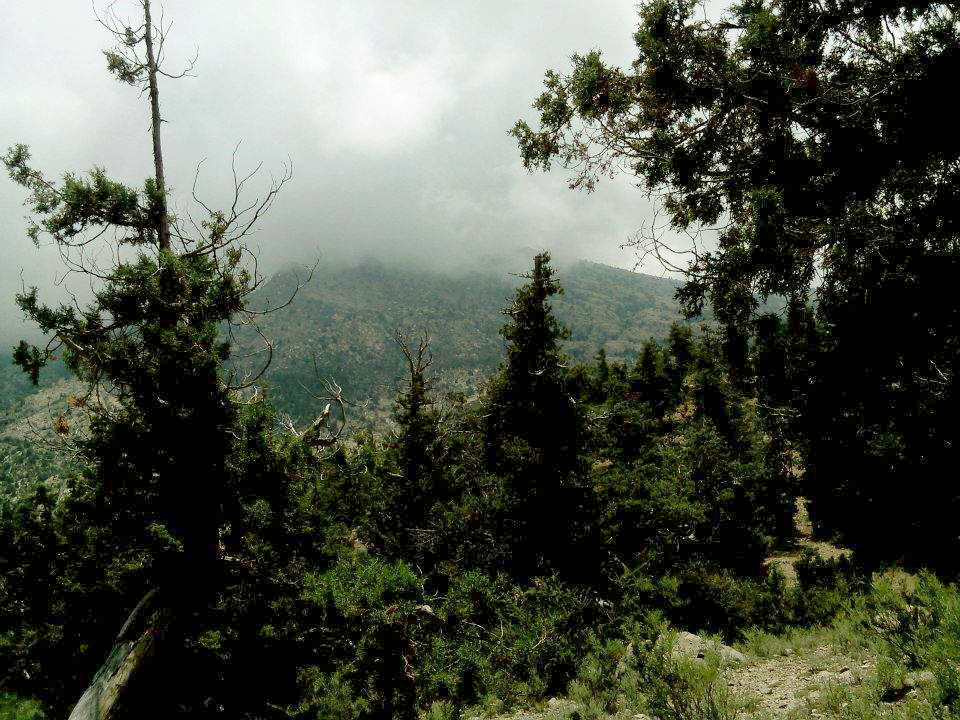
- Juniperus seravschanica in Ziarat Juniper Forest
- Interactive map of Ziarat Juniper Forest
- Coordinates: 30°21′46.27″N 68°09′29.78″E
- Area: 111,852 ha (431.86 sq mi)
- Designation: Biosphere Reserve
- Designated: 2013
- Administrator: Balochistan Forest and Wildlife Department
- World Heritage site: tentative list (2016)

The Ziarat Juniper Forest is a juniper forest in Ziarat, Balochistan, Pakistan.

== Geography ==
These forests are spread around mountainous area of Ziarat and Mount Zarghoon. The mountains range from 1,181 to 3,488 meters elevation. The forests cover an area of about 110,000 hectares, and it is the largest juniper forest in Pakistan. The aree spans between 30°21’46.27”N – 30°25’57.70”N, and 67°18’30.51”E – 68°09’29.78”E.

The climate is temperate and semi-arid, with mild summers and cold winters. Average annual rainfall (measured in Ziarat) is 269 mm, with a maximum of 74 mm in July and a minimum of 3 mm in January. July is the hottest month (27.4 °C), and January the coldest (7.9 °C). Relative humidity ranges from 35% in January to 60% in September. Snow falls between November and April, with a maximum (68 cm) in February.

== Ecology ==
The characteristic tree is the Pashtun juniper (Juniperus seravschanica). Juniper forest occurs between 2000 and 3,000 meters elevation along ridge tops and on moderate to steep slopes (18º to 30º). They grow mostly in dense, open, and pure stands without stratification. The age of the oldest trees is 5000 to 7000 years, for which they are called living fossils. 54 different species of plants are found in the forests, including Afghan ash (Fraxinus xanthoxyloides), wild pistachio (Pistacia atlantica and P. khinjuk), wild almond (Prunus eburnea), makhi (Caragana ambigua), surai (Rosa beggeriana), and zralg (Berberis baluchistanica, B. calliobotrys, B. densiflora, and B. lycium). About half of native plant species are used medicinally by local people. Essential oils from the juniper have antioxidant qualities and have been used medicinally since antiquity. These forests also prevent evaporation of water reserves that are a major source of livelihood for local people.

Native mammals include the Sulaiman markhor (Capra falconeri jerdoni), urial (Ovis vignei), Asian black bear (Ursus thibetanus), wolf (Canis lupus), golden jackal (Canis aureus), and Afghan pika (Ochotona rufescens). Birds include the chukar (Alectoris chukar), mistle thrush (Turdus viscivorus), Black-throated thrush (Turdus atrogularis), streaked laughingthrush (Trochalopteron lineatum), rufous-naped tit (Periparus rufonuchalis), and bar-tailed treecreeper (Certhia himalayana).

== Conservation and threats ==
The juniper forests grow in a semi-arid climate, and are slow-growing and long-lived. For centuries local people have harvested firewood, timber, and various medicinal and aromatic plants from the forests. Since the mid-20th century the forest cover and forest area have declined, and the forests have shown little regeneration. Factors in their decline include increasing human population, overgrazing by livestock, illegal timber cutting, overharvesting of firewood and juniper seeds, periodic droughts, attack on weakened trees by parasitic fungi and the mistletoe Arceuthobium oxycedri, and climate change. These activities were once mostly limited to lower elevations, but in recent decades have spread to higher elevations. Human activity has also altered the species composition of the forests, and once-common companion broadleaf trees like Fraxinus xanthoxyloides and Pistacia khinjuk are now rare, found only in small numbers along watercourses.

On October 29, 2008 a 6.4 magnitude earthquake hit Ziarat and surrounding areas. After the earthquake disruptions the local villagers are now using Juniper trees as fire wood.

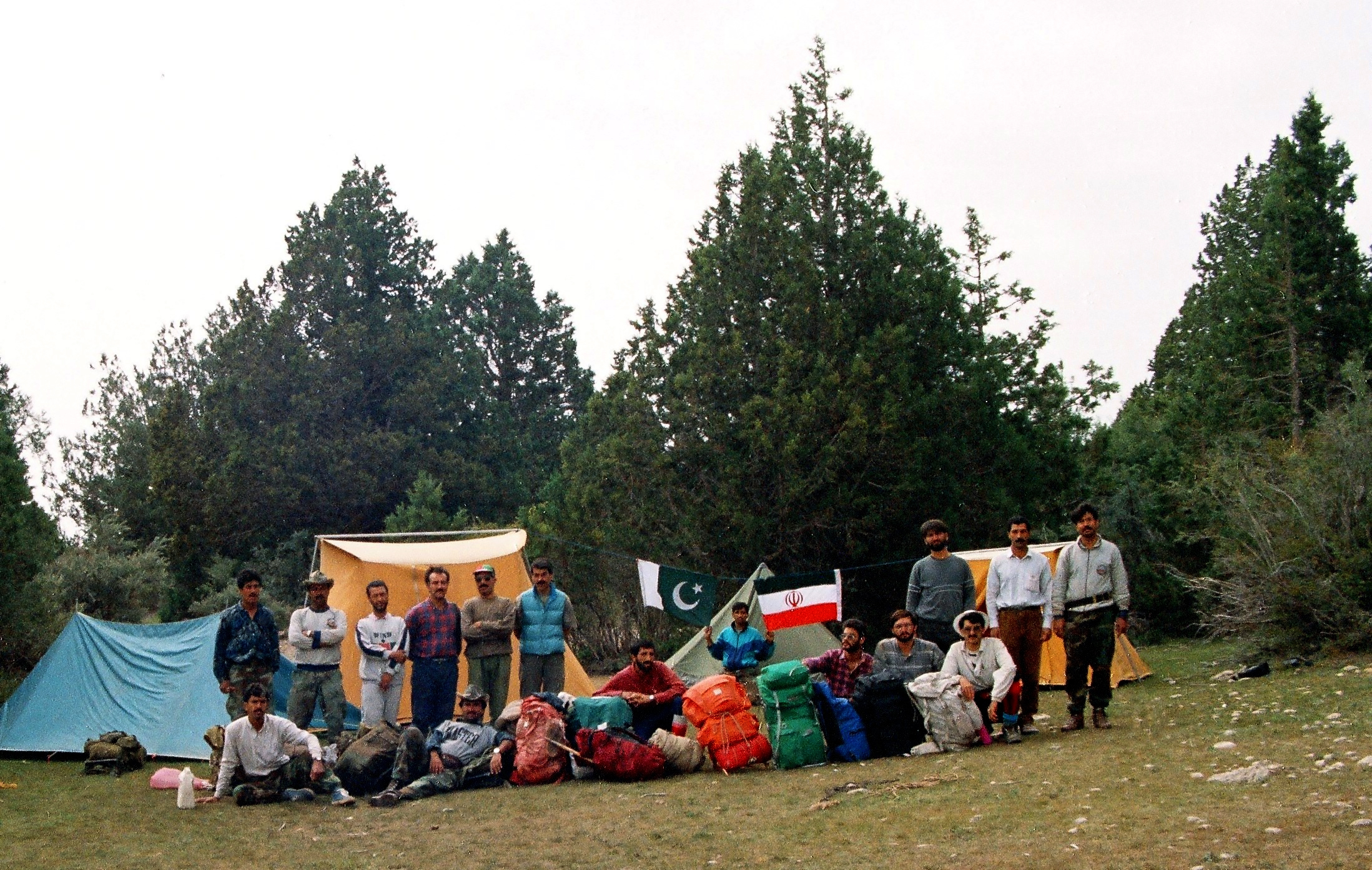
Pak-Iran Juniper Defenders and Mountaineers headed by Hayatullah Khan Durrani at base camp of Zarghoon Mount Balochistan 1991,

On 25 October 2010 The Government of Balochistan Sports, Environment and Youth Affairs Departments announced the Silver Jubilee “Juniper Defender Award” to Hayatullah Khan Durrani, for his long outstanding efforts as juniper defender since 1984. Hayat Durrani is an environmental analyst for the preservation of the 3000-year-old World Heritage of juniper forests and wildlife in the Ziarat and Zarghoon Ghar regions of Balochistan Pakistan.

== Protected area ==
In 1971, a 372.47 km^{2} portion of the forest was designated a wildlife sanctuary.

In 2013 the forest was declared a biosphere reserve, with a core area of 11,243 hectares, a 60,519 hectare buffer zone, a 40,090 hectare transition area, and a total area of 111,852 hectares. In 2016 the Government of Pakistan nominated the Ziarat Juniper Forest as a World Heritage Site.
