= Coleophora caraganae =

Scientific classification
- Kingdom: Animalia
- Phylum: Arthropoda
- Class: Insecta
- Order: Lepidoptera
- Family: Coleophoridae
- Genus: Coleophora
- Species: C. caraganae

Binomial name
- Coleophora caraganae Falkovitsh, 1974

Species of moth

Coleophora caraganae is a moth of the family Coleophoridae. It is found in Russia (Ussuri).

The larvae feed on Caragana ussuriensis and Halimodendron halodendron. They feed on the leaves of their host plant.
