= Coleophora halimodendri =

Scientific classification
- Kingdom: Animalia
- Phylum: Arthropoda
- Class: Insecta
- Order: Lepidoptera
- Family: Coleophoridae
- Genus: Coleophora
- Species: C. halimodendri

Binomial name
- Coleophora halimodendri Reznik, 1989

Species of moth

Coleophora halimodendri is a moth of the family Coleophoridae. It is found in Kazakhstan.

The larvae feed on Halimodendron halodendron. They feed on the leaves and flower buds of their host plant.
