= Coleophora uxorella =

Scientific classification
- Kingdom: Animalia
- Phylum: Arthropoda
- Class: Insecta
- Order: Lepidoptera
- Family: Coleophoridae
- Genus: Coleophora
- Species: C. uxorella

Binomial name
- Coleophora uxorella (Falkovitsh, 1993)

Synonyms
- Apista uxorella Falkovitsh, 1993

Species of moth

Coleophora uxorella is a moth of the family Coleophoridae.

The larvae feed on the generative organs of Caragana species.
