= Caragana korshinskii =

Scientific classification
- Kingdom: Plantae
- Clade: Tracheophytes
- Clade: Angiosperms
- Clade: Eudicots
- Clade: Rosids
- Order: Fabales
- Family: Fabaceae
- Subfamily: Faboideae
- Genus: Caragana
- Species: C. korshinskii

Binomial name
- Caragana korshinskii Kom.

Species of flowering plant

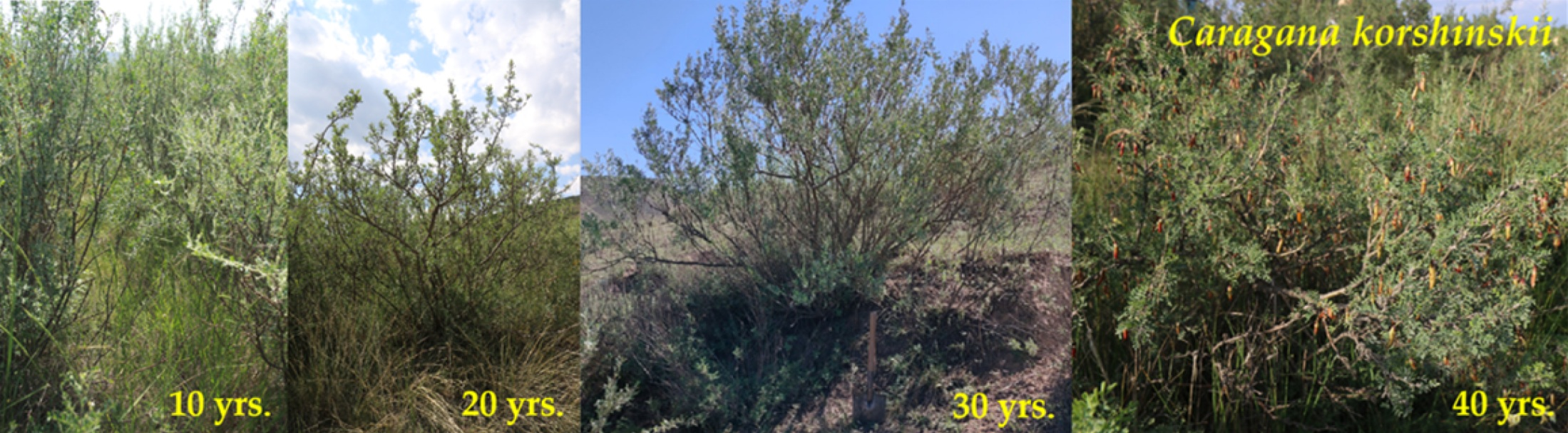
C. korshinskii shrubs at different growth stages after planting

Caragana korshinskii, also known as the Korshinsk pea shrub, is a shrub from the genus Caragana. The plant is native to sandy grass and desert areas of northern China and Mongolia. This plant is a minor host of Scolytus schevyrewi (banded elm bark beetle). Caragana korshinskii is utilized in Northern China for both the fixation of sand and soil/water conservation. This plant is found in desert regions of China and is adapted to suit that environment. This adaption is seen in its ability to survive under conditions prone to salty, cold, and dry conditions.

It is commonly planted to reduce soil erosion as well as for animal feed.

== Plant structure ==
Caragana korshinskii is a dicot plant with simple leaves made up of pinnate venation and are oppositely arranged. The pea shrub is composed of multiple stems that range between 1–4 m in length.

== Human uses ==
Caragana korshinskii is utilized by people to curb erosion. It also helps to facilitate revegetation of ecosystems in China, as well as providing shade for the animals that inhabit the area. People have also been using it to improve the soil by supplying nutrients that can be taken up by other plants in the future.

Caragana korshinskii can also be used to build poles, tool handles, and other forms of woodware.

== Phytochemicals ==
Caragana korshinskii contains the indole based alkaloid Hypaphorine
