= Prunus erioclada =

Scientific classification
- Kingdom: Plantae
- Clade: Tracheophytes
- Clade: Angiosperms
- Clade: Eudicots
- Clade: Rosids
- Order: Rosales
- Family: Rosaceae
- Genus: Prunus
- Species: P. erioclada

Binomial name
- Prunus erioclada (Bornm.) Yazbek

Synonyms
- Amygdalus erioclada Bornm.

Species of wild almond from Iran and Afghanistan

Prunus erioclada is a species of wild almond native to Iran and Afghanistan. It is a thorny shrub 0.2 to 1.2 m tall. It is morphologically similar to Prunus lycioides, P. spinosissima, P. eburnea and P. brahuica. It can be distinguished from the similar species by having its one year old twigs densely covered by a white pubescence, termed white tomentose, and the older twigs grayish-white tomentose. A genetic and morphological analysis shows that it is a good species, with its closest relative being Prunus eburnea.
