= Prunus brahuica =

Scientific classification
- Kingdom: Plantae
- Clade: Tracheophytes
- Clade: Angiosperms
- Clade: Eudicots
- Clade: Rosids
- Order: Rosales
- Family: Rosaceae
- Genus: Prunus
- Species: P. brahuica

Binomial name
- Prunus brahuica (Boiss.) Aitch. & Hemsl.

Synonyms
- Amygdalus brahuica Boiss.; Amygdalus afghanica Pachom.

Species of wild almond from Pakistan and Afghanistan

Prunus brahuica is a species of flowering plant in the Rosaceae family. It is commonly called mashmonk or mazhmonk and ghorghosthai, is a species of wild almond native to Pakistan and Afghanistan. It is a dense, very thorny shrub 1.5 to 2.5 m tall, with young twigs that are brownish-red on one side and green on the other. It is morphologically similar to Prunus lycioides, P. spinosissima, P. eburnea and P. erioclada. It can be distinguished from the similar species by having an endocarp with reticulate furrows that are visible on the exterior of the drupe. People in Balochistan apply its gum as a treatment for wounded or infected eyes.
