= Caragana jubata =

Scientific classification
- Kingdom: Plantae
- Clade: Tracheophytes
- Clade: Angiosperms
- Clade: Eudicots
- Clade: Rosids
- Order: Fabales
- Family: Fabaceae
- Subfamily: Faboideae
- Genus: Caragana
- Species: C. jubata

Binomial name
- Caragana jubata (Pall.) Poir.

Species of flowering plant

Caragana jubata is a flowering plant native to the Gobi Desert of Mongolia. It is a legume of the family or subfamily Papillionaceae. It is notable for being extremely spiny and extremely hairy. The range of the plants extends from Myanmar to Siberia in the north and from China in the east and as far west as Tajikistan.
