= Caragana bicolor =

Scientific classification
- Kingdom: Plantae
- Clade: Tracheophytes
- Clade: Angiosperms
- Clade: Eudicots
- Clade: Rosids
- Order: Fabales
- Family: Fabaceae
- Subfamily: Faboideae
- Genus: Caragana
- Species: C. bicolor

Binomial name
- Caragana bicolor Kom.

Synonyms
- Gnaphalium bicolor Franch.

Species of legume

Caragana bicolor is a species of flowering plants within the family Fabaceae. It is an endemic species in found in China.
