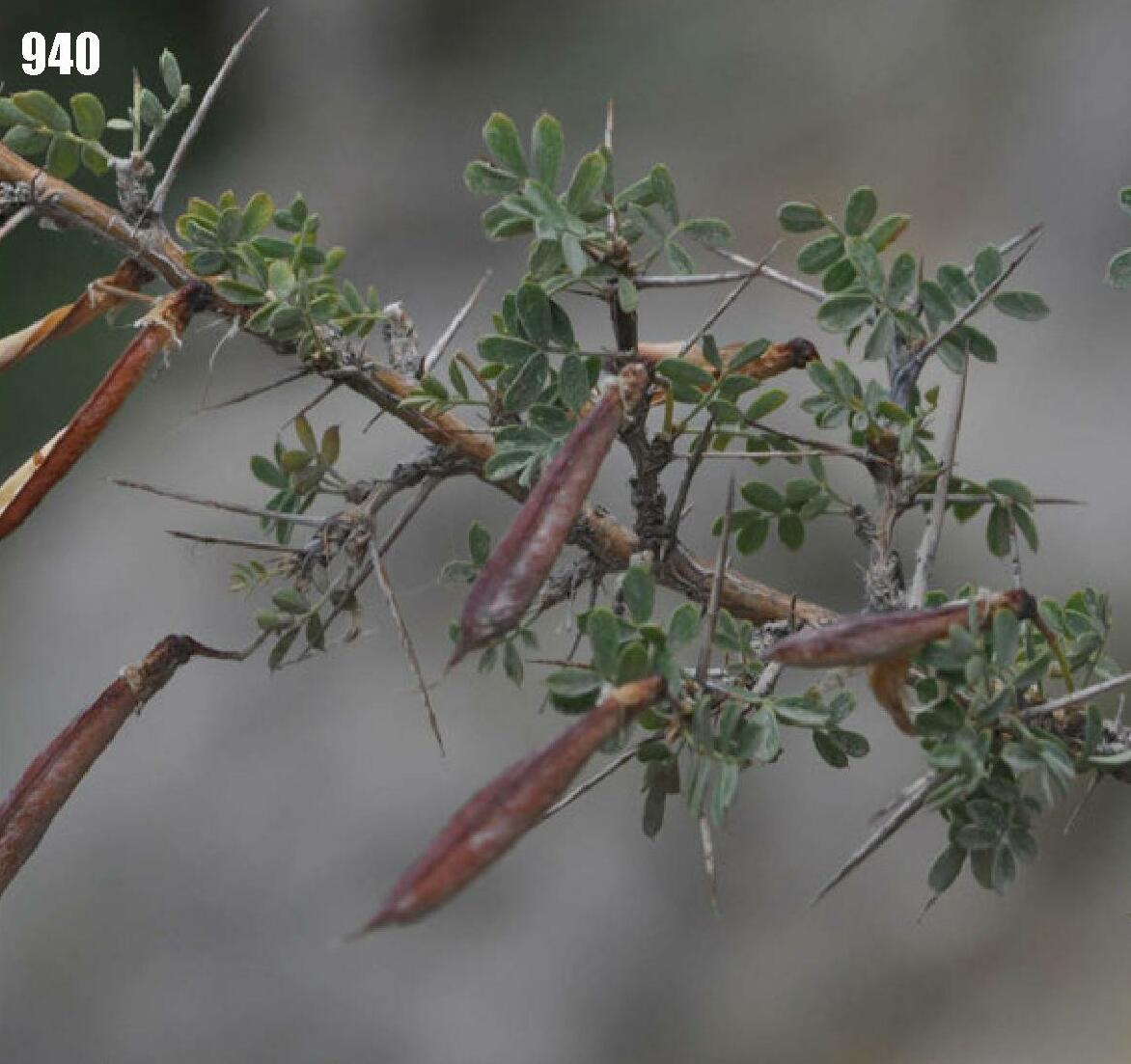

Scientific classification
- Kingdom: Plantae
- Clade: Tracheophytes
- Clade: Angiosperms
- Clade: Eudicots
- Clade: Rosids
- Order: Fabales
- Family: Fabaceae
- Subfamily: Faboideae
- Genus: Caragana
- Species: C. acanthophylla

Binomial name
- Caragana acanthophylla Kom.

Synonyms
- Caragana ancanthophylla Kom.

= Caragana acanthophylla =

Species of legume

Caragana acanthophylla is a species of flowering plants within the family Fabaceae. It is found in a number of countries across Asia including China, India, Kazakhstan, Kyrgyzstan, Nepal, Pakistan and Tajikistan.
