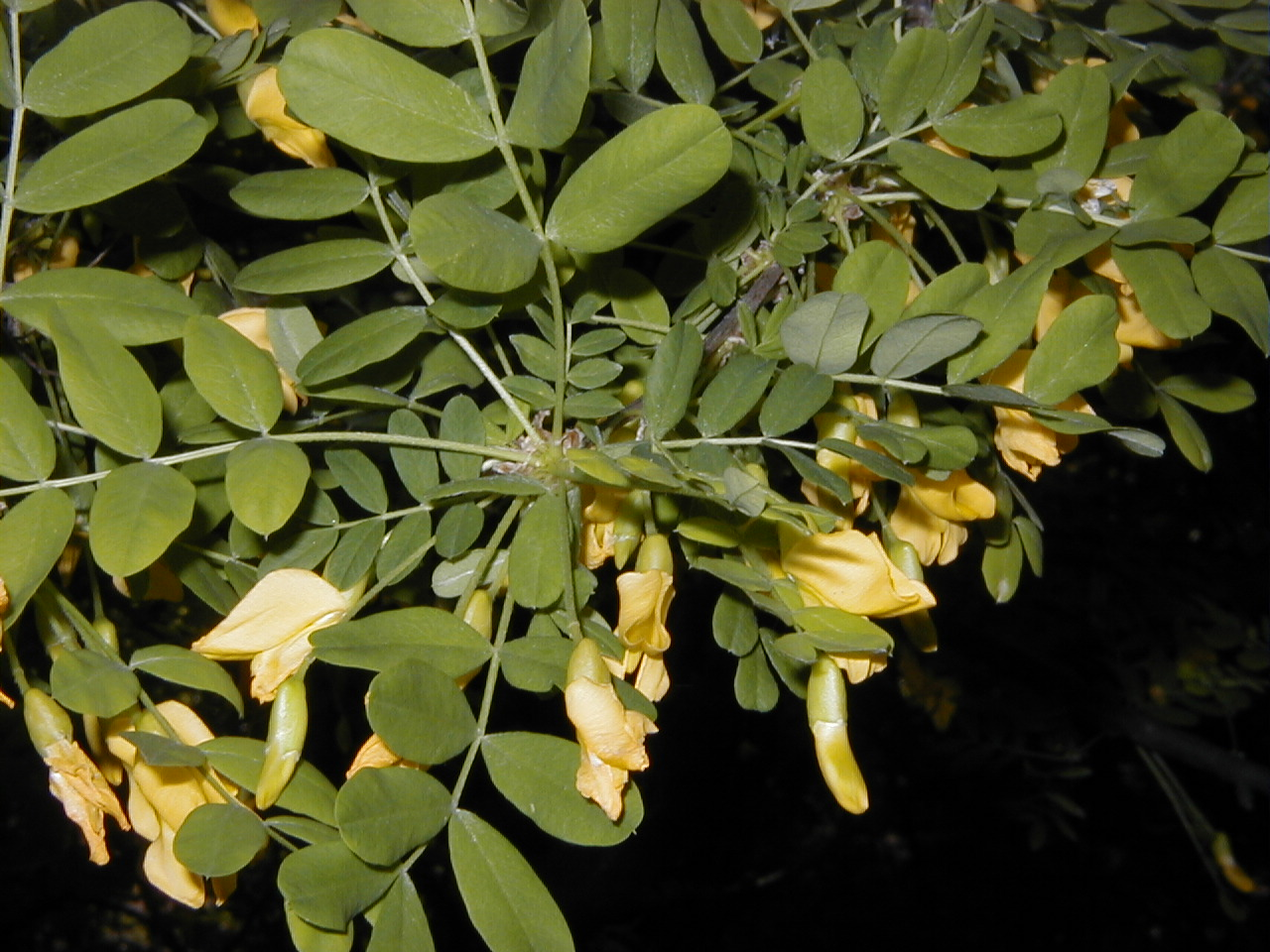
- Shelter break of Caragana arborescens

Conservation status
- Least Concern (IUCN 3.1)

Scientific classification
- Kingdom: Plantae
- Clade: Tracheophytes
- Clade: Angiosperms
- Clade: Eudicots
- Clade: Rosids
- Order: Fabales
- Family: Fabaceae
- Subfamily: Faboideae
- Genus: Caragana
- Species: C. arborescens

Binomial name
- Caragana arborescens Lam.

= Caragana arborescens =

Species of flowering plant

Caragana arborescens, the Siberian peashrub, Siberian pea-tree, or caragana, is a species of legume native to Siberia and parts of China (Heilongjiang, Xinjiang) and neighboring Mongolia and Kazakhstan. It was taken to the United States by Eurasian immigrants, who used it as a food source while travelling west. In some areas of the United States it is considered an invasive species. Introduced on the Canadian prairies in the 1880s, the hardy caragana provided shelter-belts, wildlife habitat, nitrogen fixation, and windbreaks to prevent soil erosion and snow drifting.

== Description ==
It is a perennial shrub or small tree growing 2–6 m (6 ft 7 in – 19 ft 8 in) tall. Typically, it has a moderate to fast growth rate, being able to grow one to three feet during the first year after trimming.

In ornamental horticulture, Caragana arborescens can also be cultivated as a grafted standard, with a raised trunk and a compact or pendulous crown. The eventual appearance of these plants depends on the selected cultivar, the height of the graft and subsequent pruning. In pendulous forms, regular crown maintenance can help preserve the desired shape, while shoots emerging from the rootstock below the graft should be removed.

The leaves vary from light green to dark green, and are alternate and compound with many small leaflets. Fragrant yellow flowers bloom in May or June. The fruits are legumes which contain many seeds, and ripen in July. As the seed pods dry they have a tendency to twist and pop open, releasing the seeds.

The plant tolerates a wide range of climatic environments in the United States such as Alaska, California, and New Mexico. It can live up to 140 years.

== Uses ==
Caragana arborescens can be grown as an ornamental plant and has been extensively used in windbreaks. It has an extensive root system, and can be used in erosion control.

The production of seeds is very large, but they are small in size and bland in flavor. The seeds are edible by humans and chickens, but should be cooked before being consumed by people.

It can be used to neutralize soil to prepare for further planting and as a legume, C. arborescens fixes nitrogen. It is suitable for planting in single-row field windbreaks where a dense, short barrier is desired; and it is recommended for planting in the outer rows of multi-row plantings.

C. arborescens is used for nesting by several songbirds but its seeds are rarely eaten by them. The plant is not a preferred food for browsing animals, but its fragrant flowers attract many pollen-consuming animals.
