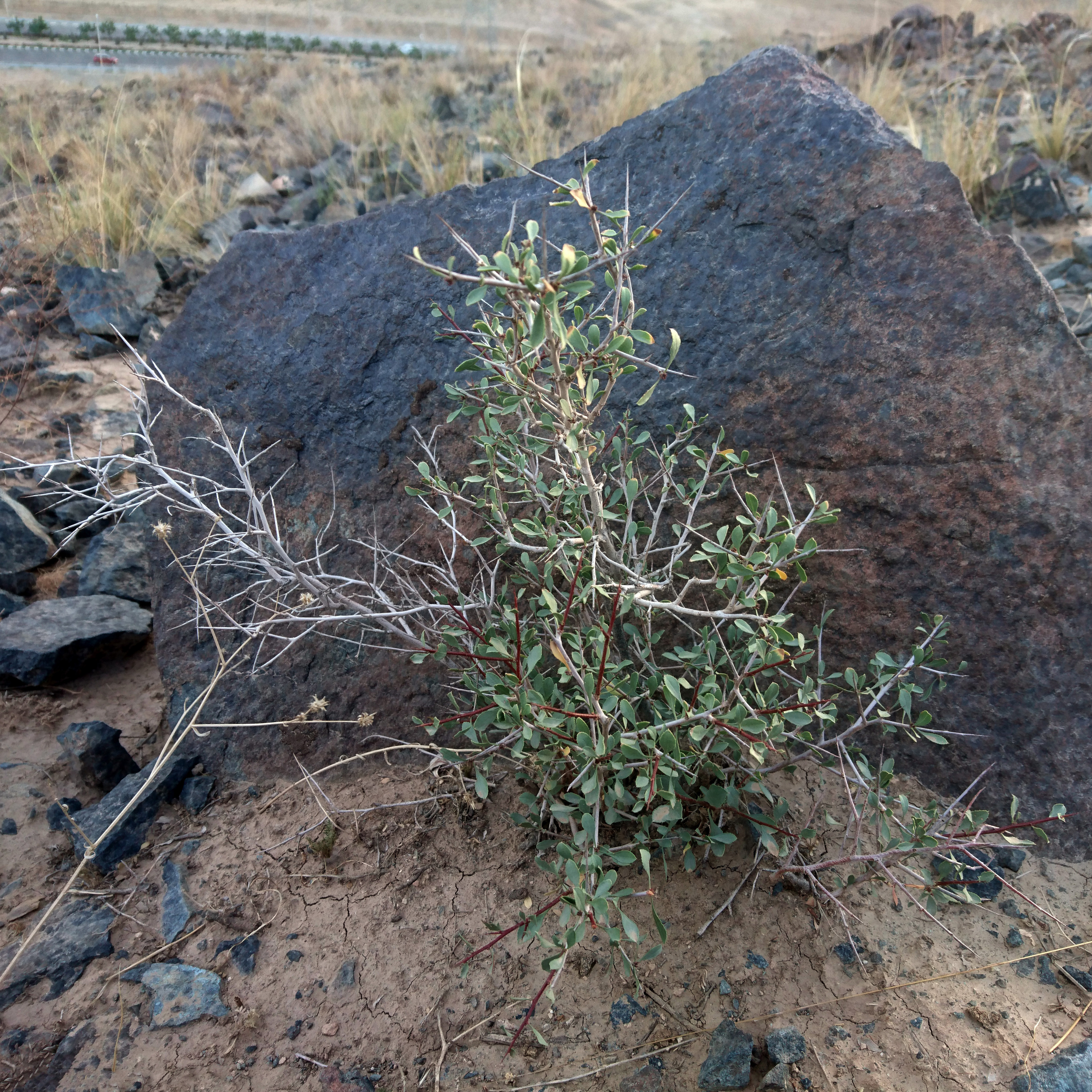

Scientific classification
- Kingdom: Plantae
- Clade: Tracheophytes
- Clade: Angiosperms
- Clade: Eudicots
- Clade: Rosids
- Order: Rosales
- Family: Rosaceae
- Genus: Prunus
- Subgenus: Prunus subg. Amygdalus
- Species: P. lycioides

Binomial name
- Prunus lycioides (Spach) C.K.Schneid.

Synonyms
- Amygdalus lycioides Spach; Amygdalopsis lycioides (Spach) M.J. Roem.; Amygdalus horrida Spach; Amygdalopsis horrida (Spach) M. J. Roem.; Amygdalus lycioides var. horrida (Spach) Browicz; Amygdalus horrida Spach var. reuteri Boiss.; Amygdalus reuteri Boiss. & Buhse

= Prunus lycioides =

Species of wild almond from Turkey, Iran and Syria

Prunus lycioides (Persian: تنگرس, lit. 'biting thorn'), sometimes known as Persian gum, is a species of wild almond native to Turkey, northern Syria and Iran. It is a very thorny and dense shrub 0.6 to 1.2 m tall. Its bark is gray and its flower petals are pink to deep pink, with its sepals and hypanthia deep red to purple. It is morphologically similar to Prunus erioclada, P. spinosissima, P. eburnea and P. brahuica. It can be distinguished from the similar species by its longer, narrower leaves, which are linear, linear‑lanceolate, or linear‑oblanceolate, and by subtle characters of its endocarp. Adapted to extremely dry conditions, it is found growing in a wide variety of arid and semiarid habitats, at 450 to 2200 m above sea level.

== Gallery ==
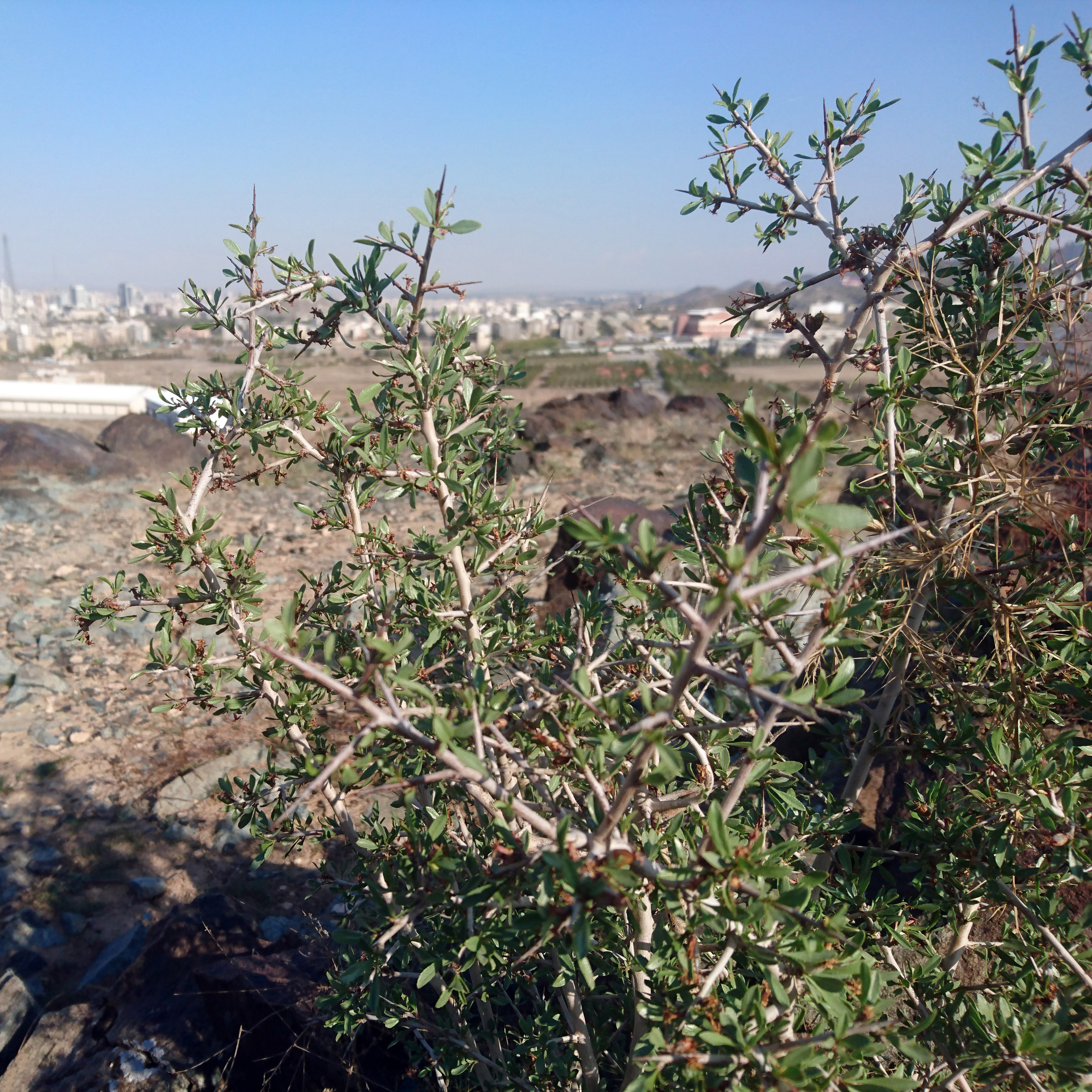

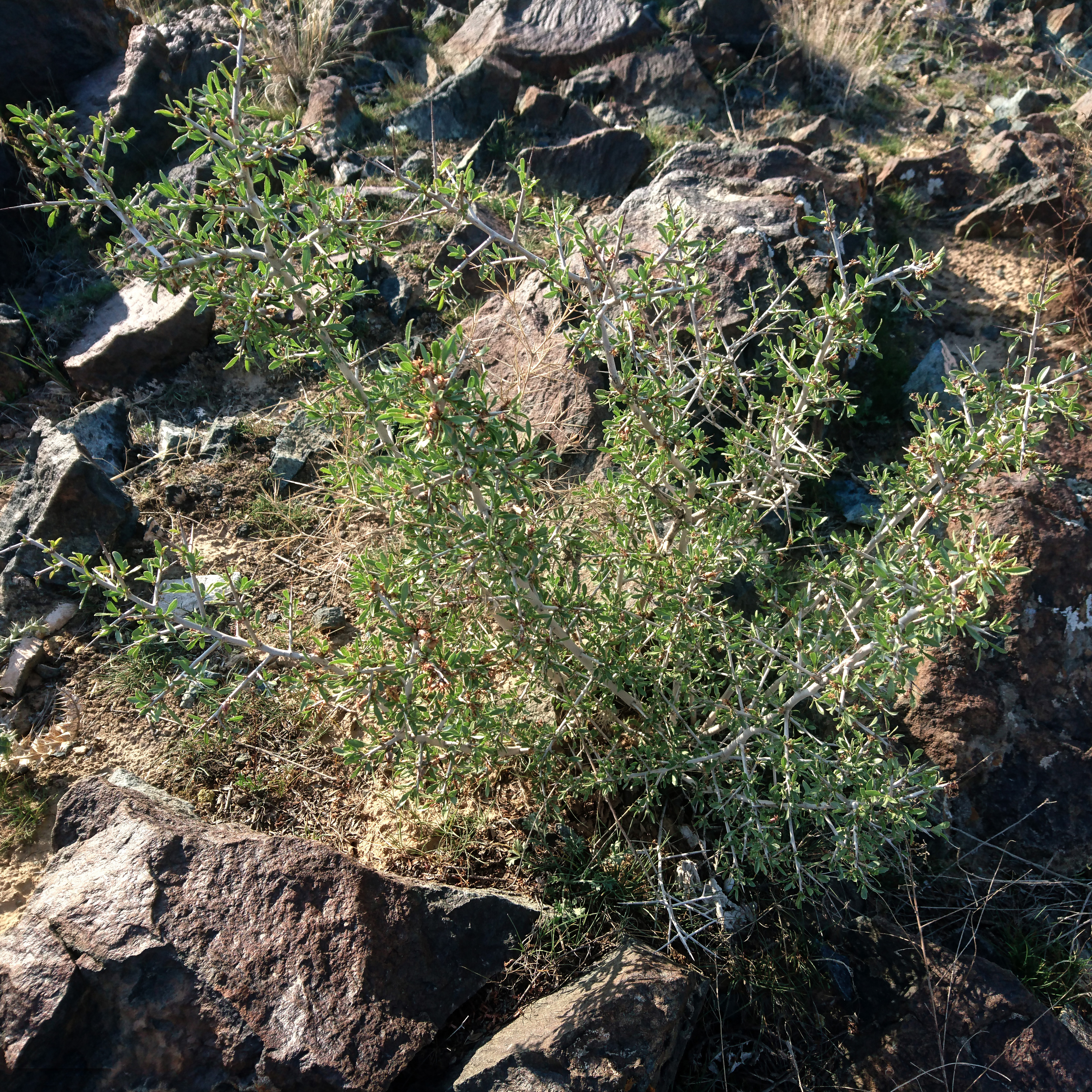

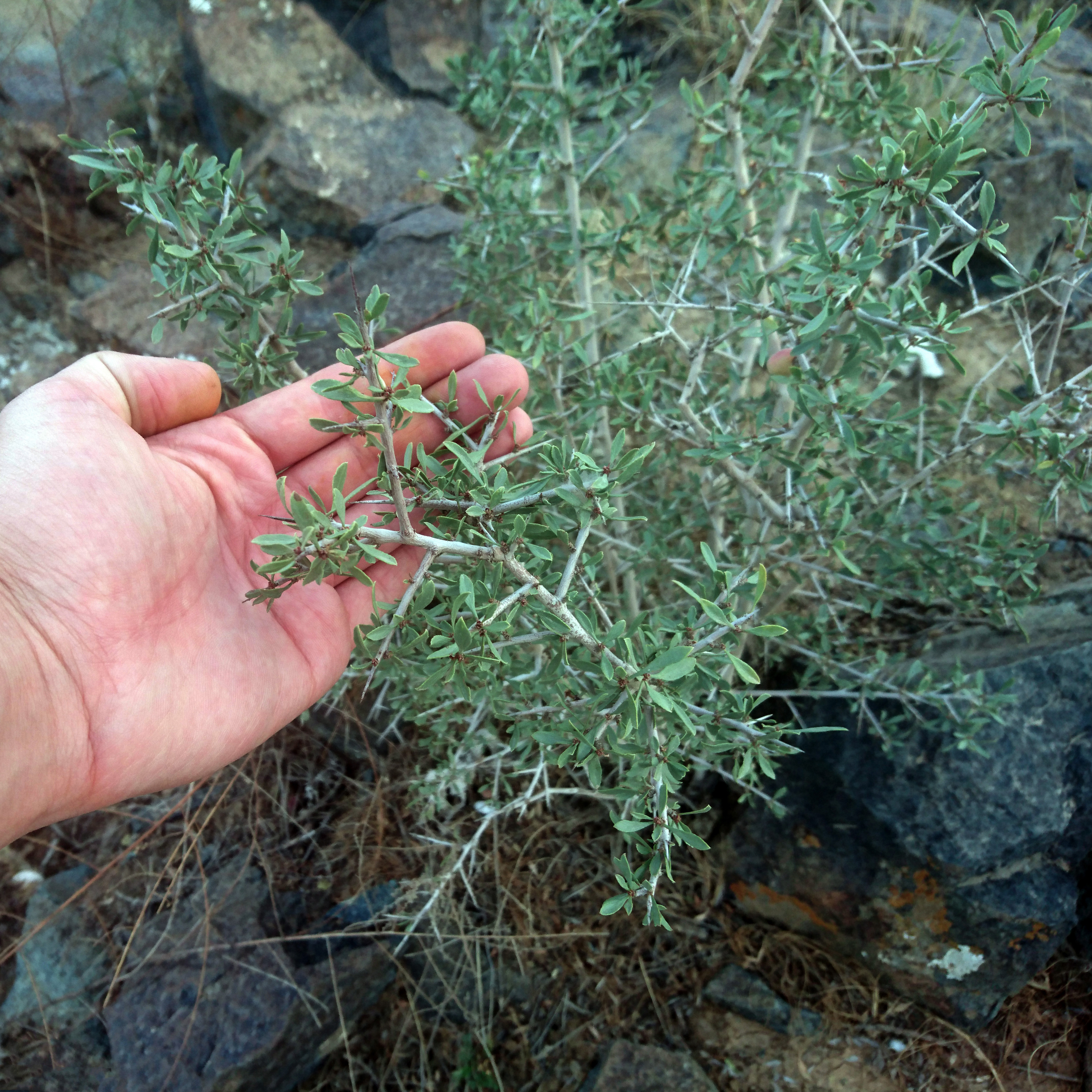

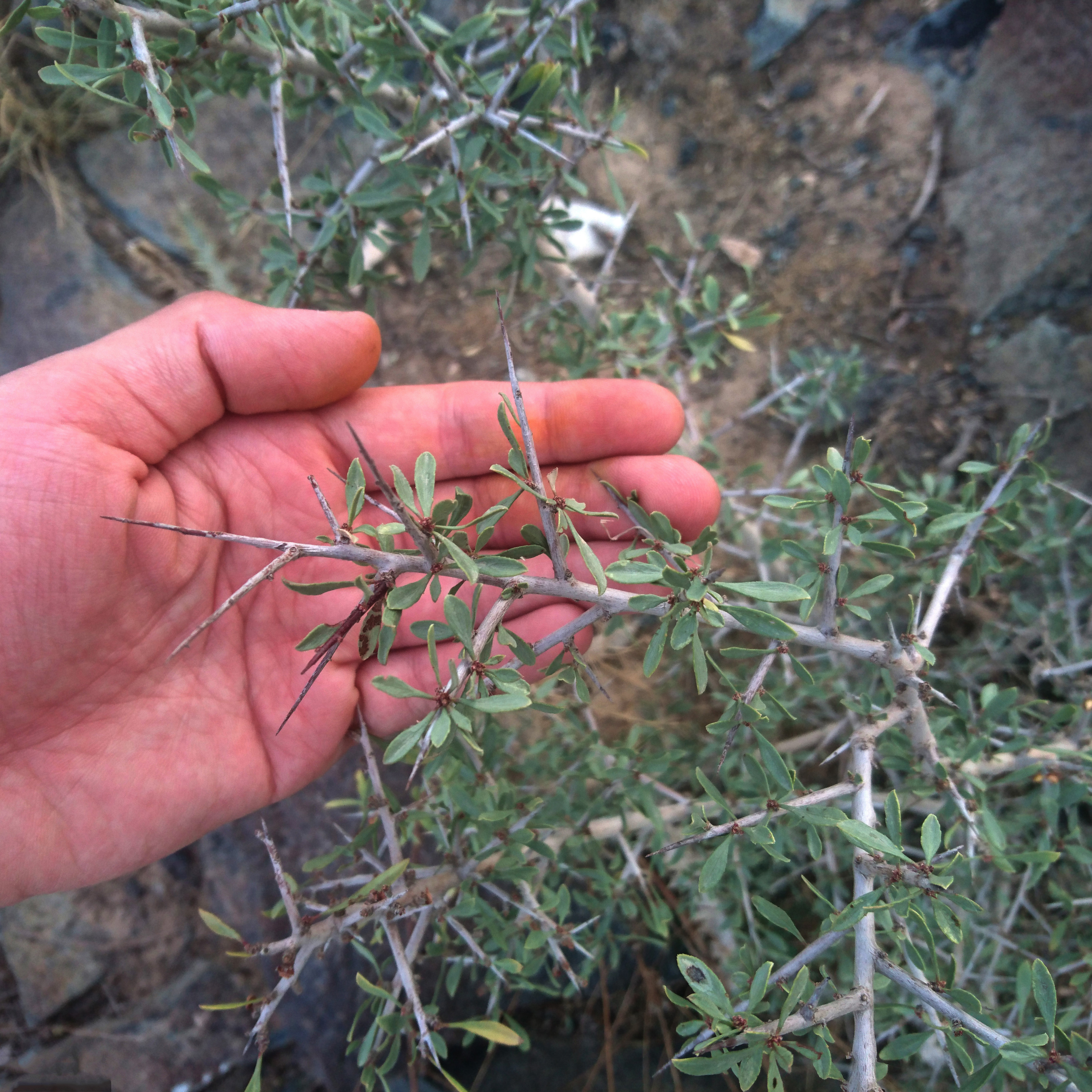

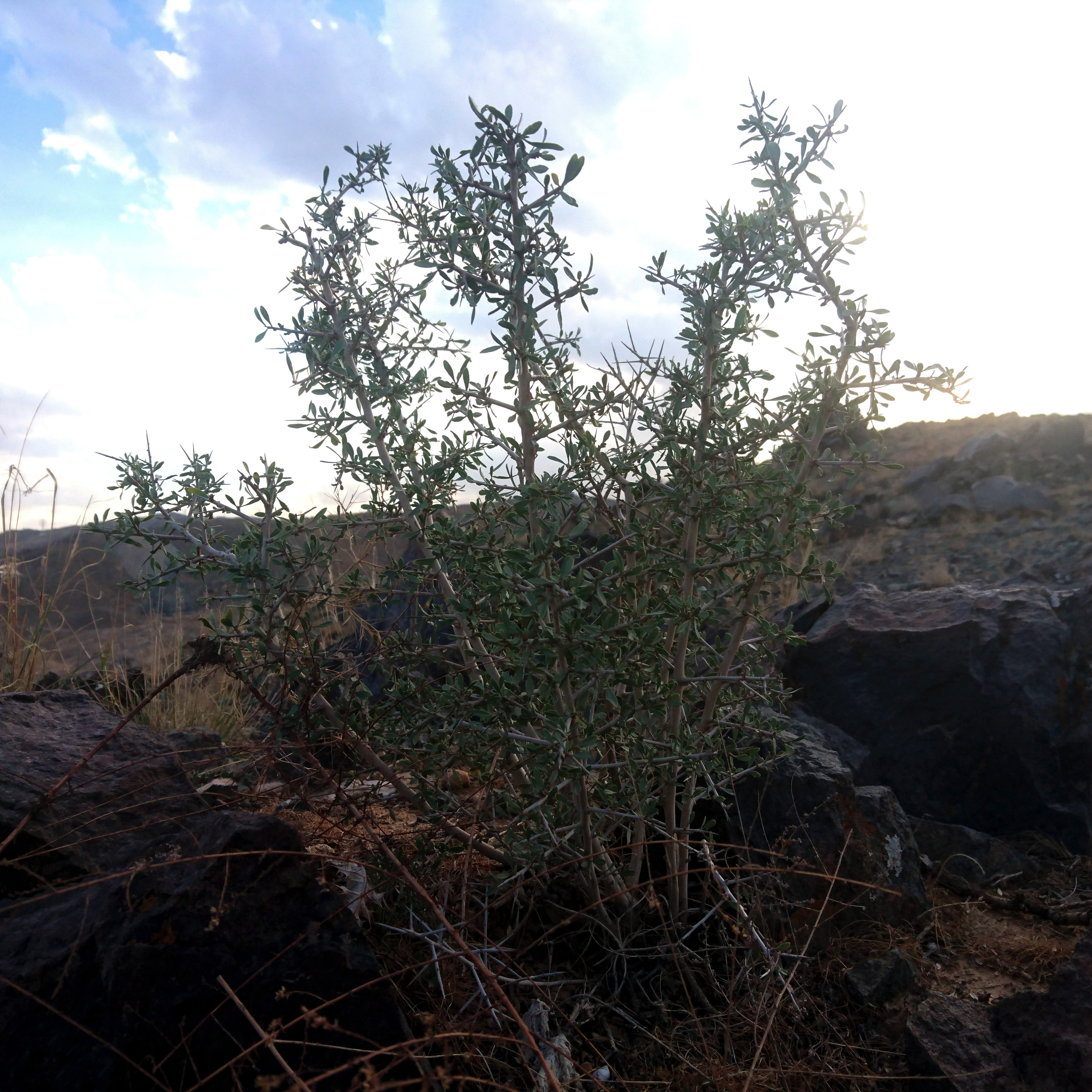

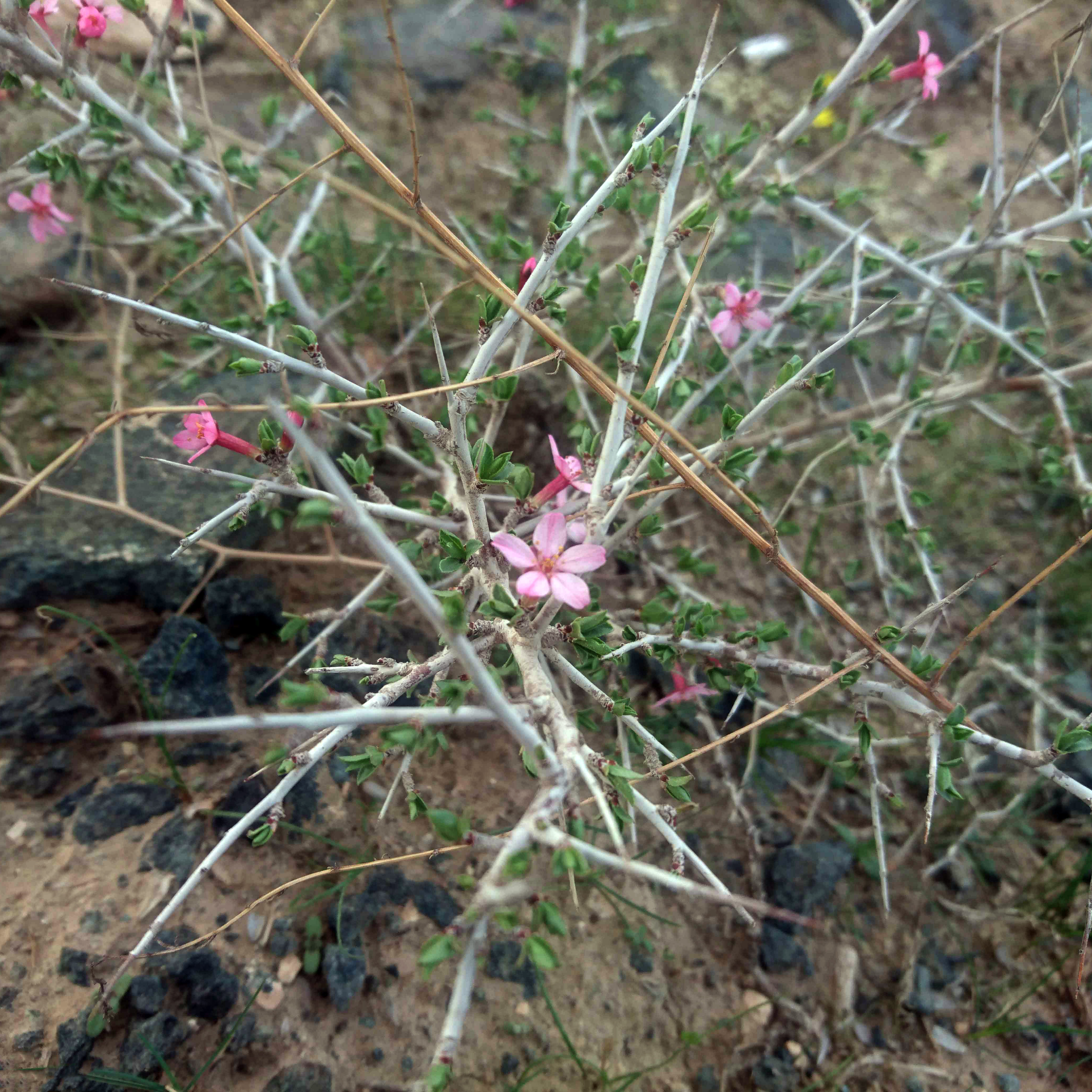

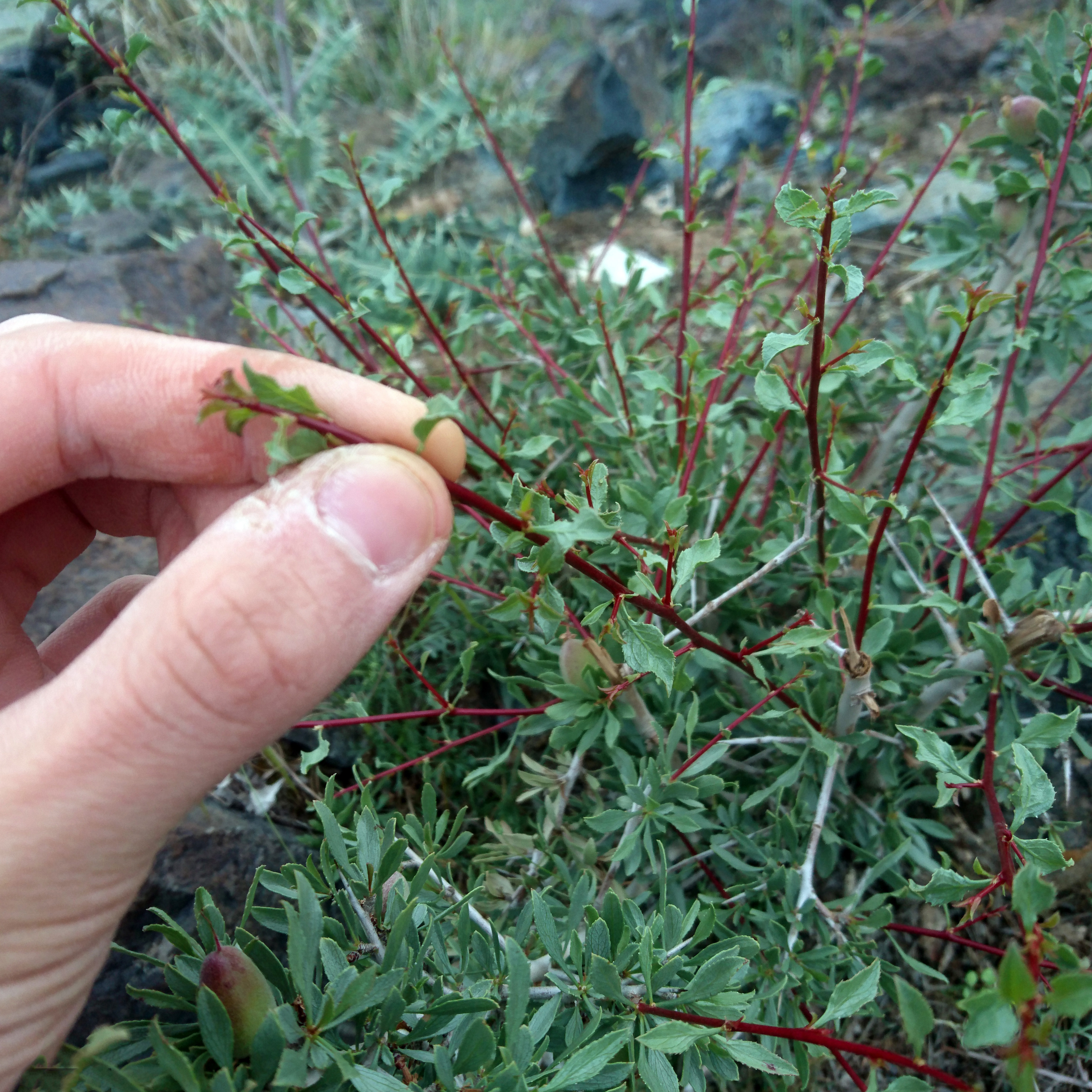

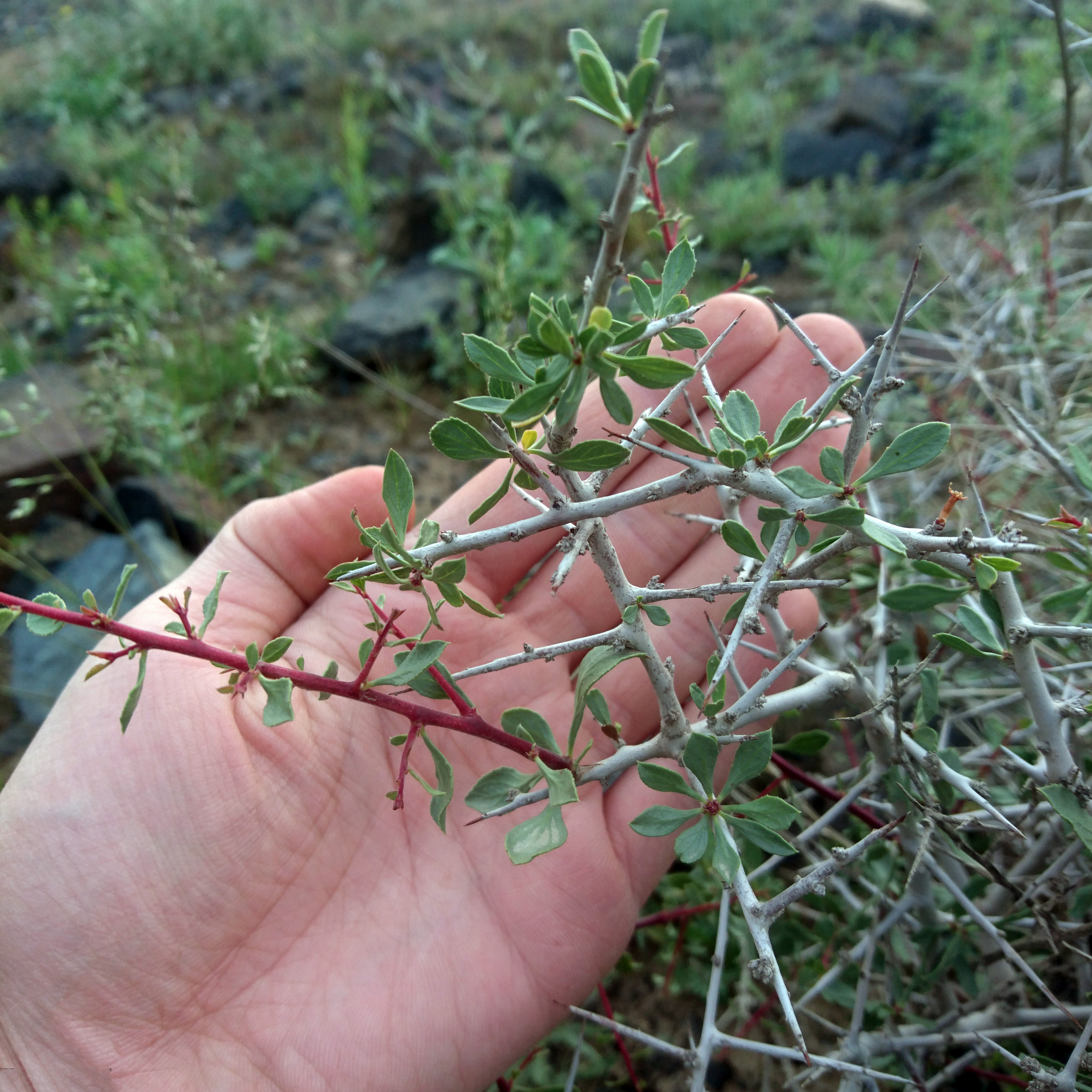

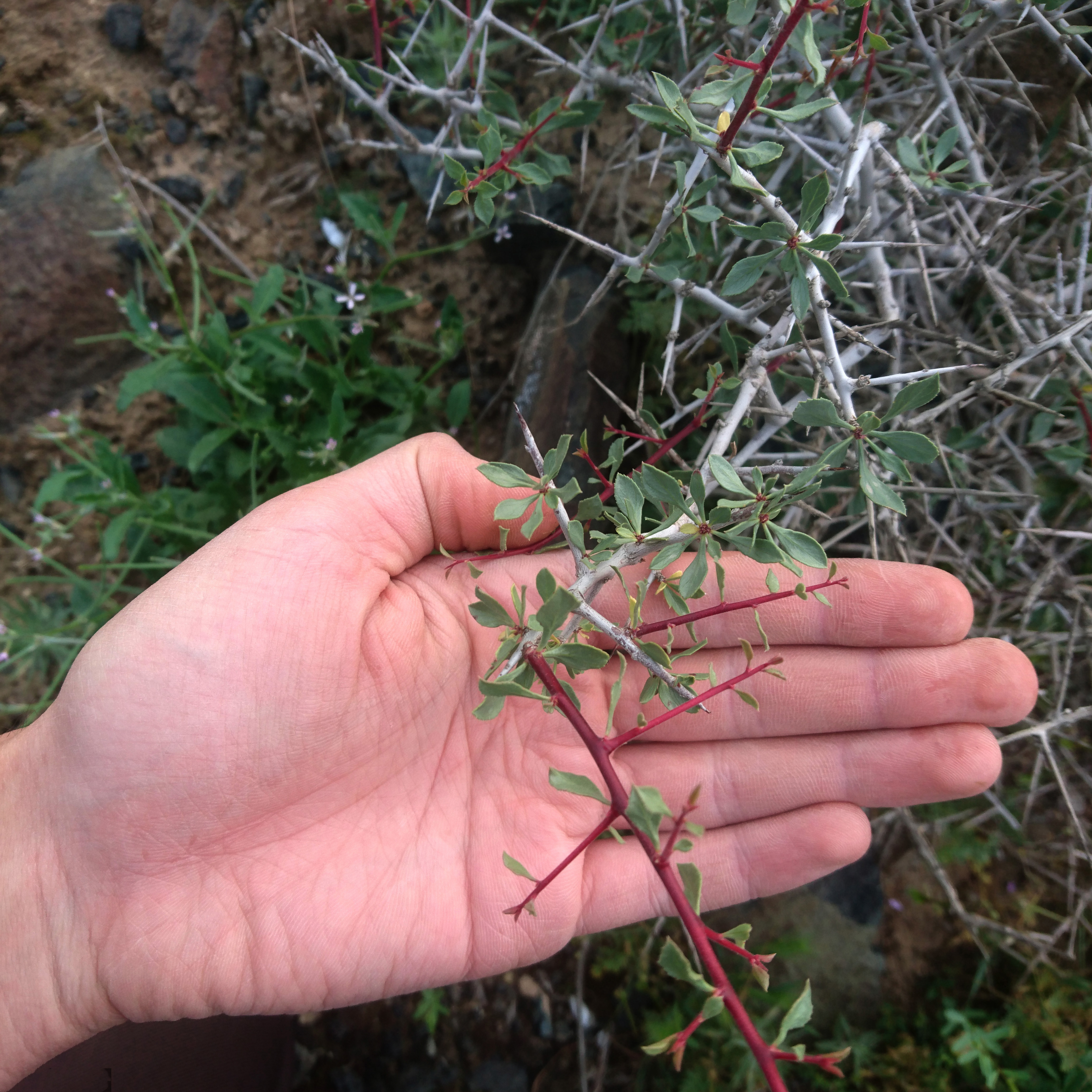

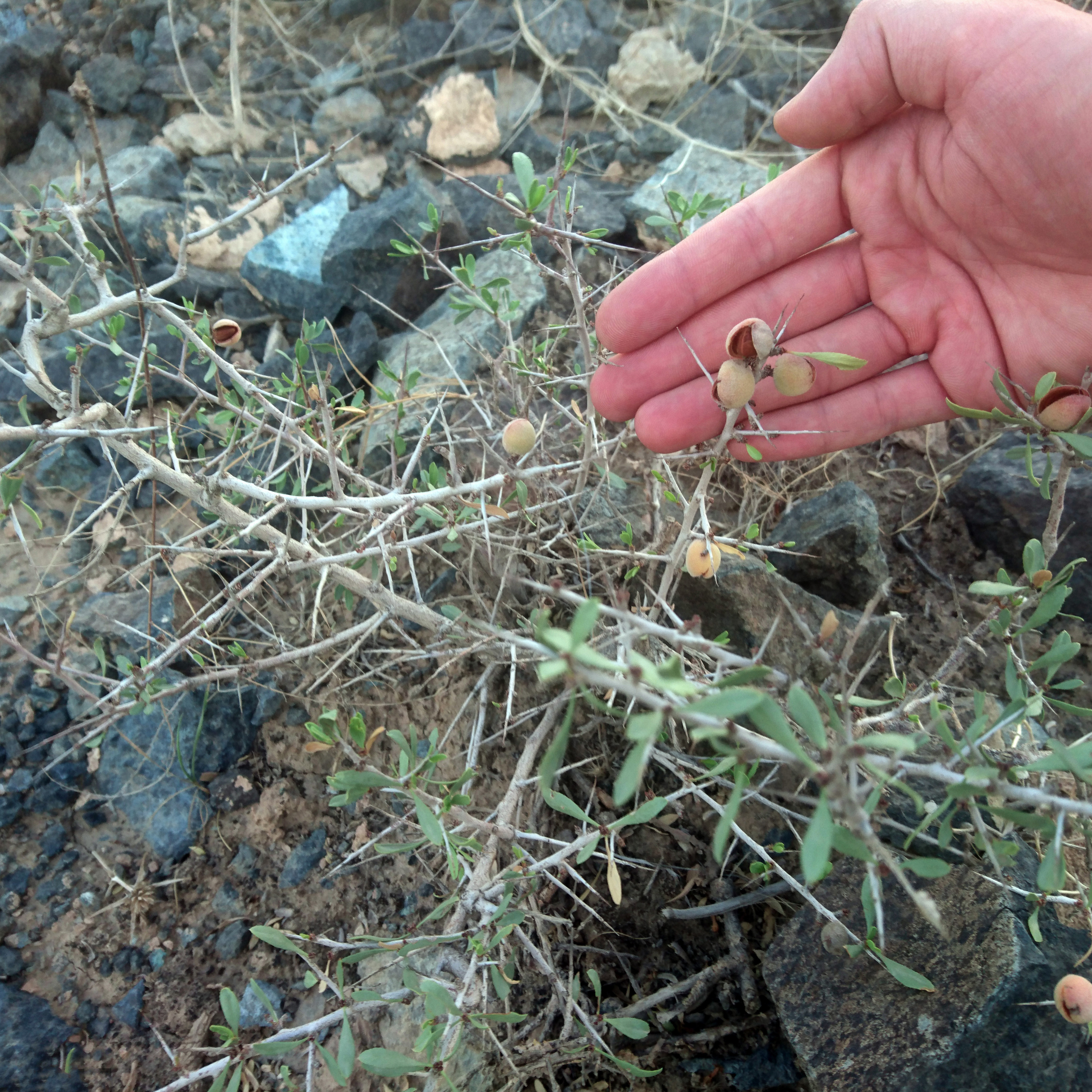

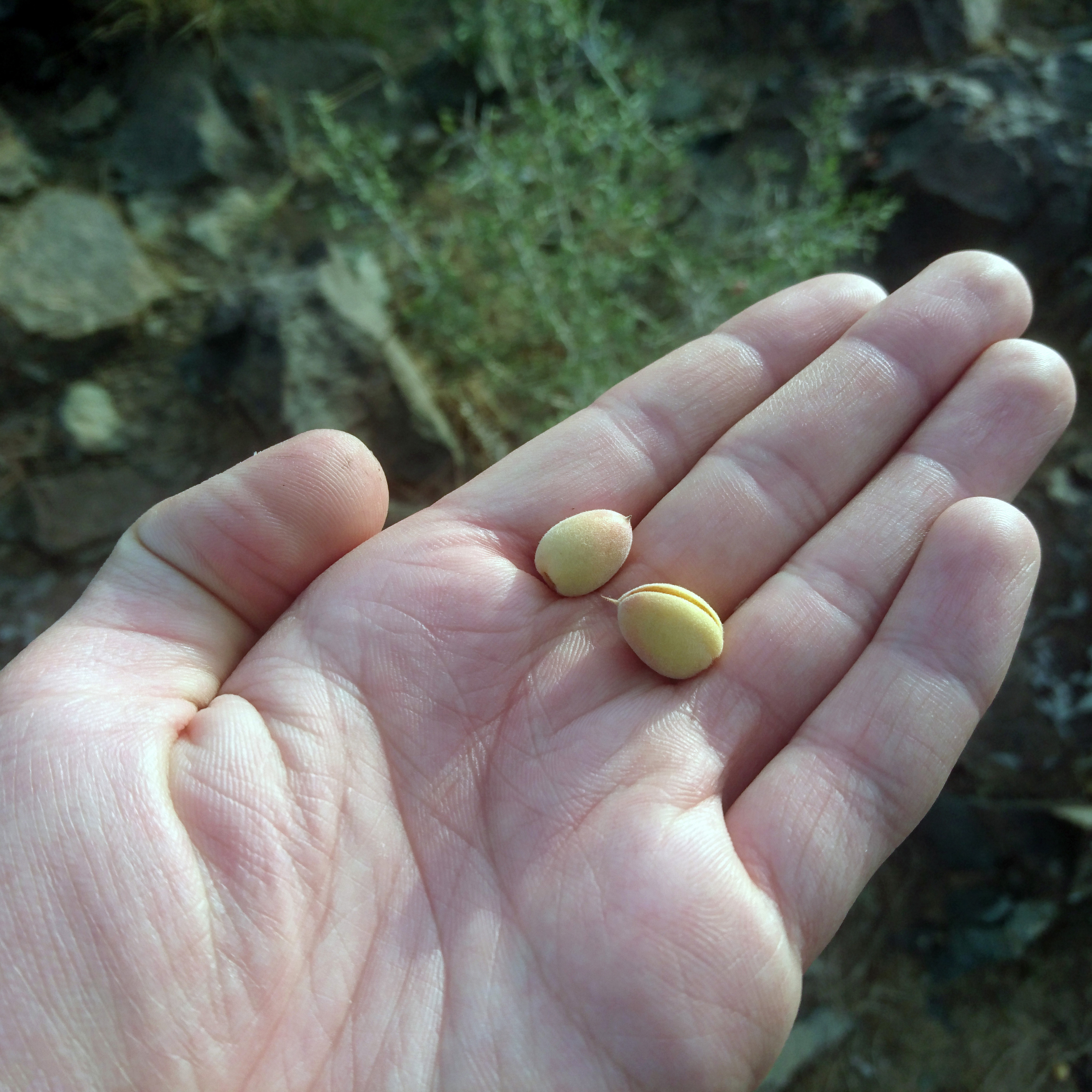

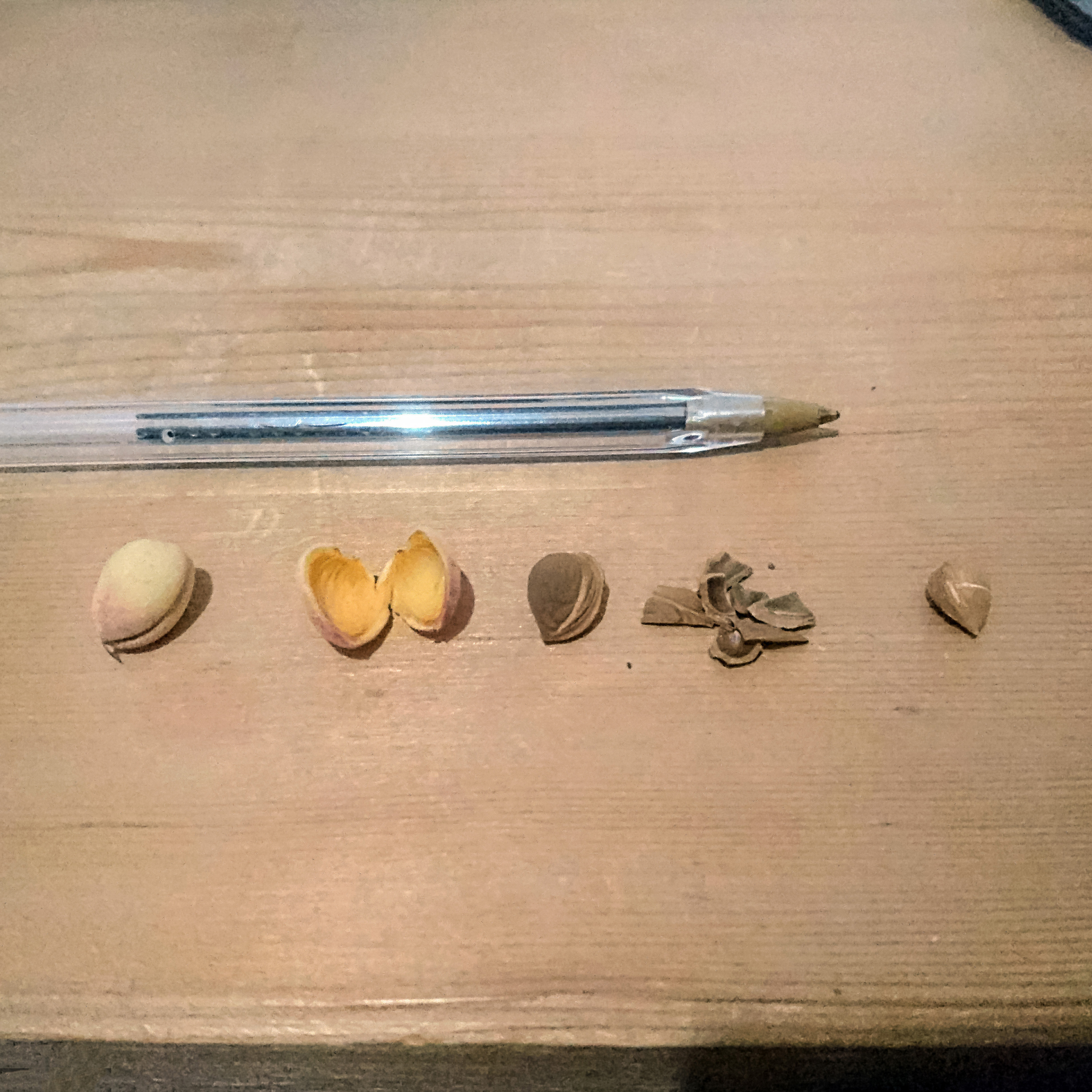

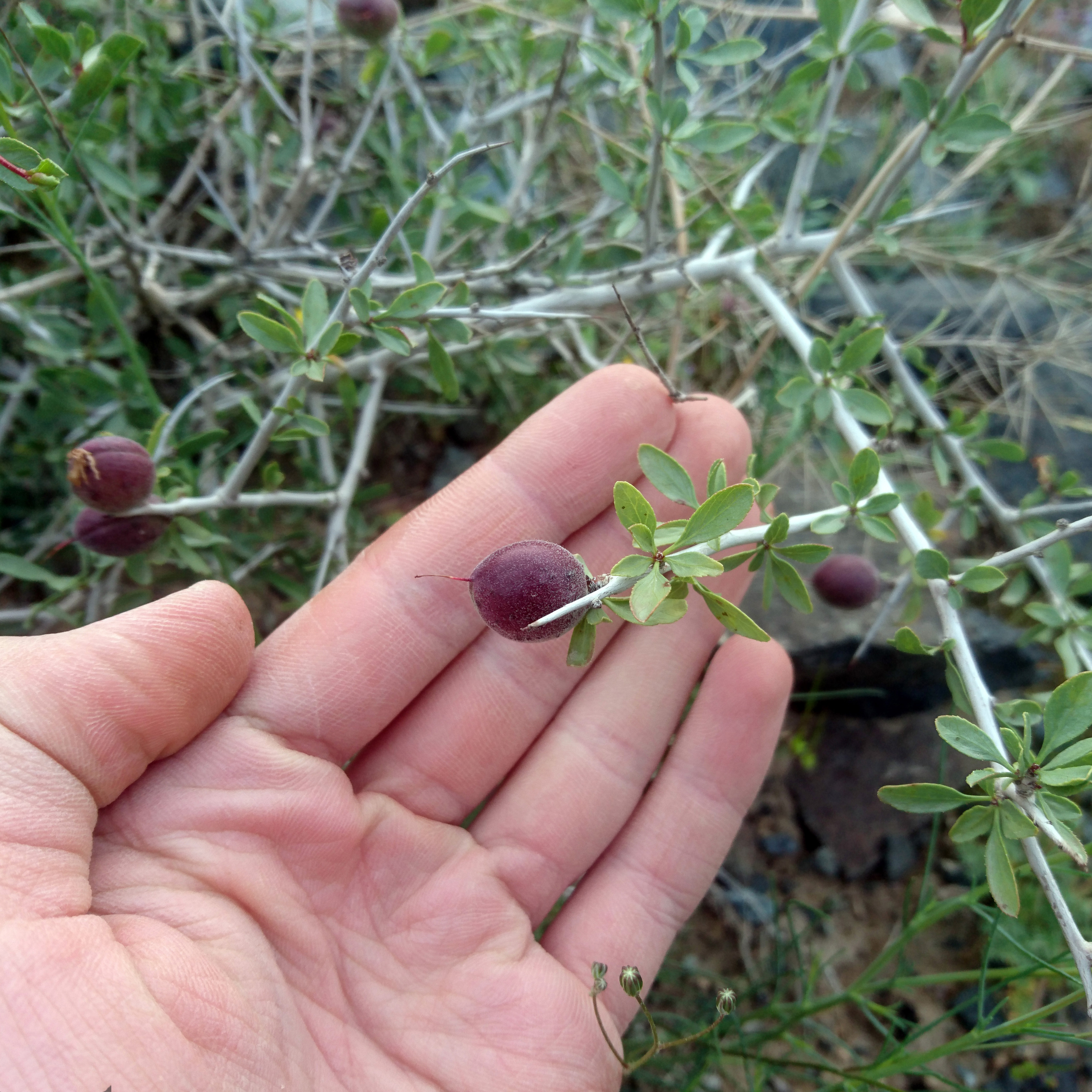

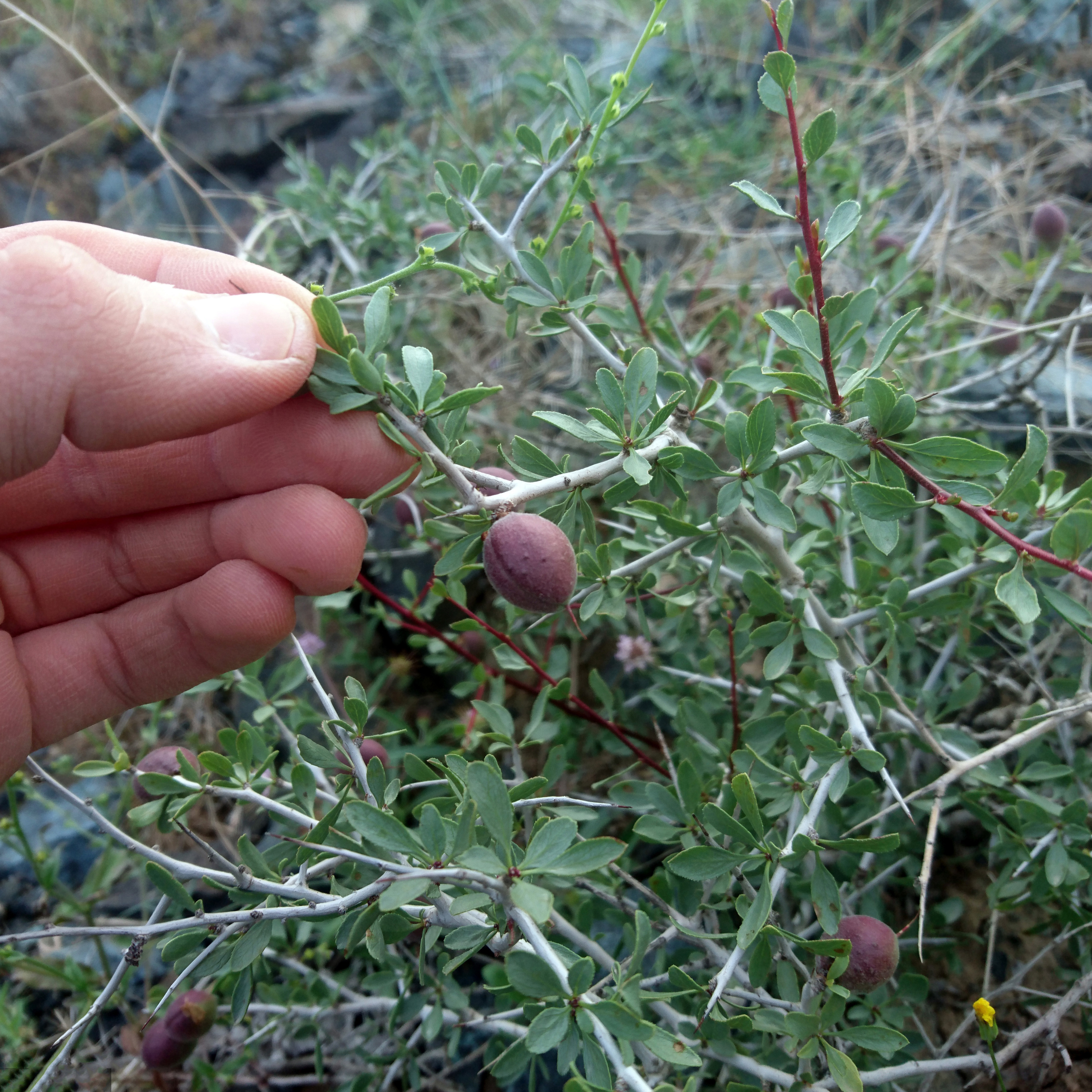

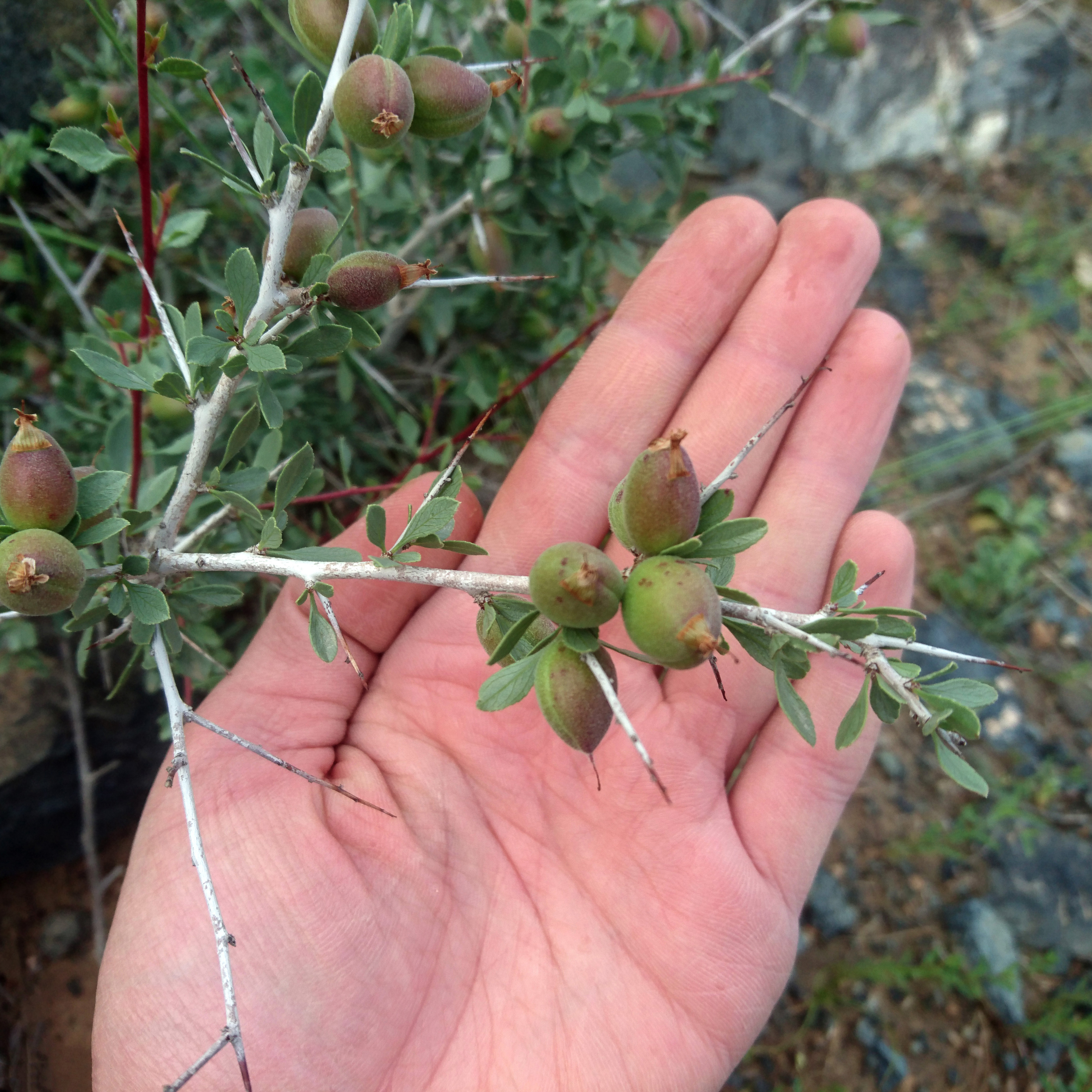

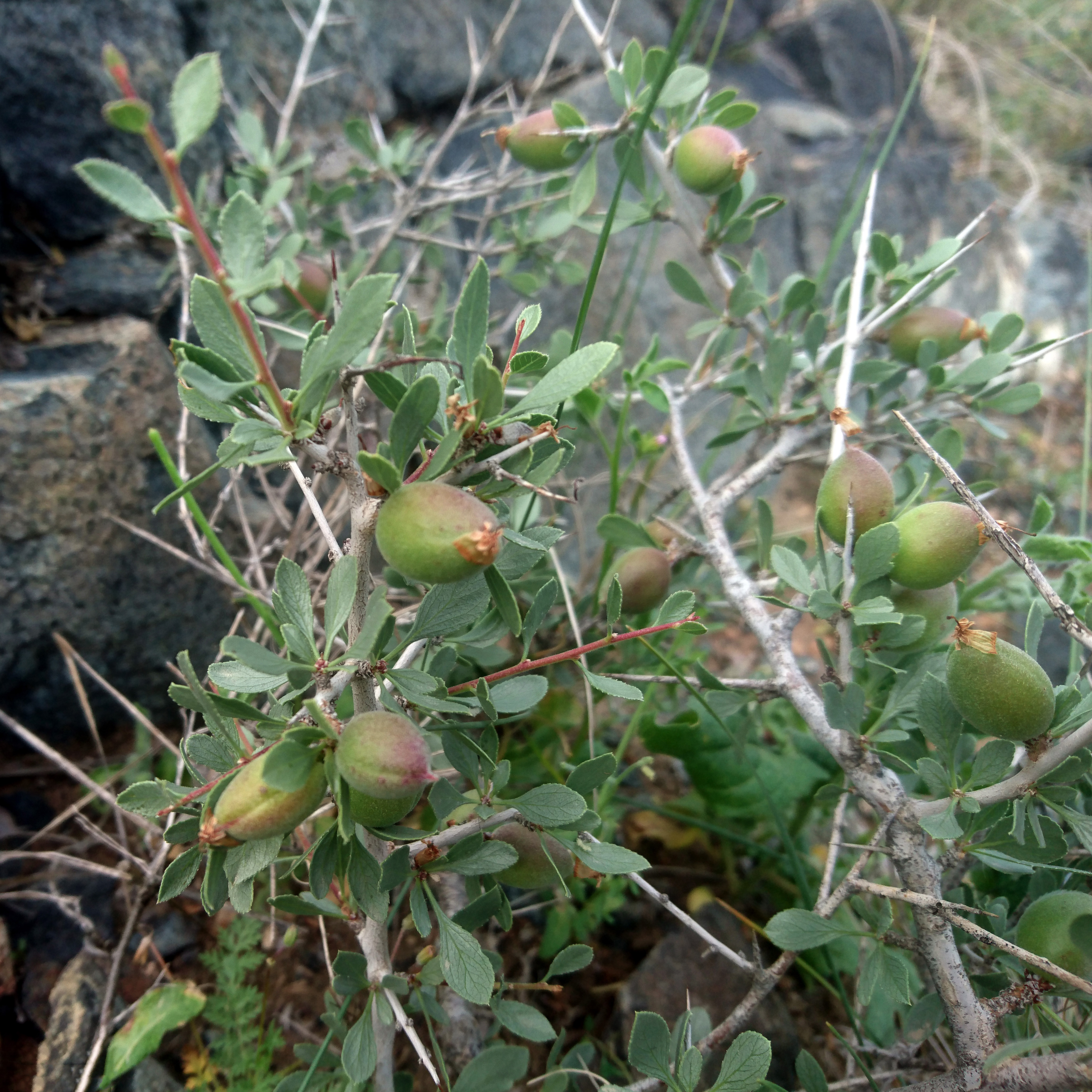

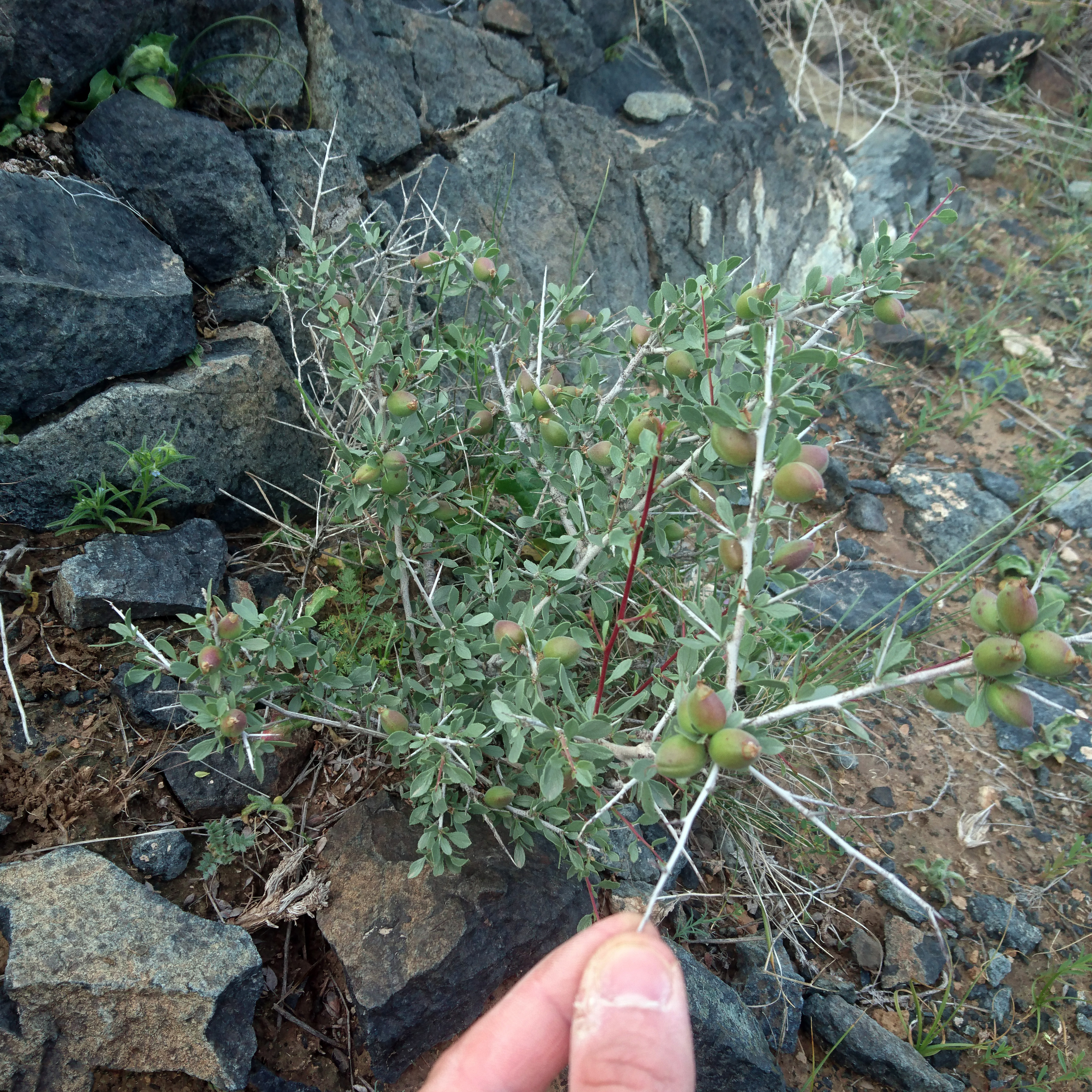

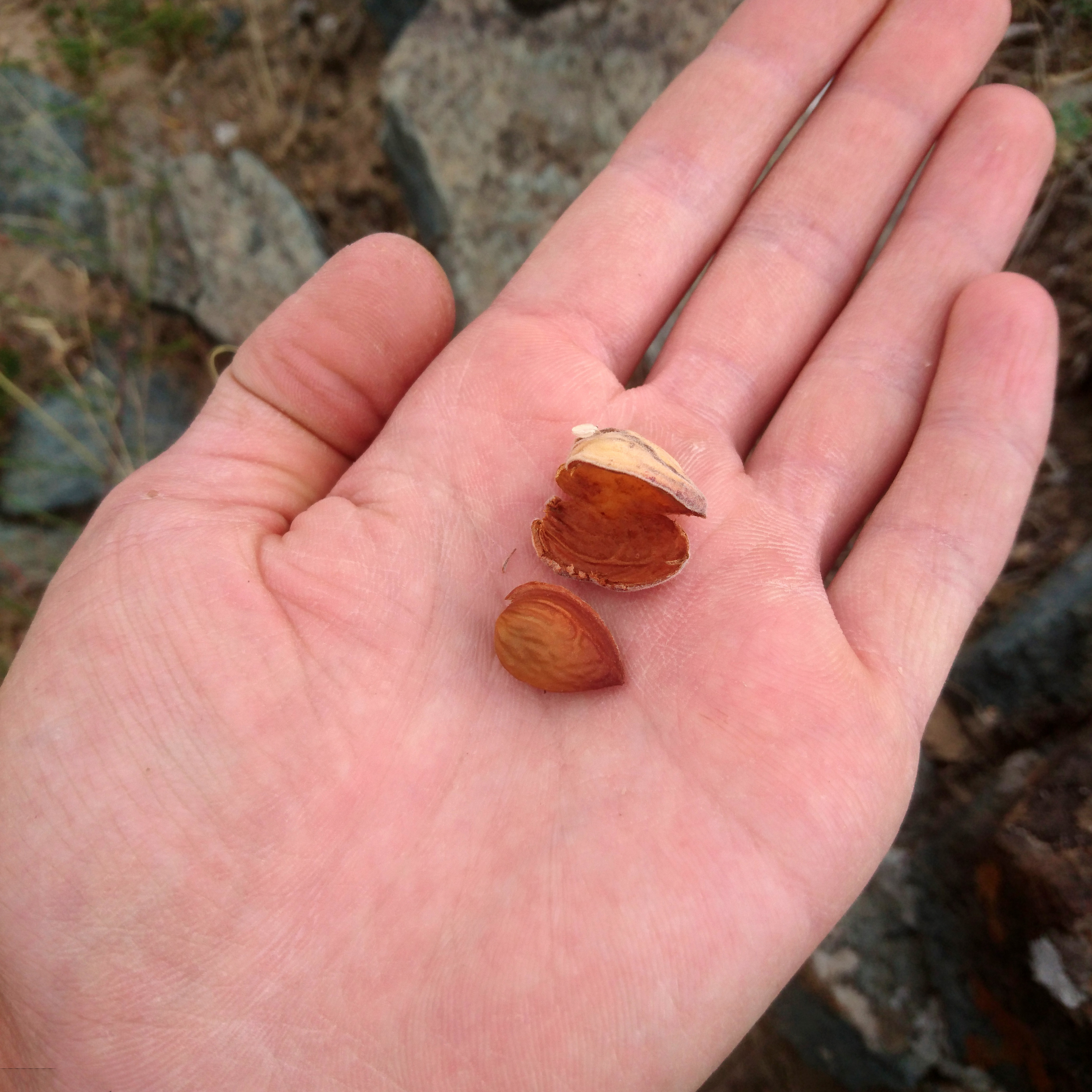

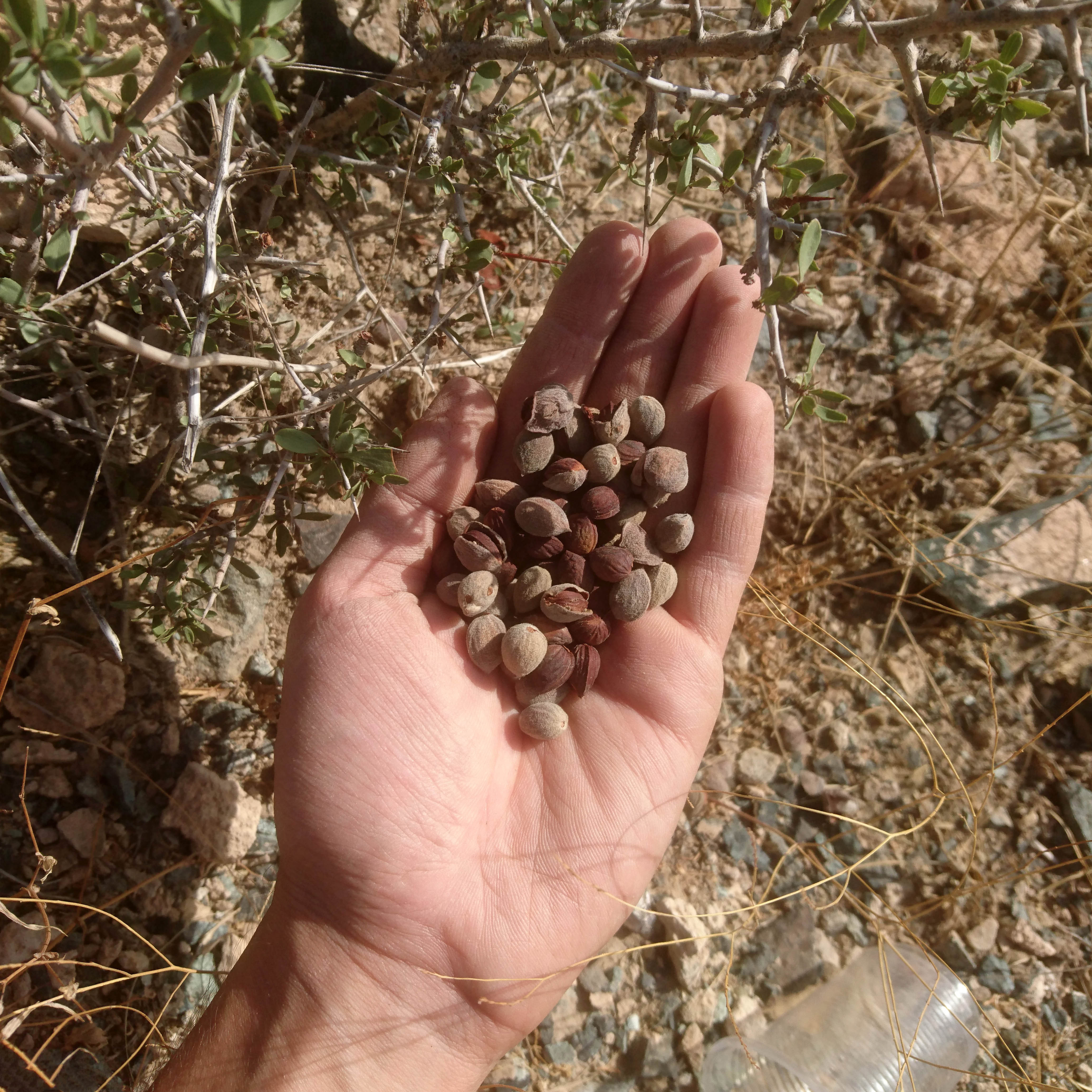
