= Prunus spinosissima =

Scientific classification
- Kingdom: Plantae
- Clade: Tracheophytes
- Clade: Angiosperms
- Clade: Eudicots
- Clade: Rosids
- Order: Rosales
- Family: Rosaceae
- Genus: Prunus
- Species: P. spinosissima

Binomial name
- Prunus spinosissima (Bunge) Franch.

Synonyms
- Amygdalus spinosissima Bunge

Species of wild almond from Central Asia

Prunus spinosissima, the thorny almond, (Uzbek: bodomcha, lit. 'little almond') is a species of wild almond native to dry areas of Central Asia, Afghanistan, and Iran, preferring to grow at 400-1500 m above sea level. It is morphologically similar to Prunus erioclada, P. lycioides, P. eburnea and P. brahuica.

== Description ==
Prunus spinosissima is a shrub reaching 2 m. The bark is brownish-red, turning ash grey with age. The flowers are pink.
