= Caragana ambigua =

Scientific classification
- Kingdom: Plantae
- Clade: Tracheophytes
- Clade: Angiosperms
- Clade: Eudicots
- Clade: Rosids
- Order: Fabales
- Family: Fabaceae
- Subfamily: Faboideae
- Genus: Caragana
- Species: C. ambigua

Binomial name
- Caragana ambigua Stocks

Species of plant

Caragana ambigua is a species of flowering plant in the family Fabaceae. It is traditionally used in Southwest Pakistan for the treatment of diabetes.
