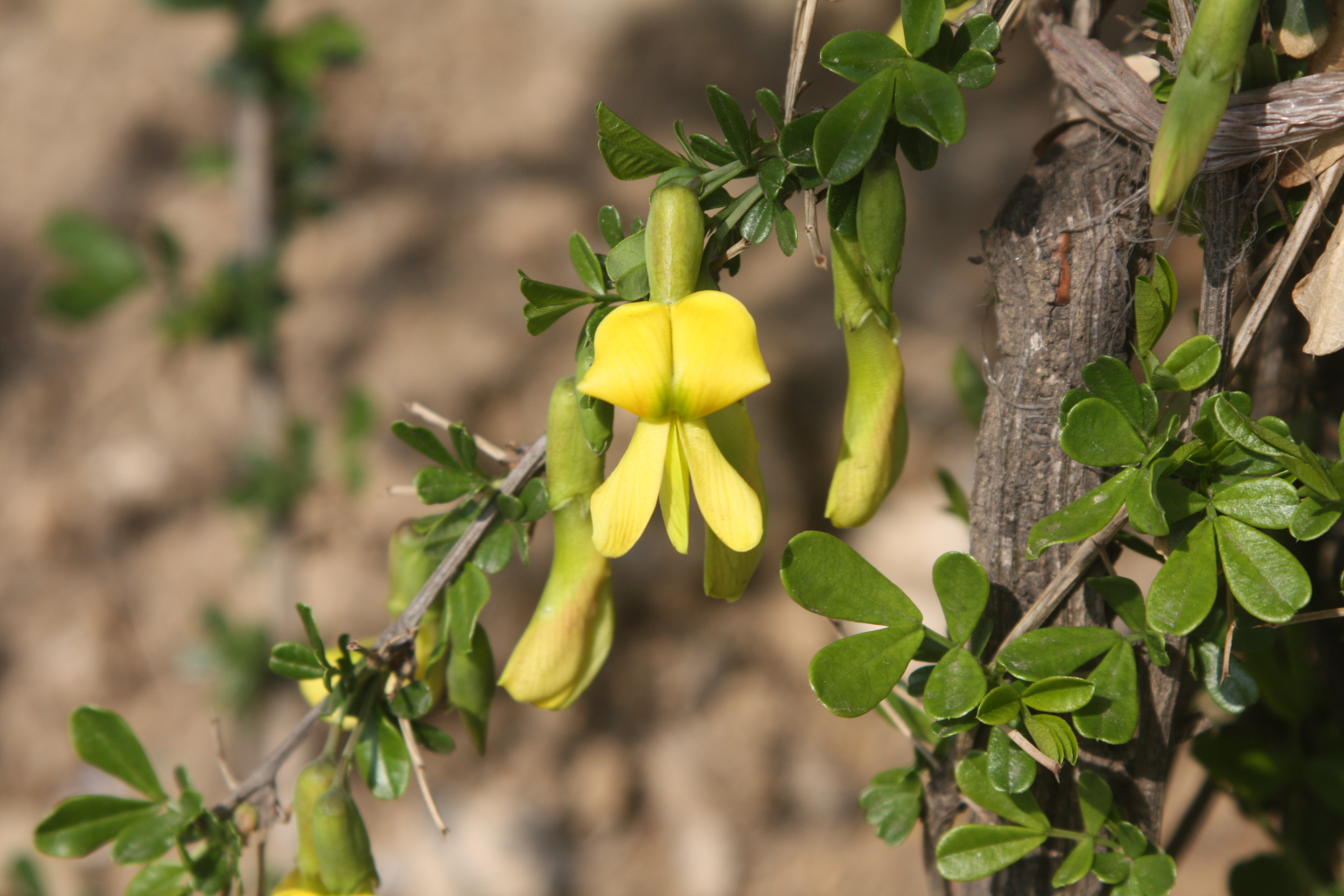
- Caragana sinica

Scientific classification
- Kingdom: Plantae
- Clade: Tracheophytes
- Clade: Angiosperms
- Clade: Eudicots
- Clade: Rosids
- Order: Fabales
- Family: Fabaceae
- Subfamily: Faboideae
- Tribe: Hedysareae
- Genus: Caragana; Lam. (1785)

Type species
- Caragana arborescens Lam.

Sections and species
- See text
- Range of the genus Caragana

Synonyms
- Aspalathus Amman ex Kuntze (1891), nom. illeg.; Halimodendron Fisch. ex DC. (1825)

= Caragana =

Genus of legumes

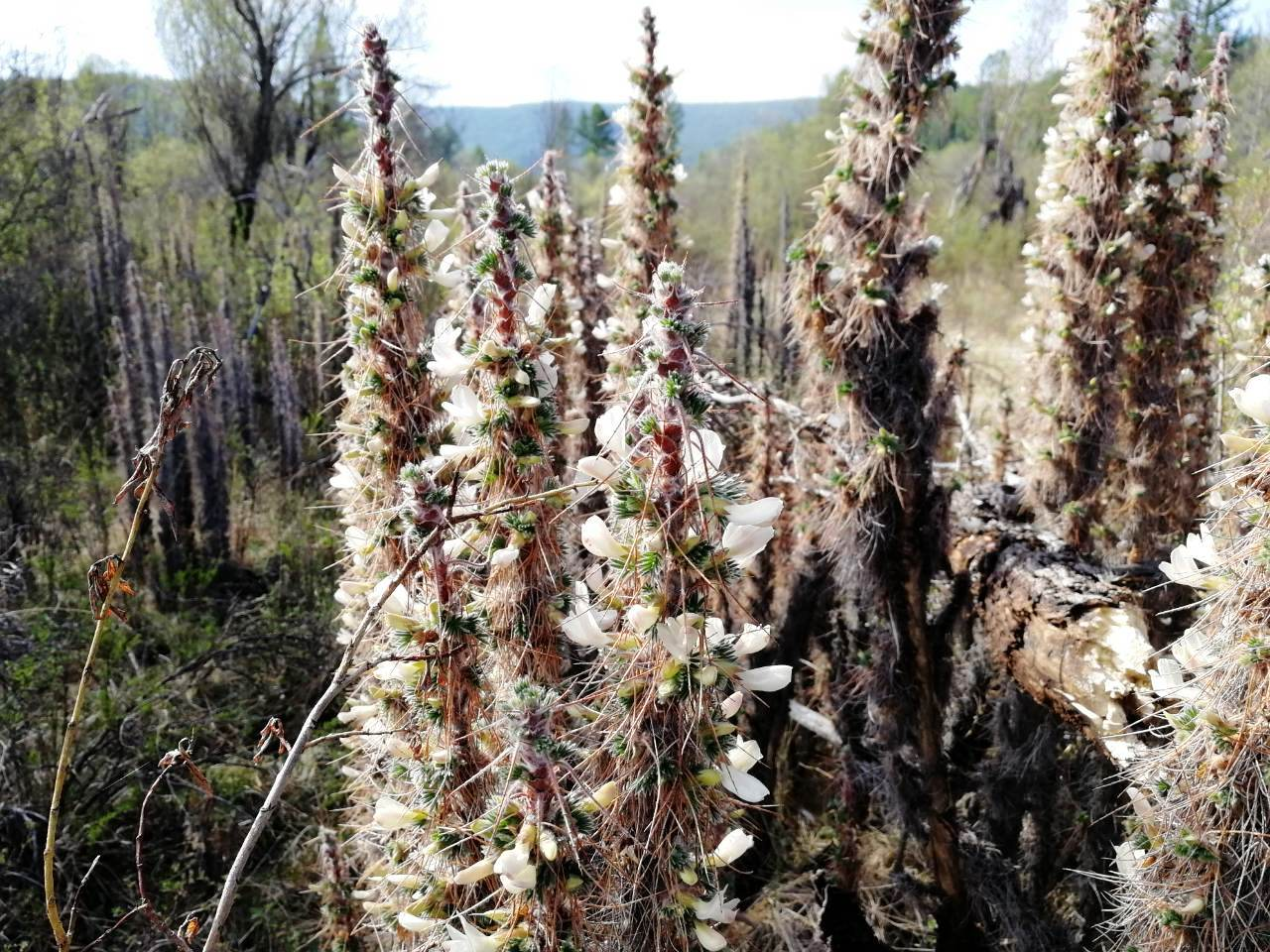
Flowering caragana (camel's tail) in the south of Buryatia, Russia

Caragana is a genus of about 80–100 species of flowering plants in the family Fabaceae, native to Asia and eastern Europe.

They are shrubs or small trees growing 1–6 m (3.3–19.7 ft) tall. They have even-pinnate leaves with small leaflets, and solitary or clustered mostly yellow (rarely white or pink) flowers and bearing seeds in a linear pod.

Caragana species are used as food plants by the larvae of some Lepidoptera species including dark dagger.

== Sections and species ==
=== Section Bracteolatae ===
- Caragana ambigua Stocks
- Caragana bicolor Kom.
- Caragana brevispina Royle ex Benth.
- Caragana conferta Benth. ex Baker
- Caragana franchetiana Kom.
- Caragana gerardiana Royle ex Benth.
- Caragana jubata (Pall.) Poir.
- Caragana sukiensis C.K.Schneid.
- Caragana tibetica (Maxim. ex C.K. Schneid.) Kom.

=== Section Caragana ===
- Caragana arborescens Lam.
- Caragana boisii C.K.Schneid.
- Caragana bungei Ledeb.
- Caragana korshinskii Kom.
- Caragana microphylla Lam.
- Caragana pekinensis Kom.
- Caragana prainii C.K.Schneid.
- Caragana purdomii Rehder
- Caragana soongorica Grubov
- Caragana stipitata Kom.
- Caragana turkestanica Kom.
- Caragana zahlbruckneri C.K.Schneid.

=== Section Frutescentes ===
- Caragana aurantiaca Koehne
- Caragana brevifolia Kom.
- Caragana chinghaiensis Y.X. Liou
- Caragana camilli-schneideri Kom.
- Caragana frutex (L.) K.Koch
- Caragana gobica Sanchir
- Caragana kirghisorum Pojark.
- Caragana laeta Kom.
- Caragana leucophloea Pojark.
- Caragana opulens Kom.
- Caragana polourensis Franch.
- Caragana pygmaea (L.) DC.
- Caragana rosea Turcz. ex Kom.
- Caragana sinica (Buc'hoz) Rehder
- Caragana stenophylla Pojark.
- Caragana tangutica Maxim. ex Kom.
- Caragana ussuriensis (Regel) Pojark.
- Caragana versicolor Benth.

=== Unnamed section ===
- Caragana bongardiana (Fisch. & C.A. Mey.) Pojark.
- Caragana changduensis Y.X. Liou
- Caragana pleiophylla (Regel) Pojark.
- Caragana roborovskyi Kom.
- Caragana tragacanthoides (Pall.) Poir.

=== Basal species ===
- Caragana acanthophylla Kom.
- Caragana dasyphylla Pojark.
- Caragana hololeuca Bunge ex Kom.
- Caragana spinosa (L.) Vahl ex Hornem.

=== Incertae sedis ===
- Caragana afghanica Kitam.
- Caragana alaica Pojark.
- Caragana alaschanica Grubov
- Caragana alexeenkoi Kamelin
- Caragana alpina Y.X. Liou
- Caragana arcuata Y.X. Liou
- Caragana balchaschensis (Kom.) Pojark.
- Caragana beefensis S.N. Biswas
- Caragana brachypoda Pojark.
- Caragana buriatica Peschkova
- Caragana campanulata Vassilcz.
- Caragana cinerea (Kom.) N.S. Pavlova
- Caragana crassipina C. Marquand
- Caragana cuneato-alata Y.X. Liou
- Caragana decorticans Hemsl.
- Caragana densa Kom.
- Caragana erinacea Kom.
- Caragana fruticosa (Pall.) Besser
- Caragana grandiflora (M. Bieb.) DC.
- Caragana halodendron (Pall.) Dum.Cours.
- Caragana kansuensis Pojark.
- Caragana kozlowii Kom.
- Caragana leucospina Kom.
- Caragana leveillei Kom.
- Caragana limprichtii Harms
- Caragana litwinowii Kom.
- Caragana maimanensis Rech. f.
- Caragana manshurica (Kom.) Kom.
- Caragana polyacantha Royle
- Caragana × prestoniae R.J. Moore
- Caragana scythica (Kom.) Pojark.
- Caragana shensiensis C.W. Chang
- Caragana × sophorifolia Tausch
- Caragana spinifera Kom.
- Caragana turfanensis (Krasn.) Kom.
- Caragana ulicina Stocks

== Range maps ==
Range of the genus Caragana

Range of the section Bracteolatae

Range of the section Caragana

Range of the section Frutescentes
