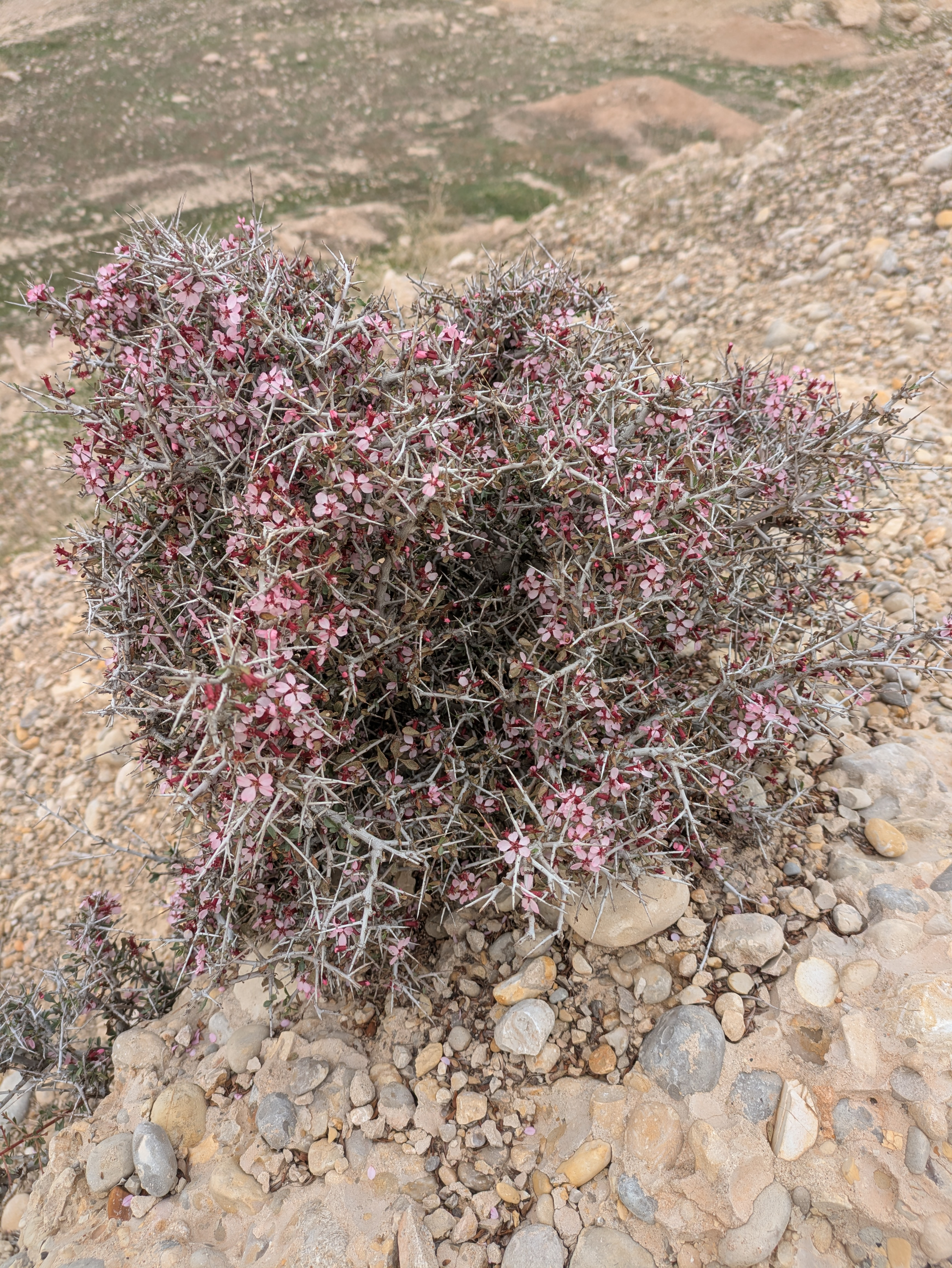
- Habit
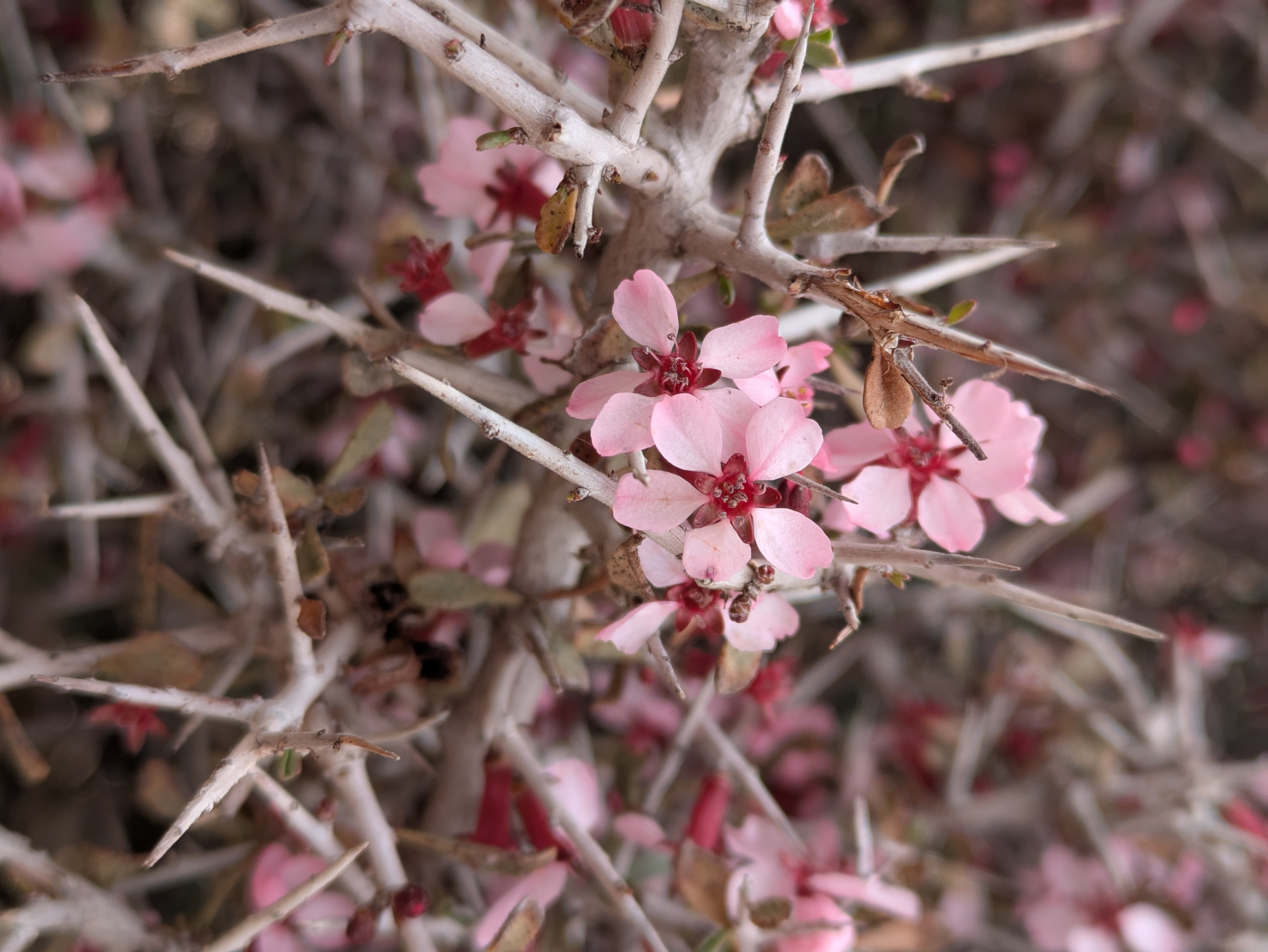
- Flowers

Scientific classification
- Kingdom: Plantae
- Clade: Tracheophytes
- Clade: Angiosperms
- Clade: Eudicots
- Clade: Rosids
- Order: Rosales
- Family: Rosaceae
- Genus: Prunus
- Species: P. eburnea

Binomial name
- Prunus eburnea (Spach) C.K.Schneider

Synonyms
- Prunus eburnea (Spach) Aitch.; Amygdalus eburnea Spach; Amygdalopsis eburnea (Spach) M. J. Roem.; Amygdalus scorpius Spach.; Amygdalopsis scorpius (Spach) M. J. Roem.; Amygdalus furcatus Spach.; Amygdalopsis furcata (Spach) M. J. Roem.; Amygdalus spathulata Boiss.

= Prunus eburnea =

Species of flowering plant

Prunus eburnea is a species of wild almond native to Iran, Pakistan and Afghanistan . It is a dense shrub 0.2 to 1.2 m tall with gray bark. It is morphologically similar to Prunus lycioides, P. spinosissima, P. erioclada and P. brahuica. It can be distinguished from the similar species by having a pubescent hypanthium.

A genetic and morphological analysis shows that it is a good species, with its closest relative being Prunus erioclada. The cross of Prunus scoparia and Prunus eburnea produces Prunus × iranshahrii. (Note: Called Amygdalus scoparia, Amygdalus eburnea and Amygdalus × iranshahrii, respectively, by the source.)
