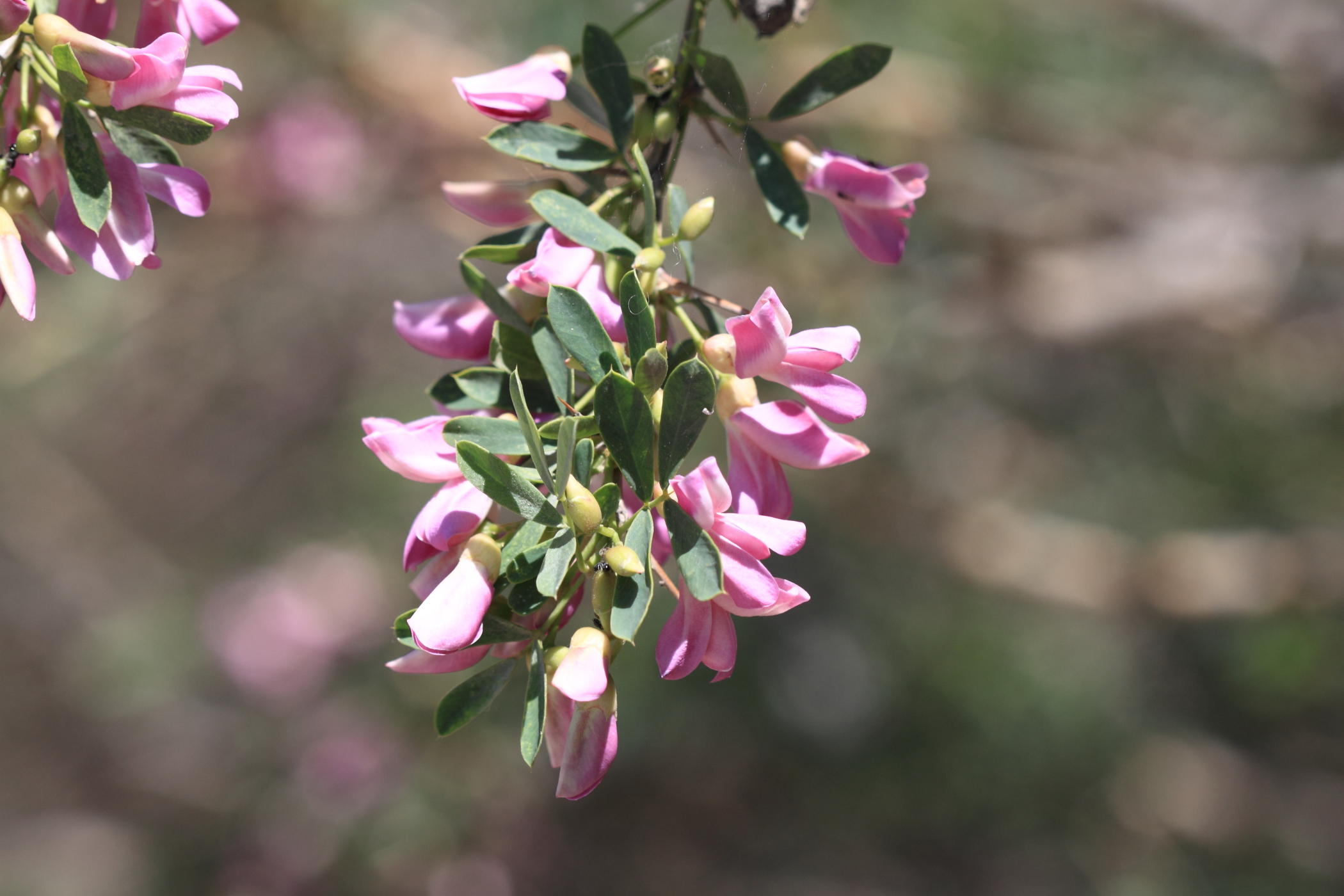

Scientific classification
- Kingdom: Plantae
- Clade: Embryophytes
- Clade: Tracheophytes
- Clade: Spermatophytes
- Clade: Angiosperms
- Clade: Eudicots
- Clade: Rosids
- Order: Fabales
- Family: Fabaceae
- Subfamily: Faboideae
- Genus: Caragana
- Species: C. halodendron

Binomial name
- Caragana halodendron (Pall.) Dum.Cours. (1802)

Synonyms
- Caragana argentea Lam. (1785); Halimodendron argenteum (Lam.) Fisch. ex DC. (1825); Halimodendron argenteum var. albiflorum Kar. & Kir. (1842); Halimodendron cuspidatum Jaub. & Spach (1842); Halimodendron emarginatum Jaub. & Spach (1842); Halimodendron halodendron (Pall.) Voss (1895); Halimodendron halodendron var. albiflorum (Kar. & Kir.) Prjech. (1970); Halimodendron halodendron f. purpureum C.K.Schneid. (1907); Halimodendron speciosum Carrière (1876); Halimodendron subvirescens G.Don (1832); Halimodendron triflorum (L'Hér.) Sweet (1830); Pseudo-acacia halodendron (Pall.) Moench (1794); Robinia halimodendron Link (1831), orth. var.; Robinia halodendron Pall. (1773); Robinia triflora L'Hér. (1791)

= Caragana halodendron =

Species of legume

Caragana halodendron is a species of flowering plant in the pea family (Fabaceae), native to a wide area of central Asia from Turkey in the west, south to Pakistan, north to southern Russia, and east to northeastern China; it typically grows on saline soils. It is known by several common names, including salt tree, common salt tree and Russian salt tree. It was formerly treated in its own genus as Halimodendron halodendron, but genetic analysis proved it to be embedded within the genus Caragana.

== Description ==
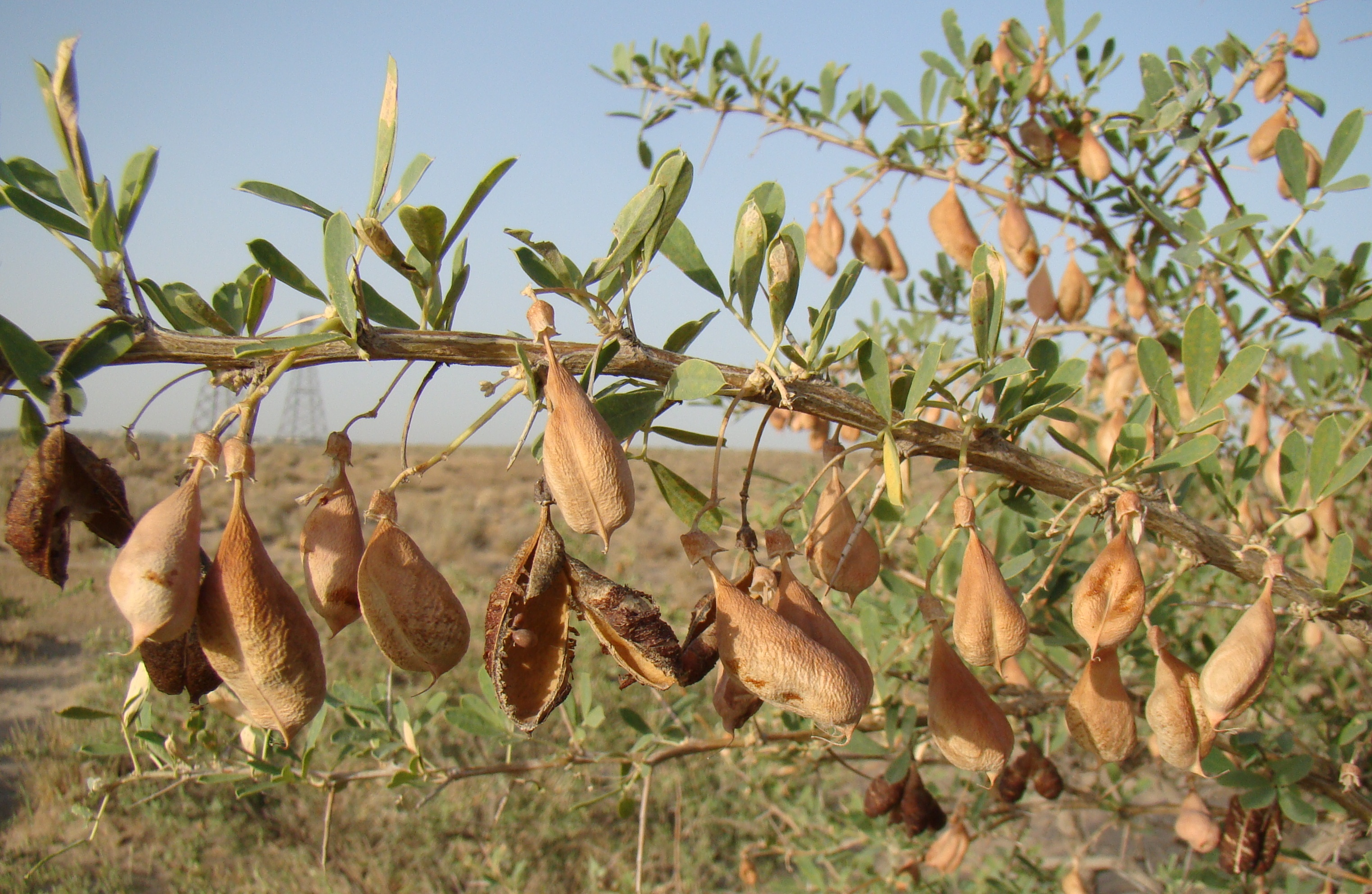
Showing the inflated seed pods

It is a spiny deciduous shrub growing to 0.5–2 metres (1 ft 8 in – 6 ft 7 in) tall with dark grey-brown bark. The ends of twigs narrow to spines. The leaves are pinnate with two or four leaflets in one or two pairs and two spine-like basal stipules; they are glaucous grey-green with silky white hairs when young, becoming glabrous. The leaflets are 1.2–3.5 cm long and 0.6 1 cm broad. The flowers are produced on short racemes with 1–5 flowers; they are typical pea-flowers, pink to pale purple, 10–15 mm long. The seeds are produced in an inflated yellow-brown pod 1.5–3 cm long and 0.5–1.2 cm broad.

The plant has a deep and wide root system, with the lateral roots sending up new shoots. In this manner the plant forms extensive thickets.

== Cultivation ==
It is sometimes cultivated as an introduced species for its attractive flowers and ability to grow on difficult saline soils that few other plants tolerate. It is used for shelterbelts in Canada. It is naturalised in Central European Russia, Ukraine (including Crimea), the North Caucasus, and West Siberia; and in North America in Saskatchewan and Utah. It is sometimes a noxious weed. When introduced to areas of suitable climate, such as California where it is a known weed, it can invade cultivated land and spread relatively quickly.
