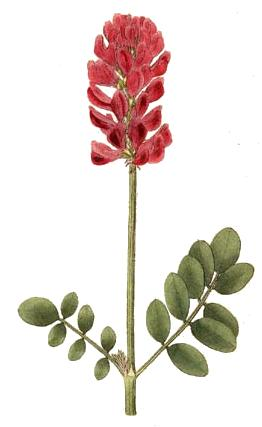
- Hedysarum coronarium

Scientific classification
- Kingdom: Plantae
- Clade: Tracheophytes
- Clade: Angiosperms
- Clade: Eudicots
- Clade: Rosids
- Order: Fabales
- Family: Fabaceae
- Subfamily: Faboideae
- Tribe: Hedysareae
- Genus: Hedysarum; L. (1753)

Type species
- Hedysarum coronarium L.

Synonyms
- Banalia Bubani (1899), nom. illeg.; Sartoria Boiss. (1849); Stracheya Benth. (1853)

= Hedysarum =

Genus of legumes

Hedysarum (sweetvetch) is a genus of the botanical family Fabaceae, consisting of about 200 species of annual or perennial herbs found in Asia, Europe, North Africa, and North America.

== Description ==
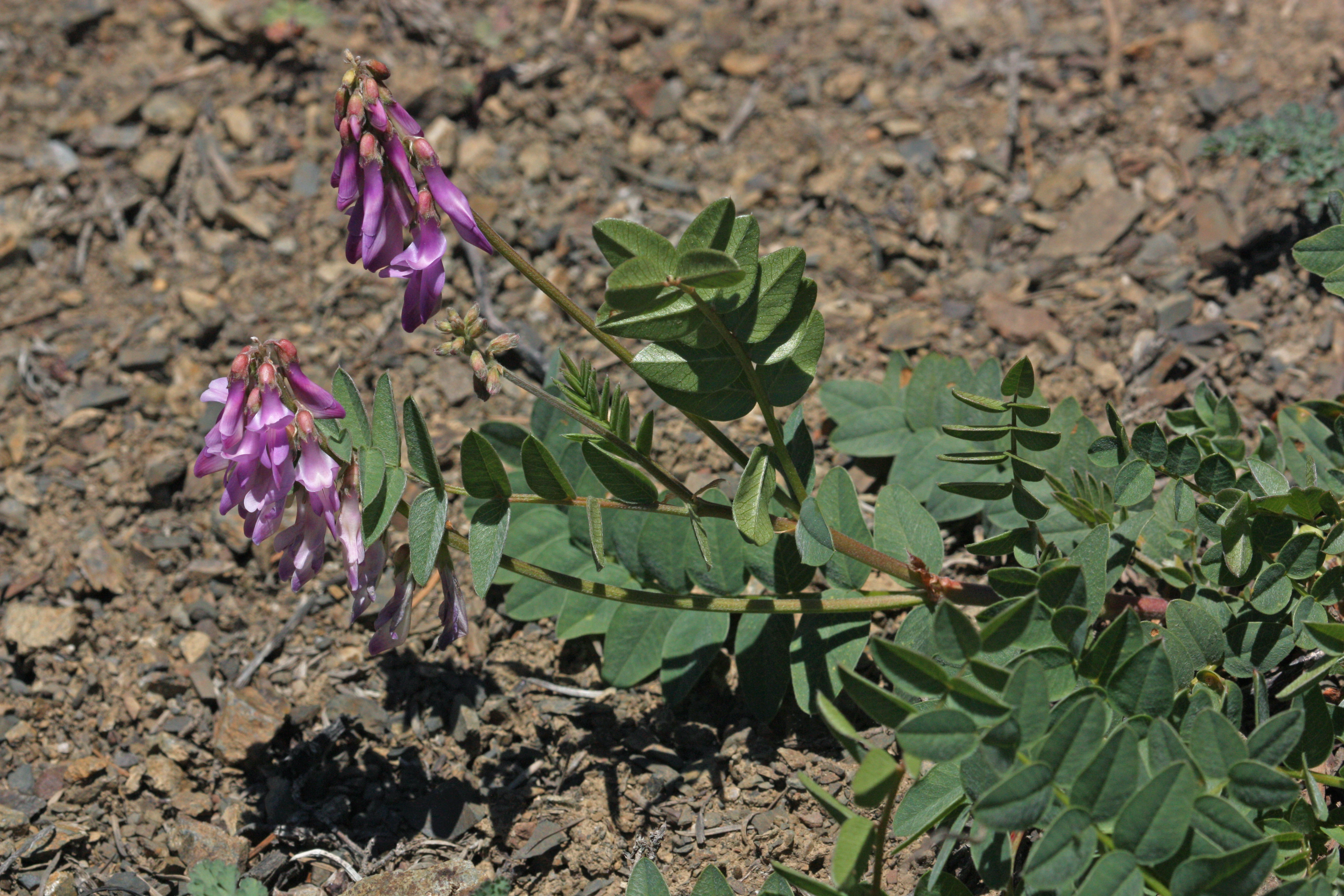
Hedysarum occidentale is a herbaceous subalpine to alpine species of western North America.

Species within genus Hedysarum may be herbaceous plants or deciduous shrubs. They have odd-pinnate leaves, with entire leaflets (no notches or indentations). These leaves resemble the leaves of sweet peas. The stipules may be free or connate, and stipels (secondary stipules) are absent.

The inflorescences are peduncled racemes or heads. Bracts are small, with bracteoles below the calyx, and calyx teeth subequal. The petals may be pink, purplish, yellow, or whitish. Vexillum is longer than the wings, with an obtuse keel longer or rarely shorter than the wings. Stamens are diadelphous, 9+1, and anthers uniform. Ovary is 2-8-ovuled. Fruit is a lomentum, with segments that are glabrous, pubescent, bristly, or spiny, and break into single-seeded sections on ripening.

== Uses ==
Hedysarum species are used as food plants by the larvae of some Lepidoptera (moth and butterfly) species including Coleophora accordella. Some species, such as Hedysarum alpinum also known as Alpine sweetvetch or wild potato, were eaten by the Inuit to help ward off the effects of scurvy due to it being rich in vitamin C, containing about 21 mg/100g.

In his book Into the Wild, Jon Krakauer speculated that Christopher McCandless may have died from eating seeds of H. alpinum, which Krakauer thought might contain swainsonine. This theory was later debunked by experts in the field of botany. Krakauer subsequently postulated that the seeds were stored wet in a plastic bag, which may have created a toxic by-product.

Krakauer was later validated, to a certain extent. Krakauer explains that he came across the research of Ronald Hamilton, who had concluded that the neurotoxin oxalyldiaminopropionic acid (ODAP) in the wild potato seed was responsible for a degenerative disease known as lathyrism. In August 2013, Krakauer sent a modest sample of the seeds for testing, discovering that they contained ".394 per cent beta-ODAP by weight, a concentration well within the levels known to cause lathyrism in humans." Krakauer concludes that "Had McCandless's guidebook to edible plants warned that Hedysarum alpinum seeds contain a neurotoxin that can cause paralysis, he probably would have walked out of the wild in late August with no more difficulty than when he walked into the wild in April, and would still be alive today." Later, a more detailed mass spectrometric analysis showed, that the poison in Hedysarum alpinum is L-canavanine instead of ODAP.

== Wildlife ==
The roots are a major food for grizzly bears.

== Species ==
The following species are accepted by The Plant List:

- Hedysarum aculeatum Golosk.
- Hedysarum aculeolatum Boiss.
- Hedysarum acutifolium Bajtenov
- Hedysarum alaicum B.Fedtsch.
- Hedysarum algidum L.Z.Shue
- Hedysarum alpinum L.
- Hedysarum amankutanicum B.Fedtsch.
- Hedysarum angrenicum Korotkova
- Hedysarum argyreum Greuter & Burdet
- Hedysarum argyrophyllum Ledeb.
- Hedysarum armenum Boiss. & Tchich.
- Hedysarum astragaloides Benth.
- Hedysarum atropatanum Boiss.
- Hedysarum austrokurilense (N.S.Pavlova) N.S.Pavlova
- Hedysarum austrosibiricum B.Fedtsch.
- Hedysarum baicalense B.Fedtsch.
- Hedysarum balchanense Boriss.
- Hedysarum baldshuanicum B.Fedtsch.
- Hedysarum bectauatavicum Bajtenov
- Hedysarum bellevii (Prain) Bornm.
- Hedysarum biebersteinii Zertova
- Hedysarum bordzilovskyi Grossh.
- Hedysarum boreale Nutt.
- Hedysarum boutignyanum (A.Camus) Alleiz.
- Hedysarum boveanum Basiner
- Hedysarum brachypterum Bunge
- Hedysarum brahuicum Boiss.
- Hedysarum branthii Trautv. & C.A.Mey.
- Hedysarum bucharicum B.Fedtsch.
- Hedysarum cachemirianum Baker
- Hedysarum callithrix Boiss.
- Hedysarum campylocarpon H.Ohashi
- Hedysarum candidum M.Bieb.
- Hedysarum cappadocicum Boiss.
- Hedysarum carnosum Desf.
- Hedysarum caucasicum M.Bieb.
- Hedysarum chaitocarpum Regel & Schmalh.
- Hedysarum chaiyrakanicum Kurbatski
- Hedysarum chalchorum N.Ulziykh.
- Hedysarum chantavicum Bajtenov
- Hedysarum chinense (B.Fedtsch.) Hand.-Mazz.
- Hedysarum cisbaicalense Malyschev
- Hedysarum cisdarvasicum Kamelin
- Hedysarum citrinum Baker f.
- Hedysarum consanguineum DC.
- Hedysarum coronarium L.
- Hedysarum cretaceum DC.
- Hedysarum criniferum Boiss.
- Hedysarum cumuschtanicum Sultanova
- Hedysarum daghestanicum Boiss.
- Hedysarum dahuricum B.Fedtsch.
- Hedysarum damghanicum Rech.f.
- Hedysarum daraut-kurganicum Sultanova
- Hedysarum dasycarpum Turcz.
- Hedysarum dentatoalatum K.T.Fu
- Hedysarum denticulatum Regel & Schmalh.
- Hedysarum dmitrievae Bajtenov
- Hedysarum drobovii Korotkova
- Hedysarum dshambulicum Pavlov
- Hedysarum elbursense Bornm. & Gauba
- Hedysarum elegans Boiss. & A.Huet
- Hedysarum elymaiticum Boiss. & Hausskn.
- Hedysarum enaffae Sultanova
- Hedysarum falconeri Baker
- Hedysarum fallacinum Rech.f. & Aellen
- Hedysarum farinosum Parsa
- Hedysarum ferganense Korsh.
- Hedysarum fistulosum Hand.-Mazz.
- Hedysarum flavescens Regel & Schmalh.
- Hedysarum flavum Rupr.
- Hedysarum flexuosum L.
- Hedysarum formosum Basiner
- Hedysarum fruticosum Pall.
- Hedysarum gmelinii Ledeb.
- Hedysarum grandiflorum Pall.
- Hedysarum gypsaceum Korotkova
- Hedysarum halophilum Bornm. & Gauba
- Hedysarum hedysaroides (L.) Schinz & Thell.
- Hedysarum hemithamnoides Korotkova
- Hedysarum hyrcanum Bornm. & Gauba
- Hedysarum ibericum M.Bieb.
- Hedysarum iliense B.Fedtsch.
- Hedysarum inundatum Turcz.
- Hedysarum iomuticum B.Fedtsch.
- Hedysarum jaxarticum Popov
- Hedysarum jaxartucirdes Y. Liu ex R. Sa
- Hedysarum jinchuanense L.Z.Shue
- Hedysarum kamcziraki Karimova
- Hedysarum kamelinii N.Ulziykh.
- Hedysarum kandyktassicum Bajtenov
- Hedysarum karataviense B.Fedtsch.
- Hedysarum kasteki Bajtenov
- Hedysarum kemulariae Sachokia & Chinth.
- Hedysarum kirghisorum B.Fedtsch.
- Hedysarum kopetdaghi Boriss.
- Hedysarum korshinskyanum B.Fedtsch.
- Hedysarum kotschyi Boiss.
- Hedysarum krasnovii B.Fedtsch.
- Hedysarum krylovii Sumnev.
- Hedysarum kudrjaschevii Korotkova
- Hedysarum kuhitangi Boriss.
- Hedysarum kumaonense Baker
- Hedysarum langranii Liu, P. L. (2026)
- Hedysarum latibracteatum N.S.Pavlova
- Hedysarum lehmannianum Bunge
- Hedysarum leucanthum (Greene) Greene
- Hedysarum limitaneum Hand.-Mazz.
- Hedysarum linczevskyi Bajtenov
- Hedysarum lipskianum L.I.Vassiljeva
- Hedysarum lipskyi B.Fedtsch.
- Hedysarum longigynophorum C.C.Ni
- Hedysarum macedonicum Bornm.
- Hedysarum mackenzii Richardson
- Hedysarum macranthum Freyn & Sint.
- Hedysarum macrocarpum Korotkova
- Hedysarum magnificum Kudr.
- Hedysarum mahrense Rech.f.
- Hedysarum maitlandianum Aitch. & Baker
- Hedysarum manaslense (Kitam.) H.Ohashi
- Hedysarum membranaceum Coss. & Balansa
- Hedysarum microcalyx Baker
- Hedysarum micropterum Boiss.
- Hedysarum mindshilkense Bajtenov
- Hedysarum minjanense Rech.f.
- Hedysarum minussinense B.Fedtsch.
- Hedysarum mogianicum (B.Fedtsch.) B.Fedtsch.
- Hedysarum monophyllum Boriss.
- Hedysarum montanum (B.Fedtsch.) B.Fedtsch.
- Hedysarum multijugum Maxim.
- Hedysarum nagarzense C.C.Ni
- Hedysarum narynense Nikitina
- Hedysarum naudinianum Coss. & Durieu
- Hedysarum neglectum Ledeb.
- Hedysarum nikolai Kovalevsk.
- Hedysarum nonnae Roskov
- Hedysarum nuratense Popov
- Hedysarum occidentale Greene
- Hedysarum olgae B.Fedtsch.
- Hedysarum omissum Korotkova ex Kovalevsk.
- Hedysarum ovczinnikovii Karimova
- Hedysarum pallidiflorum Pavlov
- Hedysarum pallidum Desf.
- Hedysarum papillosum Boiss.
- Hedysarum parviflorum Bajtenov
- Hedysarum parvum Sultanova
- Hedysarum pavlovii Bajtenov
- Hedysarum perrauderianum Coss. & Durieu
- Hedysarum petrovii Yakovlev
- Hedysarum plumosum Boiss. & Hausskn.
- Hedysarum polybotrys Hand.-Mazz.
- Hedysarum popovii Korotkova
- Hedysarum praticolum Rech.f.
- Hedysarum pseudastragalus Ulbr.
- Hedysarum pseudomicrocalyx H.Ohashi & Tateishi
- Hedysarum pskemense B.Fedtsch.
- Hedysarum pulchrum Nikitina
- Hedysarum razoumovianum DC.
- Hedysarum renzii Rech.f.
- Hedysarum roseum Sims
- Hedysarum sachalinense B.Fedtsch.
- Hedysarum sajanicum N.Ulziykh.
- Hedysarum sangilense Krasnob. & Timokhina
- Hedysarum santalaschi B.Fedtsch.
- Hedysarum sauzakense Rech.f.
- Hedysarum schischkinii Sumnev.
- Hedysarum scoparium Fisch. & C.A.Mey.
- Hedysarum semenovii Regel & Herder
- Hedysarum sericatum Kitam.
- Hedysarum sericeum M.Bieb.
- Hedysarum setigerum Fisch. & C.A.Mey.
- Hedysarum setosum Vved.
- Hedysarum severzovii Bunge
- Hedysarum sikkimense Baker
- Hedysarum singarense Boiss. & Hausskn.
- Hedysarum songoricum Bong.
- Hedysarum spinosissimum L.
- Hedysarum splendens DC.
- Hedysarum subglabrum (Kar. & Kir.) B.Fedtsch.
- Hedysarum sulphurescens Rydb.
- Hedysarum taipeicum (Hand.-Mazz.) K.T.Fu
- Hedysarum talassicum Nikitina & Sultanova
- Hedysarum tanguticum B.Fedtsch.
- Hedysarum taschkendicum Popov
- Hedysarum tauricum Willd.
- Hedysarum tenuifolium (B.Fedtsch.) B.Fedtsch.
- Hedysarum theinum Krasnob.
- Hedysarum thiochroum Hand.-Mazz.
- Hedysarum tibeticum (Benth.) B.H. Choi & H. Ohashi
- Hedysarum trigonomerum Hand.-Mazz.
- Hedysarum truncatum Eastw.
- Hedysarum turczaninovii Peschkova
- Hedysarum turkestanicum Regel & Schmalh.
- Hedysarum turkewiczii B.Fedtsch.
- Hedysarum ucrainicum Kaschm.
- Hedysarum varium Willd.
- Hedysarum vicioides Turcz.
- Hedysarum volkii Rech.f.
- Hedysarum vvedenskyi Korotkova
- Hedysarum wakhanicum Podlech & Anderson
- Hedysarum wrightianum Aitch. & Baker
- Hedysarum xizangensis C.C.Ni
- Hedysarum zundukii Peschkova
