= Guastedda dolce nissena =

Italian sweet

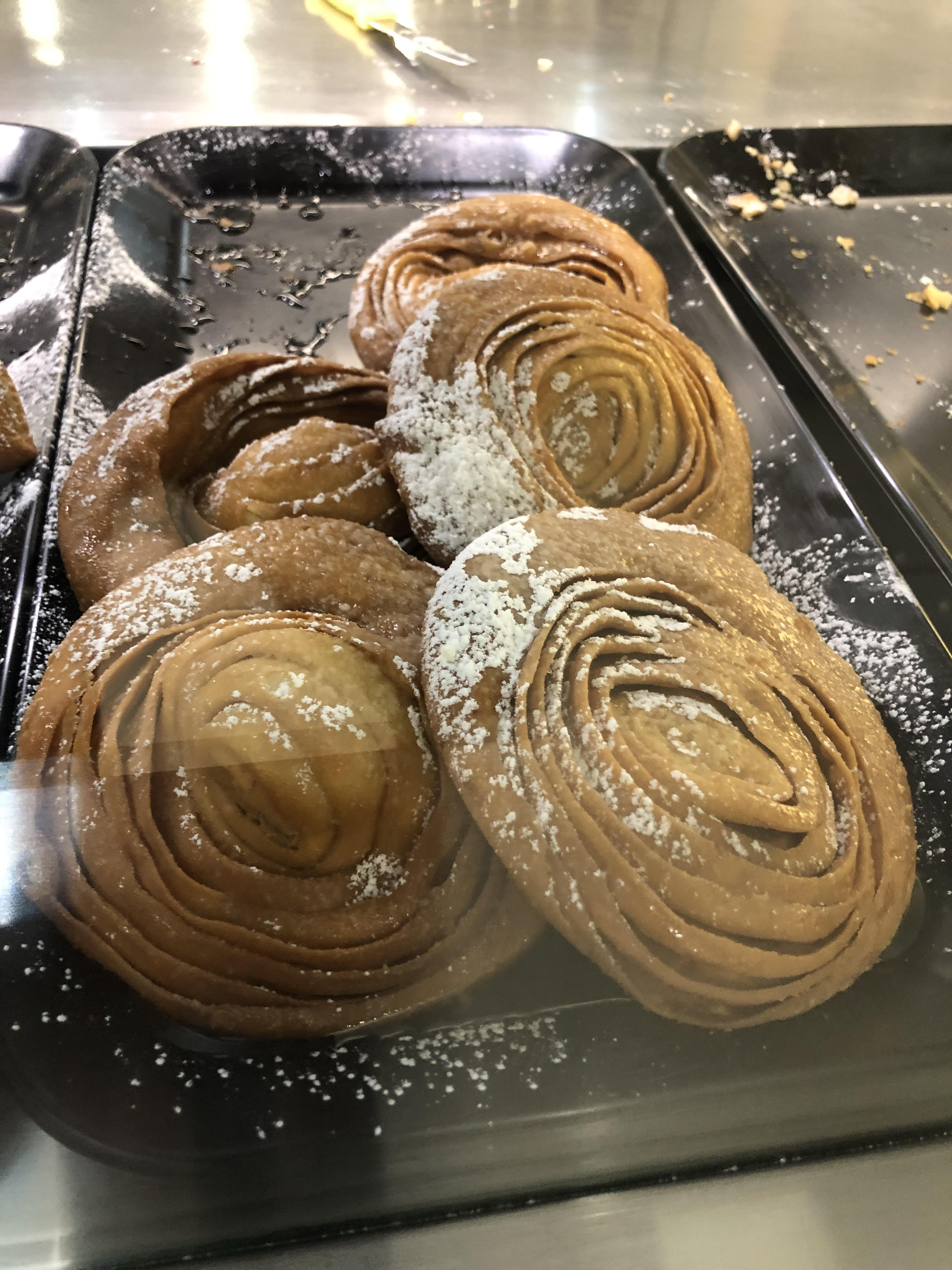
- Guastedde in a shop window
- Alternative names: Guastedda
- Type: Sweet
- Place of origin: Italy
- Region or state: Caltanissetta, Sicily

Guastedda dolce nissena or guastedda is a dessert from the city of Caltanissetta, Sicily.

Guastedda dolce nissena with the ricotta filling becomes raviola di ricotta nissena. This dessert is the base of the raviola di ricotta nissena, without having the ricotta filling.

Guastedda dolce nissena in Sicily are produced in many sweet and non-sweet variations, the nissena one however is a unicum typical of the city of Caltanissetta.

== Ingredients ==
Soft wheat flour typically from majorca wheat, honey typically from Sulla coronaria and strictly lard as a fat for frying.

Guastedda dolce nissena normally has the diameter of the side of the raviola di ricotta nissena, being the disk that is folded on itself after the ricotta filling has been placed in the raviola di ricotta nissena. For its production it is strictly necessary to use lard as a frying fat. Once cooked, the dessert is brushed with melted honey similarly to the raviola di ricotta nissena.

== See also ==
Media related to Guasteddra at Wikimedia Commons

- List of Italian desserts and pastries
