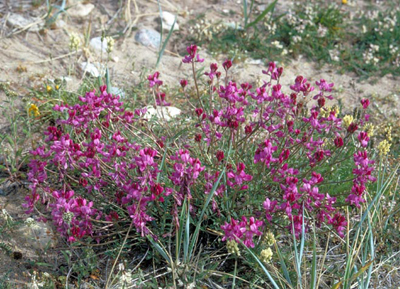

Scientific classification
- Kingdom: Plantae
- Clade: Tracheophytes
- Clade: Angiosperms
- Clade: Eudicots
- Clade: Rosids
- Order: Fabales
- Family: Fabaceae
- Subfamily: Faboideae
- Genus: Hedysarum
- Species: H. alpinum

Binomial name
- Hedysarum alpinum L.

= Hedysarum alpinum =

Species of legume

Hedysarum alpinum is a species of flowering plant in the legume family known by the common name alpine sweetvetch, bear root, or eskimo potato. It is called masu, mashu, masru or mazu in the Iñupiaq language, and as food aigak, meaning edible root. It has a circumpolar distribution, occurring throughout the northern latitudes of the Northern Hemisphere. In North America it is widespread in Canada and the northernmost United States, including Alaska.

== Description ==
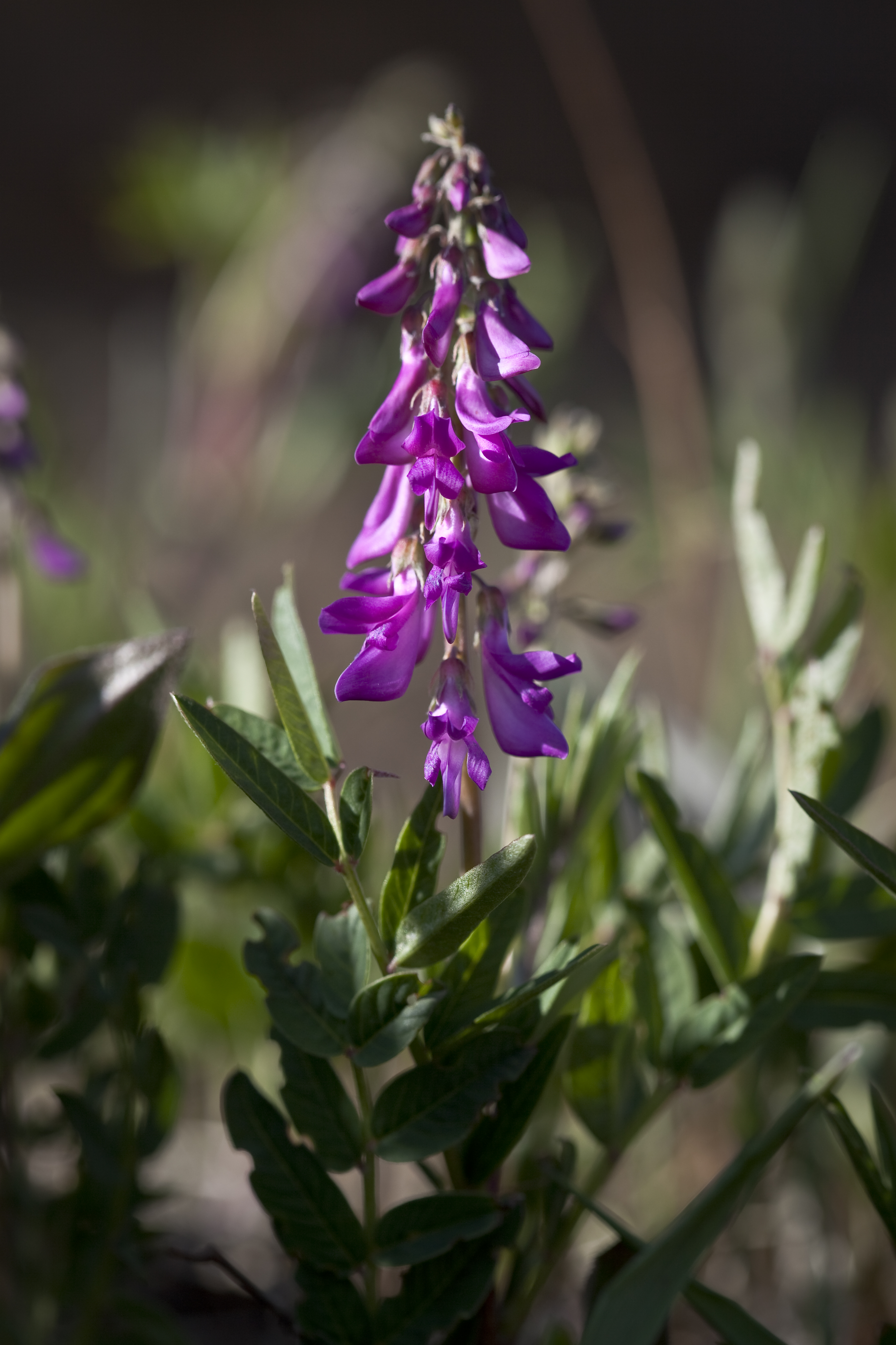
Hedysarum alpinum flower

This plant is a perennial herb producing several erect stems from its caudex. It grows to 70 centimetres (28 inches) in height. The taproot is thick and woody, and it has rhizomes which can produce new stems. The leaves are each divided into a number of leaflets up to 3.5 centimetres (1.4 inches) long. The inflorescence is a dense raceme of flowers. The flowers are pink or pale purple and up to 1.5 centimetres (0.59 inches) long. The flowers are pollinated by insects such as the bumblebee and honeybee. The fruit is a flat legume pod which is narrowed between the seeds, with as many as 9 segments.

== Distribution and habitat ==
This plant generally grows in the boreal and northern temperate climates. It occurs in tundra and taiga habitat types, in floodplains, grasslands, and dry forests. It is well adapted to calcareous soils. It is usually not a dominant species but it is considered dominant in several river deltas and plains in Alaska. It is a pioneer species on floodplains that have been recently scoured by water and ice. It grows with willows and birches along waterways and in forests dominated by spruces. It grows on grasslands with grass species such as little bluestem (Schizachyrium scoparium), Canada bluegrass (Poa compressa), and American dunegrass (Leymus mollis).

== Ecology ==
Alpine sweetvetch is an important source of food for many types of animals, including black bears, grizzly bears, American bison, moose, Dall's sheep, and caribou. Bears are adept at digging up the nutritious roots, and patches of exposed dirt may be found around where the plants grow. The roots are a primary food for grizzly bears in some areas, such as Banff National Park. In parts of Alaska this plant is a primary food for Dall's sheep, caribou, and muskoxen. Many small mammals, such as voles and short-tailed weasels eat it, and a variety of birds nest in alpine sweetvetch habitat.

== Use by humans ==
Alaska Natives have traditionally and continue to use the plant for food, particularly the fleshy roots. The roots are said to taste somewhat like young carrots. The Inupiat people call the plant wild potato and obtain dietary fiber from the roots. Alpine sweetvetch is the most important food source for the Dena'ina people after wild fruit species. The Eskimo train dogs to locate stores of roots that have been cached by mice. The roots may be eaten raw or prepared in a number of ways, including boiling, roasting, and frying in grease. They are stored in lard or oil and eaten when other food stores run out.

The plant is sometimes confused for its cousin Hedysarum boreale which is commonly referred to as toxic, though there is little to no scientific basis for this fact. Hedysarum alpinum has a longer floral stem and larger flowers, and dark veins on the back of the leaves, while the flowers of Hedysarum mackenzii are much smaller, and its leaves have a soft white fuzz.

The seeds should not be eaten raw, or in large quantity, as they contain L-canavanine, which may have led or contributed to the death of Christopher McCandless. Research into the veracity of this theory is ongoing.
