= Lactuca cyprica =

Conservation status
- Near Threatened (IUCN 3.1)

Scientific classification
- Kingdom: Plantae
- Clade: Tracheophytes
- Clade: Angiosperms
- Clade: Eudicots
- Clade: Asterids
- Order: Asterales
- Family: Asteraceae
- Genus: Lactuca
- Species: L. cyprica

Binomial name
- Lactuca cyprica (Rech.f.) N.Kilian & Greuter 2003

Synonyms
- Cephalorrhynchus cypricus Rech.f. 1951

Species of lettuce

Lactuca cypria, the Cyprus lettuce, is a biennial, erect herb with glandular, hairy stems and a globose rhizome. Leaves alternate, simple, the basal large, oblong, petiolate, 10-15 x 5–7 cm, pinnatisect with a suborbicular terminal lobe, the upper smaller, often with a profound purple colour at the lower surface. Flowers in heads, capitula in corymbs, florets pale yellow, all ligulate, flowers April–July, fruit a pappose achene.

== Habitat ==
In moist, shaded positions, by streams and moist hillsides among pines and riverine forest on igneous formations at 800–1950 m altitude.

== Distribution ==
Endemic to Cyprus where it is confined to the Troödos Mountains where it in some areas is fairly common: Tripylos, Stavros Psokas, Kryos Potamos, Troödos Forest, Khionistra.
