= H. coronarium =

H. coronarium may refer to:

- Hedysarum coronarium, the French honeysuckle or cock's head, a perennial herb species native to Northern Africa and Spain
- Hedychium coronarium, the white ginger lily, a plant species originally from the Himalayas region of Nepal and India

== See also ==
- Coronarium
