= Lawrey Gardens =

Urban park in Calgary, Alberta

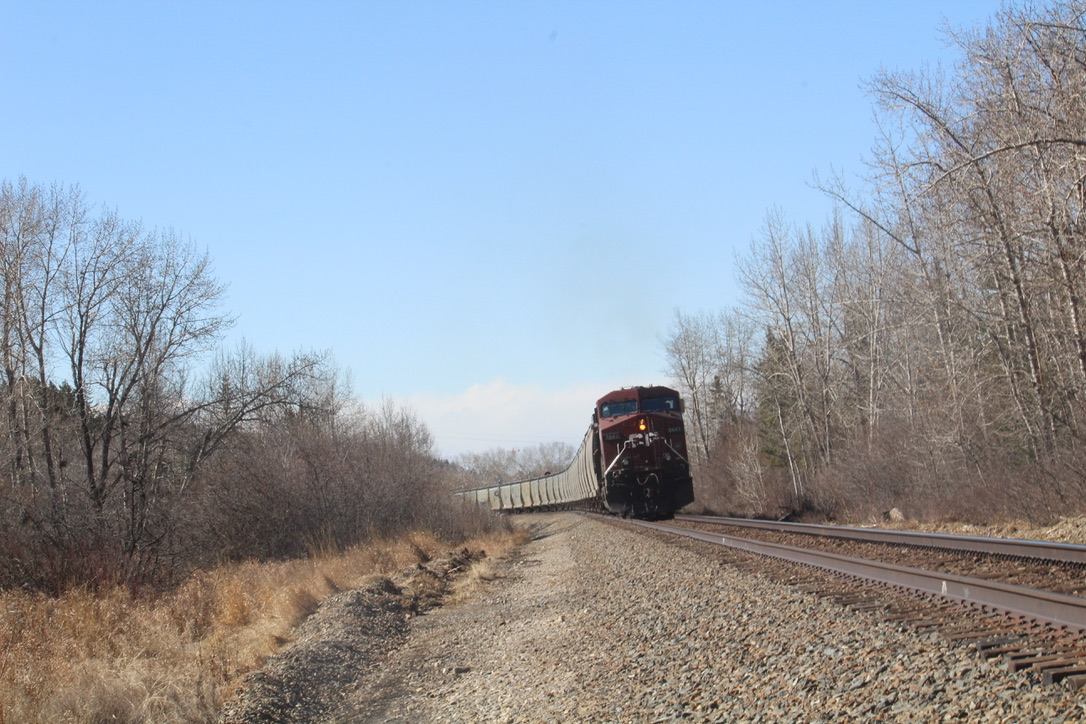
- Train passing through Lawrey Gardens
- Interactive map of Lawrey Gardens
- Type: Urban park
- Location: Calgary, Alberta, Canada
- Coordinates: 51°03′08″N 114°07′41″W
- Area: 16.5 hectares (41 acres)
- Created: 1960s
- Operator: City of Calgary
- Status: Open year round

Lawrey Gardens, erroneously known as Lowrey Gardens is an urban park in southwest Calgary, Alberta along the Bow River.

== Description ==
Lawrey Gardens is located on the southern bank of the Bow River just north of the Spruce Cliff neighbourhood. The Bow River pathway goes through the park connecting it with Edworthy Park in the west and Pumphouse Park to the east. In the west, the Douglas Fir Trail sits between it and the neighbourhood of Spruce Cliff, and in the eastern part of the park it borders the Shaganappi Point Golf Course and connects to Shaganappi Park by the Bow Trail Pedestrian Bridge. The Canadian Pacific Railway runs diagonally through the entirety of the park, with the Quarry Road Trail connecting with the Douglas Fir Trail to the south of the Railway and the Bow River pathway crossing Lawrey Gardens north of it.

== Facilities & activities ==
The park features no facilities, and is mostly undeveloped besides from trails. Activities in the park include dog-walking, fishing, birdwatching, and biking. The gravel banks in the park are popular places for picnics and sunbathing.

== History ==
The park is named after John Lawrey, who settled in the area in 1882 and established a market garden which supplied railway workers and settlers with fresh produce. He died in 1904, and his two nephews lived on the property up until World War I. The area of the park formerly hosted multiple now demolished buildings. In 1962 the area of the park was purchased by the city to be developed into a park.

== Ecology ==
The park hosts over 100 species of birds, with common species in the park including Sora, Cedar waxwing, Grey partridge, White-throated sparrow, Common merganser, Canada goose, Red-winged blackbird, Western wood-pewee, and White-breasted nuthatch. Other wlidlife in the park include White-tailed jackrabbit, Boreal chorus frog, Wood frog, Wandering garter snake, Rainbow trout, Satyr comma, and Mourning cloak. Plant species present in the park include Choke cherry, Canada violet, Starry false solomon's-seal, Tall bluebells, and Boreal sweet-vetch.

== See also ==
- List of attractions and landmarks in Calgary
- List of protected areas of Alberta
- List of parks in Calgary
