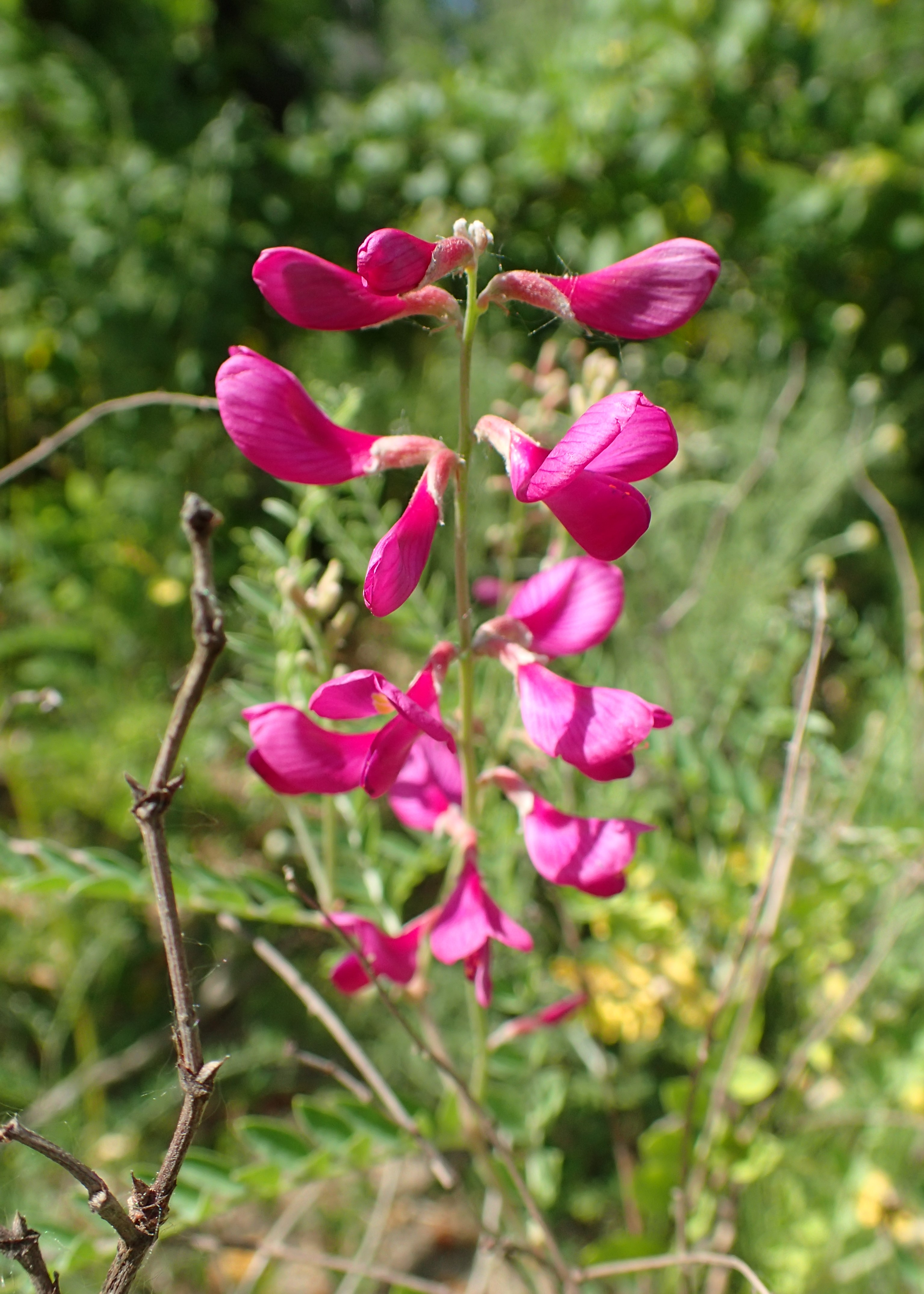
- Corethrodendron multijugum

Scientific classification
- Kingdom: Plantae
- Clade: Tracheophytes
- Clade: Angiosperms
- Clade: Eudicots
- Clade: Rosids
- Order: Fabales
- Family: Fabaceae
- Subfamily: Faboideae
- Tribe: Hedysareae
- Genus: Corethrodendron; Fisch. ex Bashiner

Synonyms
- Hedysarum sect. Fruticosa

= Corethrodendron =

Genus of legumes

Corethrodendron is a genus of flowering plants in the legume family, Fabaceae. It belongs to the subfamily Faboideae.
