= Werner Greuter =

Swiss botanist

Werner Rodolfo Greuter (born 27 February 1938 in Genoa, Italy, as a Swiss national) is a botanist. He was the chair of the Editorial Committee for the International Code of Botanical Nomenclature (ICBN) - the Tokyo Code (1994) and the St Louis Code (2000). His proposed policy as regards registration of botanical names proved unpopular and in 1999 he stepped back, not being elected anew: he completed his term as chair to be succeeded at Vienna in 2005. He returned as a member of the editorial committee, contributing to the renamed International Code of Nomenclature for algae, fungi, and plants, the "Melbourne Code" (2012).

== Biography ==
Greuter went to schools in Bellinzona and Winterthur, and received his PhD from the University of Zürich in 1972. From 1972 to 1974 he was scientific director of the Goulandris Museum of Natural History in Kifisia, Athens, and edited its journal, Annales Musei Goulandris till 1976, being succeeded by W. T. Stearn.

He was appointed on 1 April 1978 to his current position: Professor of biology in the Institute of Biology at the Free University of Berlin, Germany, and First Director of the University's Botanic Garden and Botanical Museum (BGBM) in Berlin.

== Awards ==
- Medal of Honour of the University of Crete, Rethymnon, 2010
- Doctorate honoris causa (Laurea specialistica ad honorem in Biologia ed Ecologia vegetale), Università degli Studi di Palermo, 2010
- Premio Acuña Galé, Sociedad Cubana de Botánica, 2009
- Honorary Professorship (Categoría Docente Especial de Profesor Invitado), Universidad de La Habana, 2004
- Theophrastus Medal of Honour of the Hellenic Botanical Society, 2000
- IAPT Distinguished Services Award, 1999
- OPTIMA Gold Medal, 1998.
- Distinguished Services Award, XVI International Botanical Congress, St Louis, Missouri

== Eponymy ==
The plant species Epipactis greuteri, Minuartia greuteriana, Hieracium greuteri, Centaurea greuteri, Bupleurum greuteri and Acanthus greuterianus are named after him. As well as Greuteria, which is a genus of flowering plants belonging to the family Fabaceae and published in 2013.

== See also ==
- binomial nomenclature
- List of botanists by author abbreviation

== References and external links ==
- Prof. Greuter's page at The Botanic Garden and Botanical Museum Berlin-Dahlem (BGBM)
- Example of a combination published by Greuter: Dittrichia viscosa (L.) Greuter
