= Chesneya elegans =

Scientific classification
- Kingdom: Plantae
- Clade: Tracheophytes
- Clade: Angiosperms
- Clade: Eudicots
- Clade: Rosids
- Order: Fabales
- Family: Fabaceae
- Subfamily: Faboideae
- Genus: Chesneya
- Species: C. elegans

Binomial name
- Chesneya elegans Fomin

Species of legume

Chesneya elegans is a flowering plant species in the genus Chesneya found in Turkey.
