= Tibetia (plant) =

Scientific classification
- Kingdom: Plantae
- Clade: Tracheophytes
- Clade: Angiosperms
- Clade: Eudicots
- Clade: Rosids
- Order: Fabales
- Family: Fabaceae
- Subfamily: Faboideae
- Tribe: Hedysareae
- Genus: Tibetia (Ali) H.P.Tsui (1979)

Species
- Tibetia coelestis (N.D.Simpson) H.P.Tsui; Tibetia forrestii (Ali) P.C.Li; Tibetia himalaica (Baker) H.P.Tsui; Tibetia tongolensis (Ulbr.) H.P.Tsui; Tibetia yadongensis H.P.Tsui; Tibetia yunnanensis (Franch.) H.P.Tsui

Genus of plants

Tibetia is a genus of plants in the legume family, Fabaceae. It includes six species of herbs native to the Himalayas, Tibet, Qinghai, and central China. Typical habitats include continental, montane, and altimontane grassland.
