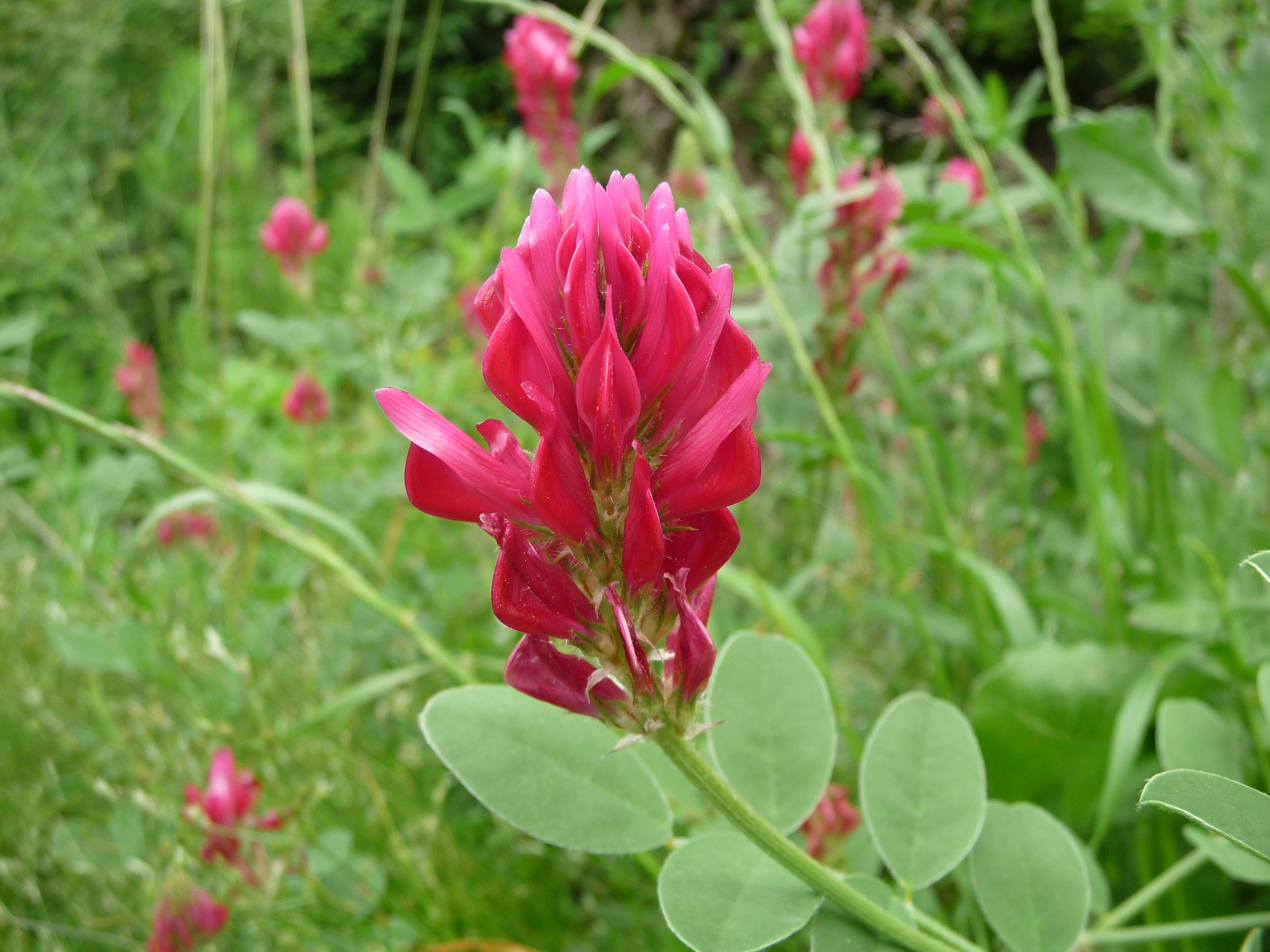
- Sulla coronaria in Italy

Scientific classification
- Kingdom: Plantae
- Clade: Tracheophytes
- Clade: Angiosperms
- Clade: Eudicots
- Clade: Rosids
- Order: Fabales
- Family: Fabaceae
- Subfamily: Faboideae
- Tribe: Hedysareae
- Genus: Sulla; Medik.

Type species
- Sulla coronaria (L.) Medik.

Species
- See text.

Synonyms
- Hedysarum sect. Eleutherotion Basiner; Hedysarum sect. Hedysarum Chrtkova; Hedysarum sect. Spinosissima B.Fedtsch.

= Sulla (plant) =

Genus of legumes

Sulla is a genus of flowering plants in the legume family, Fabaceae. It includes eight species of annual herbs native to the Mediterranean Basin, including southern Europe, North Africa, and western Asia. They grow in dry Mediterranean-climate shrubland, bushland, thicket, and grassland and in semi-desert. The genus belongs to subfamily Faboideae.

== Species ==
Sulla comprises the following species:

- Sulla aculeolata (Munby ex Boiss.) Amirahm. & Kaz.Osaloo
- Sulla carnosa (Desf.) B.H.Choi & H.Ohashi
- Sulla coronaria (L.) Medik.
- Sulla flexuosa (L.) Medik.
- Sulla glomerata (F.Dietr.) B.H.Choi & H.Ohashi
- Sulla pallida (Desf.) B.H.Choi & H.Ohashi
- Sulla spinosissima (L.) B.H.Choi & H.Ohashi
  - subsp. capitatum
  - subsp. spinosissimum (L.) B.H.Choi & H.Ohashi
