= Eversmannia sarytavica =

Scientific classification
- Kingdom: Plantae
- Clade: Tracheophytes
- Clade: Angiosperms
- Clade: Eudicots
- Clade: Rosids
- Order: Fabales
- Family: Fabaceae
- Subfamily: Faboideae
- Genus: Eversmannia
- Species: E. sarytavica

Binomial name
- Eversmannia sarytavica Sarkisova

Species of plant

Eversmannia sarytavica is a plant in the genus Eversmannia that is native to Tajikistan and Kyrgyzstan.
