= Eversmannia =

Scientific classification
- Kingdom: Plantae
- Clade: Tracheophytes
- Clade: Angiosperms
- Clade: Eudicots
- Clade: Rosids
- Order: Fabales
- Family: Fabaceae
- Subfamily: Faboideae
- Tribe: Hedysareae
- Genus: Eversmannia; Bunge (1838)

Species
- Eversmannia botschantzevii Sarkisova; Eversmannia sarytavica Sarkisova; Eversmannia sogdiana Ovcz.; Eversmannia subspinosa (Fisch. ex DC.) B.Fedtsch.

Genus of legumes

Eversmannia is a genus of flowering plants in the legume family, Fabaceae. It belongs to subfamily Faboideae. It includes four species native to temperate Eurasia, ranging from southern European Russia and the Caucasus through Central Asia to Xinjiang, Afghanistan, and Iran.
