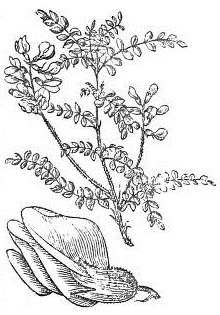
- Calophaca wolgarica

Scientific classification
- Kingdom: Plantae
- Clade: Tracheophytes
- Clade: Angiosperms
- Clade: Eudicots
- Clade: Rosids
- Order: Fabales
- Family: Fabaceae
- Subfamily: Faboideae
- Tribe: Hedysareae
- Genus: Calophaca; Fisch. (1812)

Species
- 9; see text

= Calophaca =

Genus of legumes

Calophaca is a genus of flowering plants in the legume family, Fabaceae. It includes nine species, which range from Ukraine through southern Russia and Central Asia to Xinjiang and Pakistan. It belongs to the subfamily Faboideae and is closely related to the genus Caragana. Nine species are accepted:

- Calophaca chinensis Boriss.
- Calophaca grandiflora Regel
- Calophaca pskemica Gorbunova
- Calophaca reticulata Sumnev.
- Calophaca sericea B.Fedtsch. ex Boriss.
- Calophaca soongorica Kar. & Kir.
- Calophaca tianschanica (B.Fedtsch.) Boriss.
- Calophaca tomentosa Blatt. & Hallb.
- Calophaca wolgarica (L.f.) Pall. ex Fisch.

Caragana lidou, formerly known as Calophaca sinica, was economically profitable historically, but as an effect of overexploitation is becoming less profitable.
