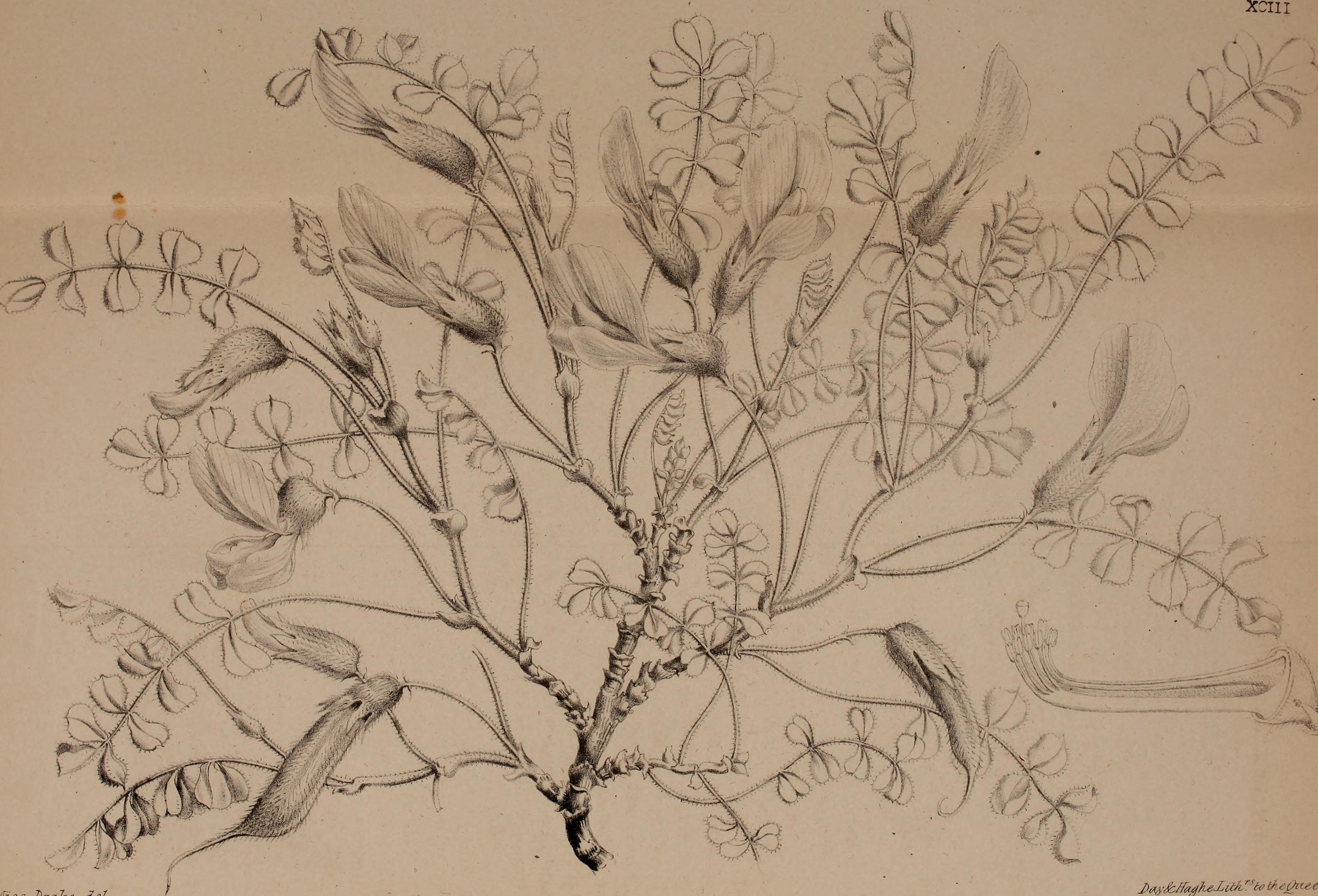
- Chesnaya rytidosperma

Scientific classification
- Kingdom: Plantae
- Clade: Tracheophytes
- Clade: Angiosperms
- Clade: Eudicots
- Clade: Rosids
- Order: Fabales
- Family: Fabaceae
- Subfamily: Faboideae
- Tribe: Hedysareae
- Genus: Chesneya; Lindl. ex Endl. (1840)

Species
- 47; see text

Synonyms
- Chesniella Boriss. (1964); Kostyczewa Korsh. (1896 publ. 1897); Spongiocarpella Yakovlev & N.Ulziykh. (1987)

= Chesneya =

Genus of legumes

Chesneya is a genus of flowering plants in the family Fabaceae. It includes 47 species which range across temperate Asia, from Turkey through Syria, Iraq, Iran, Central Asia, and the Himalayas to Inner Mongolia, central China, and Myanmar. It belongs to the subfamily Faboideae.

== Species ==
47 species are accepted:

- Chesneya acaulis (Baker) Popov
- Chesneya afghanica Rech.f. & Köie
- Chesneya antoninae Rassulova & B.A.Sharipova
- Chesneya astragalina Jaub. & Spach
- Chesneya badachschanica Boriss.
- Chesneya borissovii Pavlov
- Chesneya botschantzevii R.M.Vinogr.
- Chesneya crassipes Boriss.
- Chesneya cuneata (Benth.) Ali
- Chesneya darvasica Boriss.
- Chesneya depressa (Oliv.) Popov
- Chesneya dshungarica Golosk.
- Chesneya elegans Fomine
- Chesneya ferganensis Korsh.
- Chesneya gracilis (Boriss.) Kamelin
- Chesneya hissarica Boriss.
- Chesneya intermedia (Yakovlev) Z.G.Qian
- Chesneya isfarensis Turak.
- Chesneya karatavica Kamelin
- Chesneya kopetdaghensis Boriss.
- Chesneya kotschyi Boiss.
- Chesneya kschtutica Rassulova & B.A.Sharipova
- Chesneya latefoliolatus Rassulova & B.A.Sharipova
- Chesneya linczevskii Boriss.
- Chesneya macrantha W.C.Cheng ex H.C.Fu
- Chesneya mongolica Maxim.
- Chesneya neplii Boriss.
- Chesneya nikitinae Lazkov
- Chesneya nubigena (D.Don) Ali
- Chesneya parviflora Jaub. & Spach
- Chesneya paucifoliolata (Yakovlev) Z.G.Qian
- Chesneya pavlovii Kamelin & Gubanov
- Chesneya polystichoides (Hand.-Mazz.) Ali
- Chesneya popovii Kamelin & Yakovlev
- Chesneya purpurea P.C.Li
- Chesneya quinata Fed.
- Chesneya rytidosperma Jaub. & Spach
- Chesneya staintonii Kamelin & Yakovlev
- Chesneya tadzhikistana Boriss.
- Chesneya ternata (Korsh.) Popov
- Chesneya tribuloides Nevski
- Chesneya trijuga Boriss.
- Chesneya turkestanica Franch.
- Chesneya vaginalis Jaub. & Spach
- Chesneya villosa (Boriss.) Kamelin & R.M.Vinogr.
- Chesneya volkii Rech.f.
- Chesneya yunnanensis (Yakovlev) Z.G.Qian
