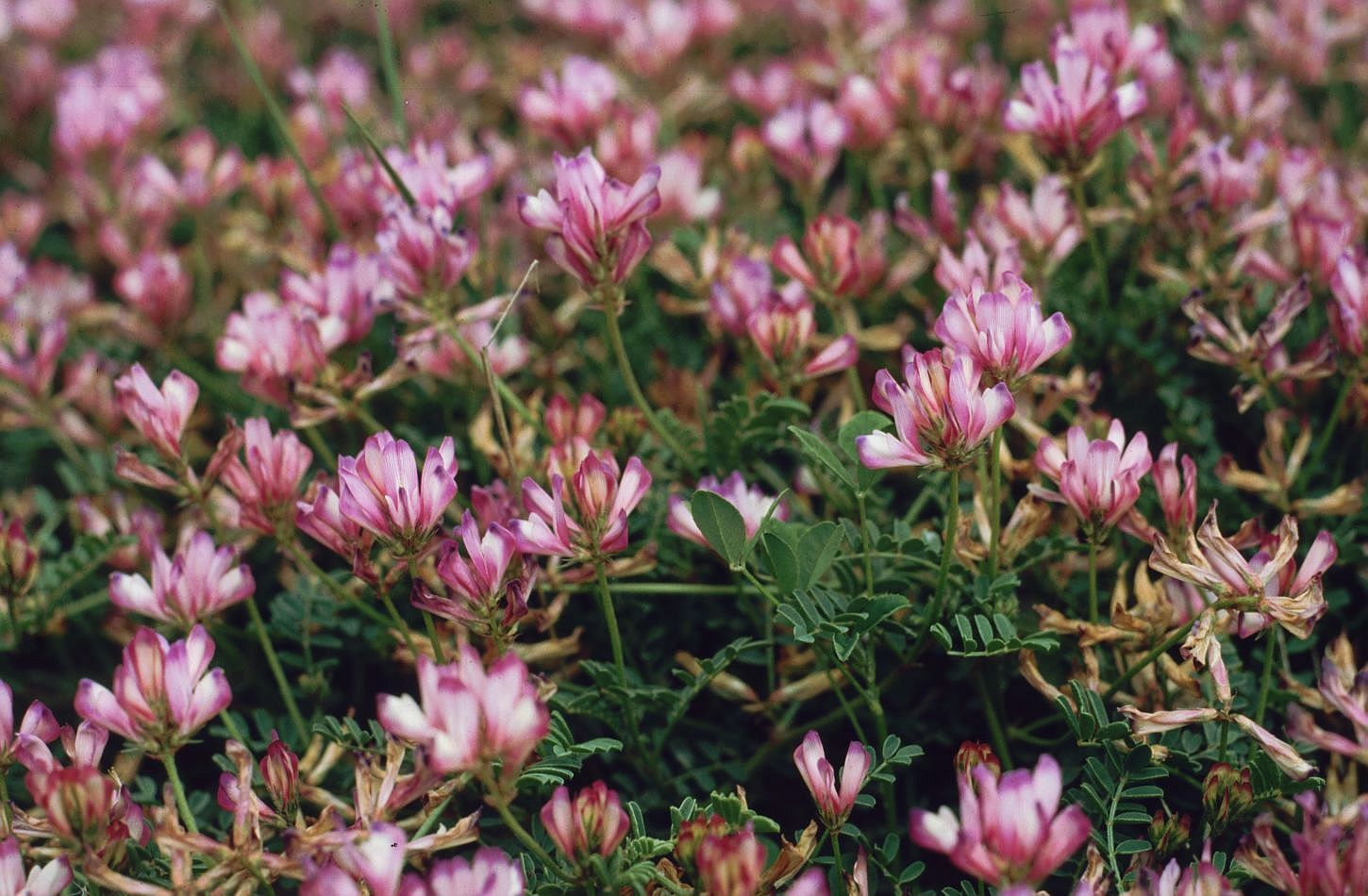

Scientific classification
- Kingdom: Plantae
- Clade: Tracheophytes
- Clade: Angiosperms
- Clade: Eudicots
- Clade: Rosids
- Order: Fabales
- Family: Fabaceae
- Subfamily: Faboideae
- Genus: Hedysarum
- Species: H. spinosissimum

Binomial name
- Hedysarum spinosissimum L.

Synonyms
- Hedysarum pallens

= Hedysarum spinosissimum =

Species of plant

Hedysarum spinosissimum is a species of annual herb in the family Fabaceae. They have a self-supporting growth form and compound, broad leaves. Individuals can grow to 22 cm tall.

== Sources ==
This article incorporates text from a free content work. Licensed under CC0 (license statement/permission). Text taken from Hedysarum spinosissimum. Encyclopedia of Life.
