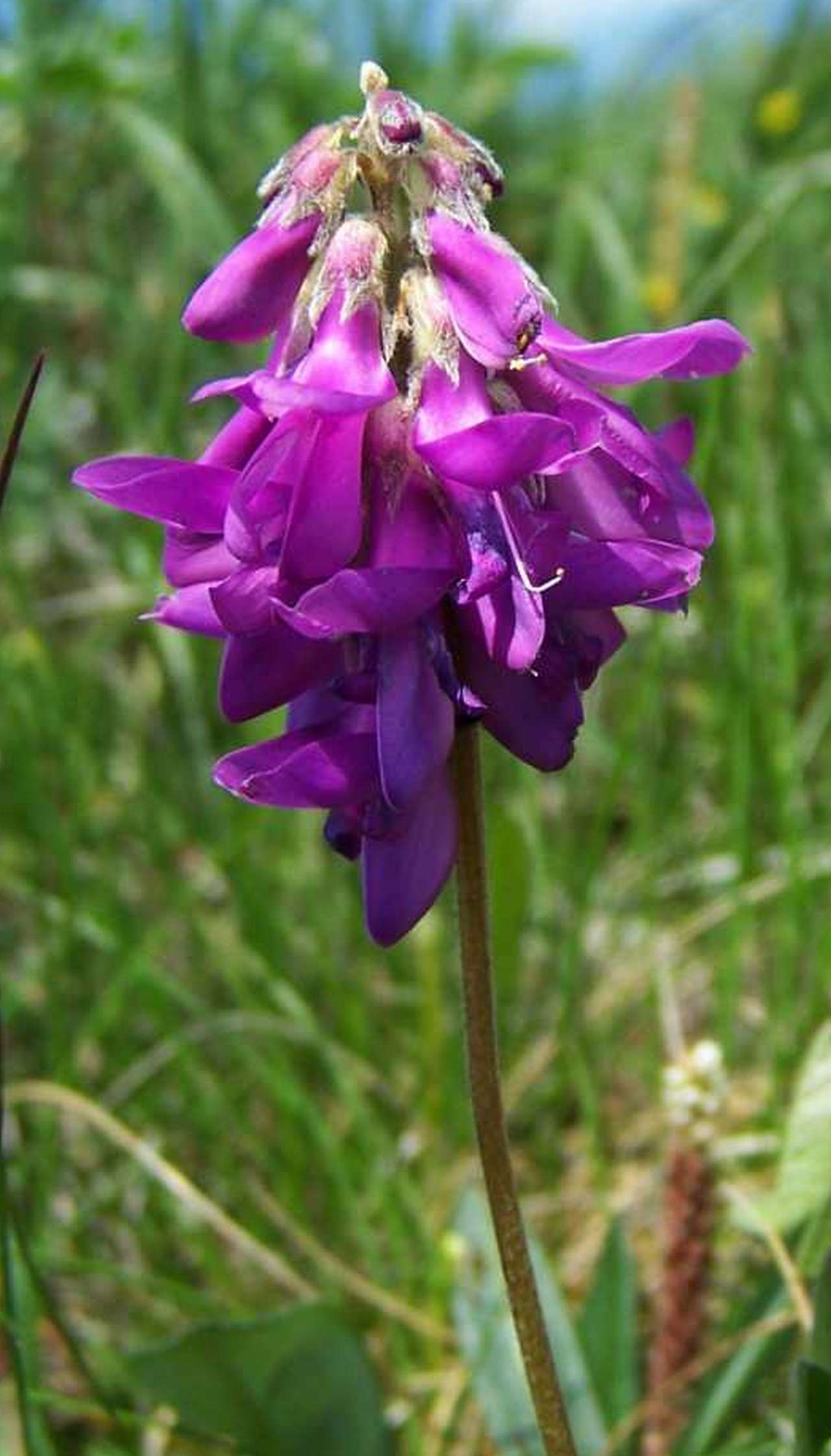
- Hedysarum hedysaroides

Scientific classification
- Kingdom: Plantae
- Clade: Tracheophytes
- Clade: Angiosperms
- Clade: Eudicots
- Clade: Rosids
- Order: Fabales
- Family: Fabaceae
- Subfamily: Faboideae
- Clade: Meso-Papilionoideae
- Clade: Non-protein amino acid-accumulating clade
- Clade: Hologalegina
- Clade: Inverted repeat-lacking clade
- Tribe: Hedysareae; DC.

Genera
- See text

= Hedysareae =

Tribe of legumes

Hedysareae is a tribe of plants in the subfamily Faboideae. Hedysareae species have loments, a type of modified legume that breaks apart at constrictions occurring between the segments of the seeds.

== Genera ==
The tribe consists of the following genera:

=== Caraganean clade ===
- Calophaca Fisch. ex DC.
- Caragana Fabr.
- Halimodendron Fisch. ex DC.

=== Chesneyean clade ===
- Chesneya Lindl. ex Endl.
- Gueldenstaedtia Fisch.
- Spongiocarpella Yakovlev & N. Ulziykh.
- Tibetia (Ali) H. P. Tsui

=== Hedysaroid clade ===
- Alhagi Gagnebin
- Corethrodendron Fisch. ex Bashiner
- Ebenus L.
- Eversmannia Bunge
- Greuteria Amirahmadi & Kaz. Osaloo.
- Hedysarum L.
- Onobrychis Mill.
- Sartoria Boiss. & Heldr.
- Sulla Medik.
- Taverniera DC.

== Systematics ==
Molecular phylogenetics have uncovered the following relationships:

- - Astragaleae (outgroup)
  - Hedysareae
    - Chesneyan Clade
      - - Tibetia
        - Gueldenstaedtia
      - - Chesneya
        - Spongiocarpella
    - - Caraganean Clade
        - Caragana
        - - Calophaca
          - Halimodendron
      - Hedysaroid Clade
        - Alhagi
        - - Sulla
          - - Ebenus
            - - - Taverniera
                - - Sartoria
                  - Hedysarum sensu stricto
              - CEGO Clade
                - - - Corethrodendron
                    - Eversmannia
                  - Greuteria
                - Onobrychis
