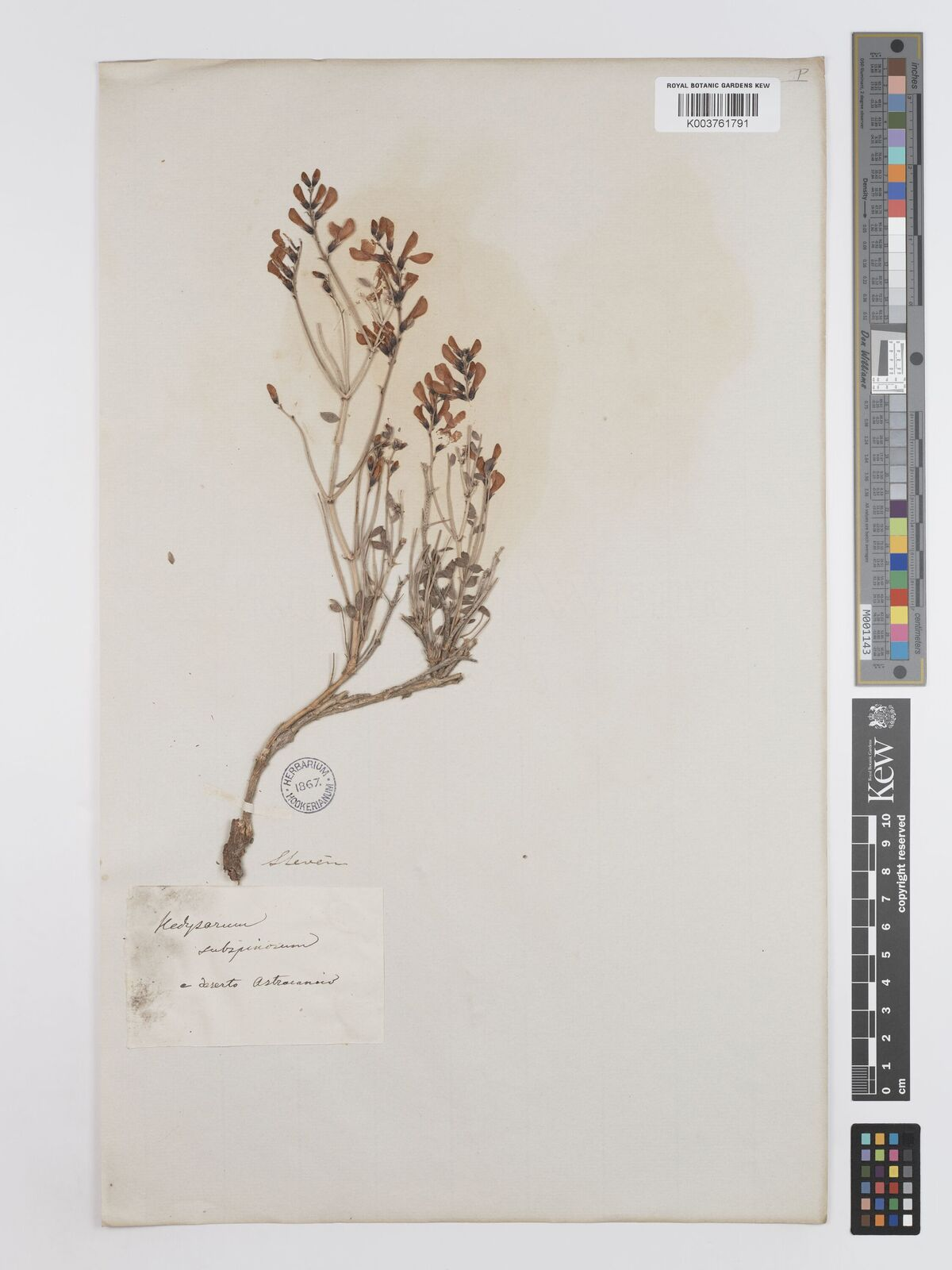

Scientific classification
- Kingdom: Plantae
- Clade: Tracheophytes
- Clade: Angiosperms
- Clade: Eudicots
- Clade: Rosids
- Order: Fabales
- Family: Fabaceae
- Subfamily: Faboideae
- Genus: Eversmannia
- Species: E. subspinosa

Binomial name
- Eversmannia subspinosa (Fisch. ex DC.) B.Fedtsch.

= Eversmannia subspinosa =

Species of plant

Eversmannia subspinosa is a flowering plant in the genus Eversmannia that is native to Afghanistan, Iran, Kazakhstan, Kyrgyzstan, Russia, Transcaucasus, and Xinjiang.
