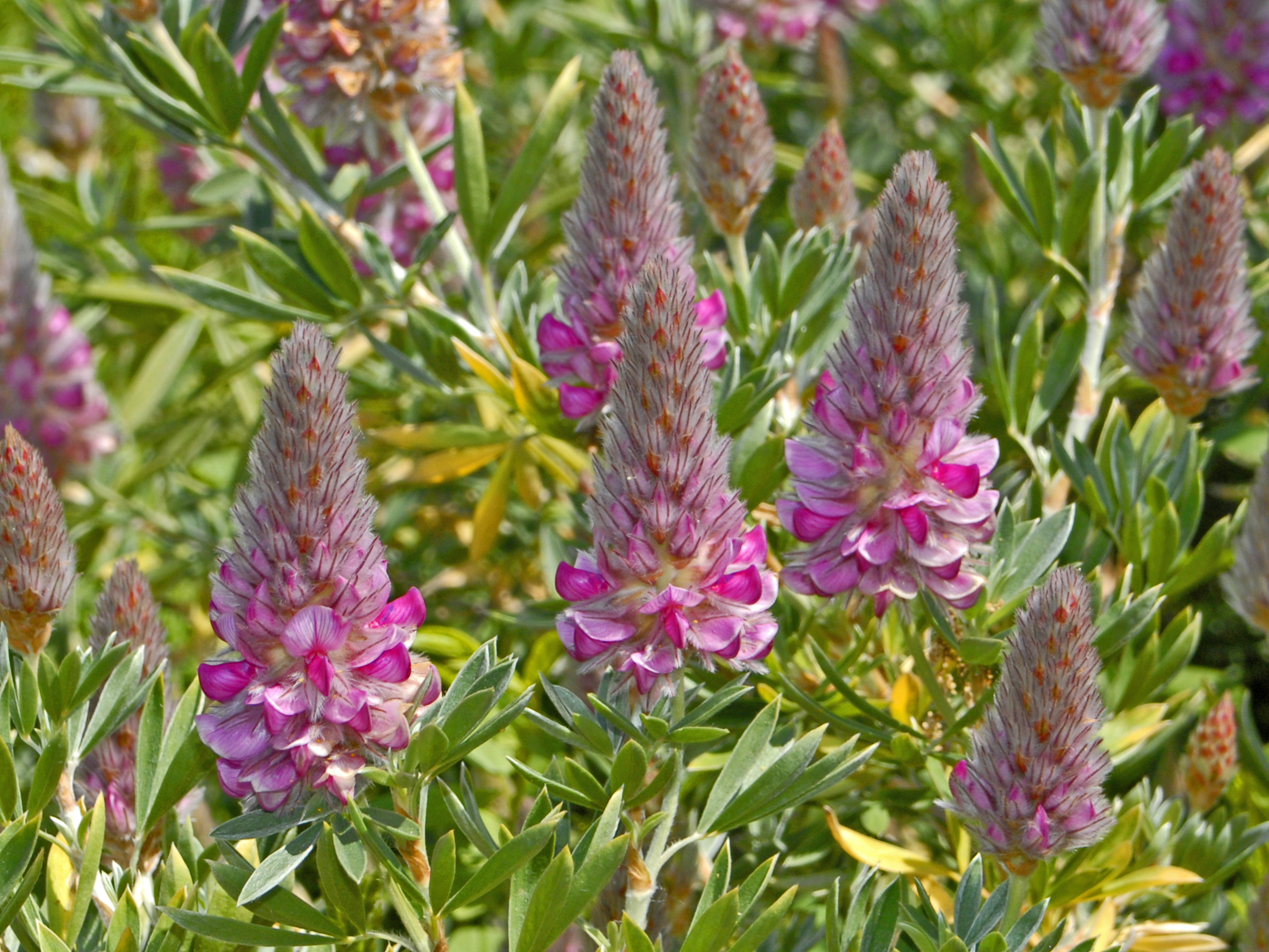
- Flowers of Ebenus cretica at the Jardin des Plantes, Paris

Scientific classification
- Kingdom: Plantae
- Clade: Tracheophytes
- Clade: Angiosperms
- Clade: Eudicots
- Clade: Rosids
- Order: Fabales
- Family: Fabaceae
- Subfamily: Faboideae
- Tribe: Hedysareae
- Genus: Ebenus; L. (1753)

Species
- 21; see text

Synonyms
- Ebenidium Jaub. & Spach (1843), nom. illeg.

= Ebenus =

Genus of legumes

Ebenus is a genus of flowering plants in the family Fabaceae. It belongs to the subfamily Faboideae. It includes 21 species native to northern Africa (Morocco to Egypt), Greece and Turkey, and Iran to the western Himalayas.

== Species ==
- Ebenus argentea Siehe ex Bornm.
- Ebenus armitagei Schweinf. & Taub.
- Ebenus barbigera Boiss.
- Ebenus boissieri Barbey
- Ebenus bourgaei Boiss.
- Ebenus cappadocica Hausskn. & Siehe ex Bornm.
- Ebenus cretica L.
- Ebenus depressa Boiss. & Balansa
- Ebenus haussknechtii Bornm. ex Hub.-Mor.
- Ebenus hirsuta Jaub. & Spach
- Ebenus lagopus Boiss.
- Ebenus laguroides Boiss.
- Ebenus longipes Boiss. & Balansa
- Ebenus macrophylla Jaub. & Spach
- Ebenus pinnata Aiton
- Ebenus pisidica Hub.-Mor. & Reese
- Ebenus plumosa Boiss. & Balansa
- Ebenus reesei Hub.-Mor.
- Ebenus sibthorpii DC.
- Ebenus stellata Boiss.
- Ebenus zekiyeae Aytaç & Yildirim
