= Hedysarum zundukii =

Scientific classification
- Kingdom: Plantae
- Clade: Embryophytes
- Clade: Tracheophytes
- Clade: Angiosperms
- Clade: Eudicots
- Clade: Rosids
- Order: Fabales
- Family: Fabaceae
- Subfamily: Faboideae
- Genus: Hedysarum
- Species: H. zundukii

Binomial name
- Hedysarum zundukii Peschkova

Species of flowering plant

Hedysarum zundukii is a species of flowering plant in the family Fabaceae, native to Irkutsk Oblast in Russia. A cushion-former, it is found only on the western shore of Lake Baikal.
