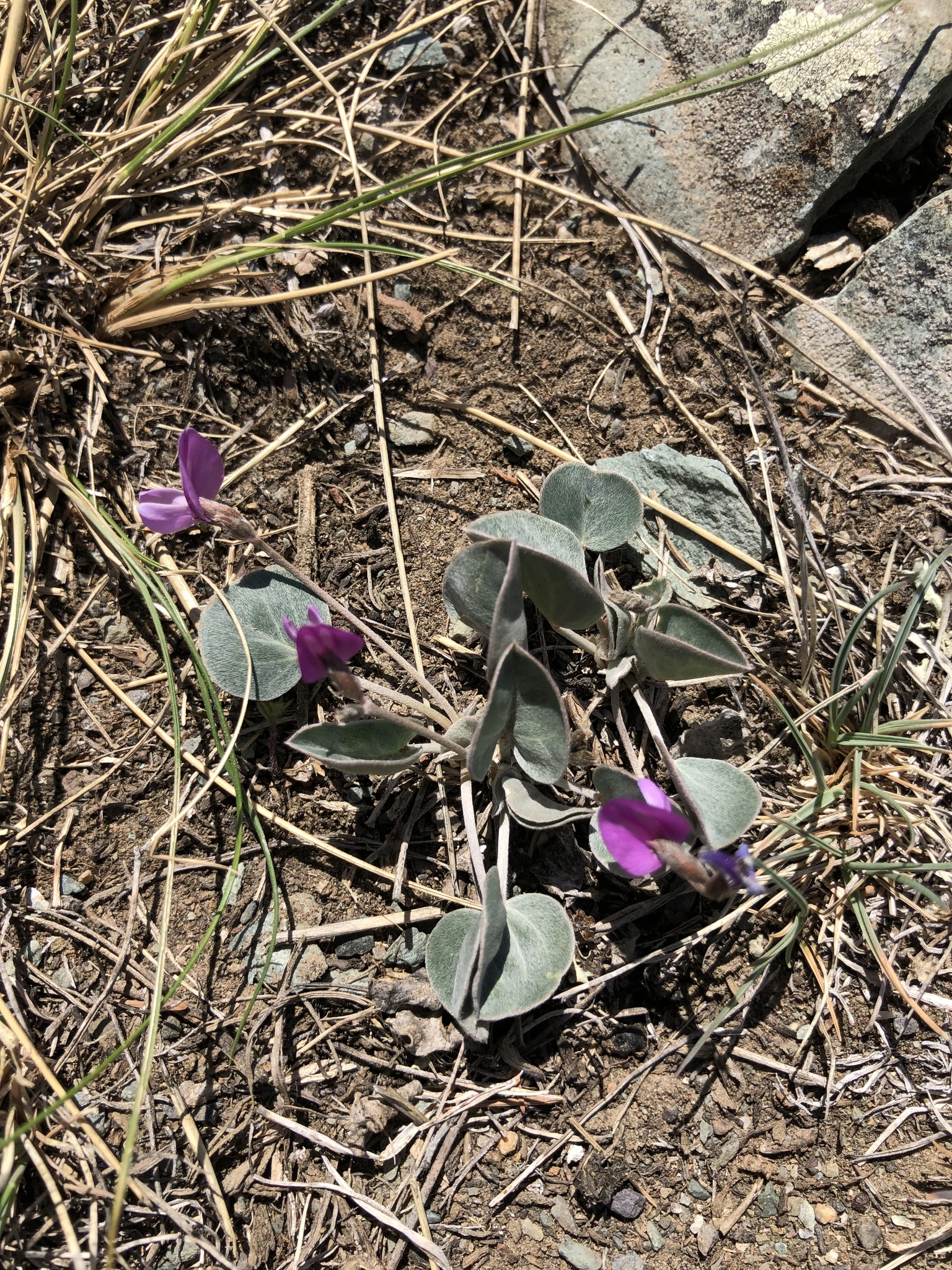
- Gueldenstaedtia monophylla

Scientific classification
- Kingdom: Plantae
- Clade: Embryophytes
- Clade: Tracheophytes
- Clade: Spermatophytes
- Clade: Angiosperms
- Clade: Eudicots
- Clade: Rosids
- Order: Fabales
- Family: Fabaceae
- Subfamily: Faboideae
- Tribe: Hedysareae
- Genus: Gueldenstaedtia; Fisch. (1823)

Synonyms
- Amblytropis Kitag. (1936)

= Gueldenstaedtia =

Genus of legumes

Gueldenstaedtia is a genus of flowering plants in the family Fabaceae. It belongs to the subfamily Faboideae. It includes four species native to Asia, ranging from India and Pakistan to Myanmar, Laos, China, Mongolia, and central Siberia.

- Gueldenstaedtia guangxiensis W.L.Sha & X.X.Chen
- Gueldenstaedtia henryi Ulbr.
- Gueldenstaedtia monophylla Fisch.
- Gueldenstaedtia verna (Georgi) Boriss.
