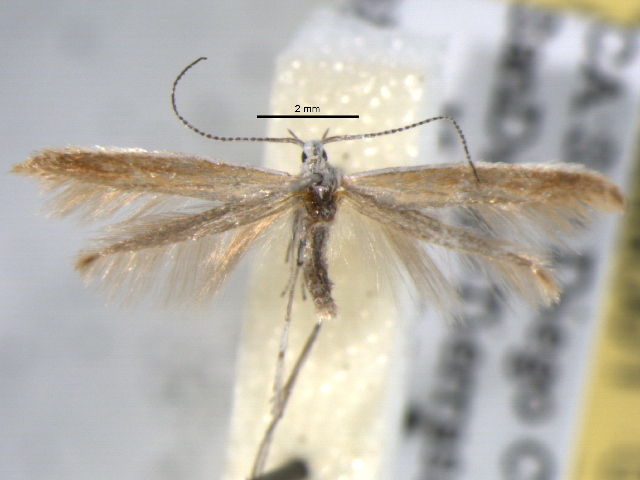

Scientific classification
- Kingdom: Animalia
- Phylum: Arthropoda
- Clade: Pancrustacea
- Class: Insecta
- Order: Lepidoptera
- Family: Coleophoridae
- Genus: Coleophora
- Species: C. accordella

Binomial name
- Coleophora accordella Walsingham, 1882

= Coleophora accordella =

Species of moth

Coleophora accordella is a moth of the family Coleophoridae. It is found in the United States, including California and Utah.

The larvae feed on the leaves of Hedysarum and Lotus species. They create a lobe case.
