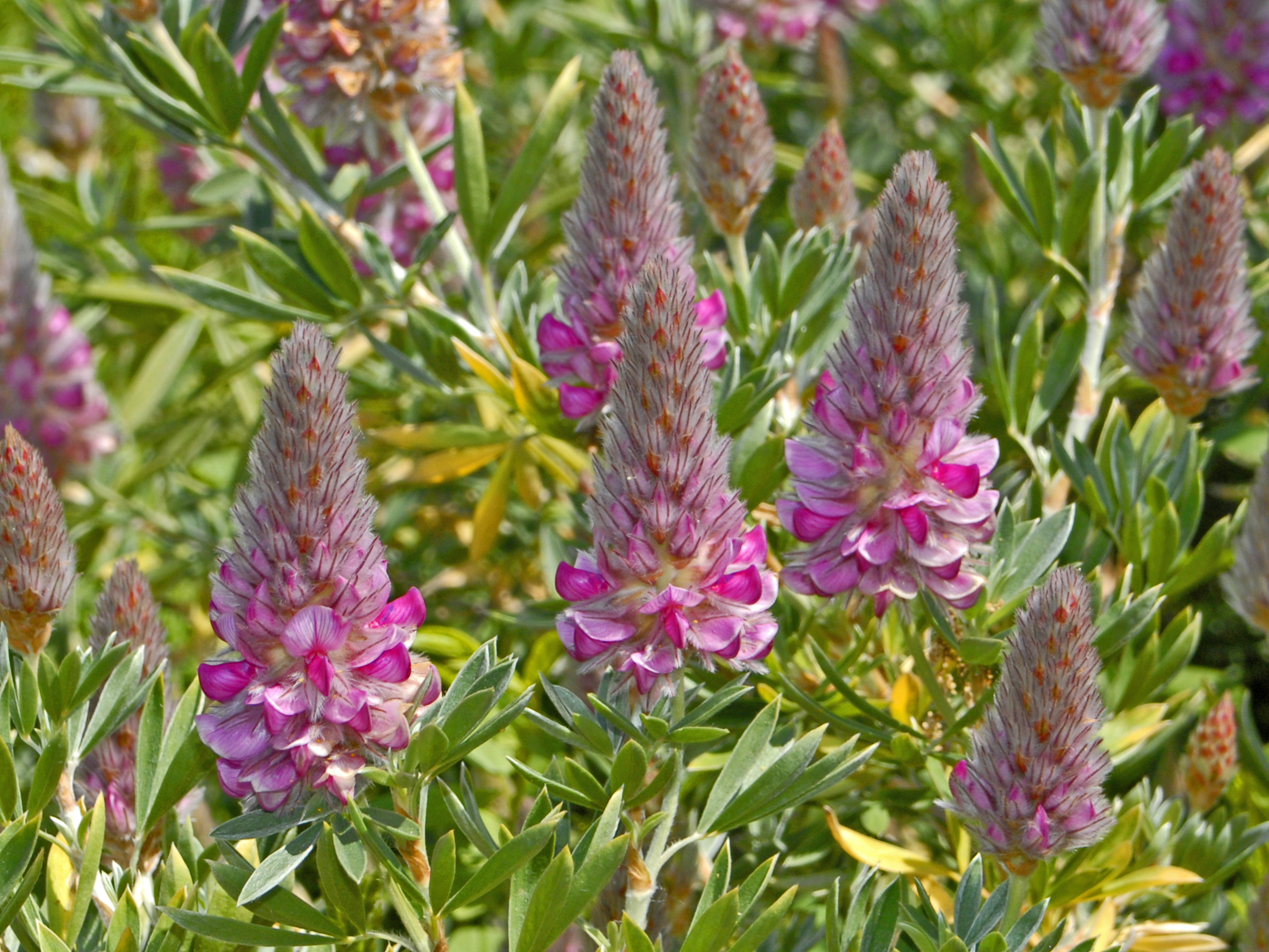
- Flowers of Ebenus cretica at the Jardin des Plantes, Paris

Scientific classification
- Kingdom: Plantae
- Clade: Tracheophytes
- Clade: Angiosperms
- Clade: Eudicots
- Clade: Rosids
- Order: Fabales
- Family: Fabaceae
- Subfamily: Faboideae
- Genus: Ebenus
- Species: E. cretica

Binomial name
- Ebenus cretica L.

= Ebenus cretica =

Species of legume

Ebenus cretica, common name Cretan ebony, is a leguminous small shrub in the family Fabaceae.

== Description ==
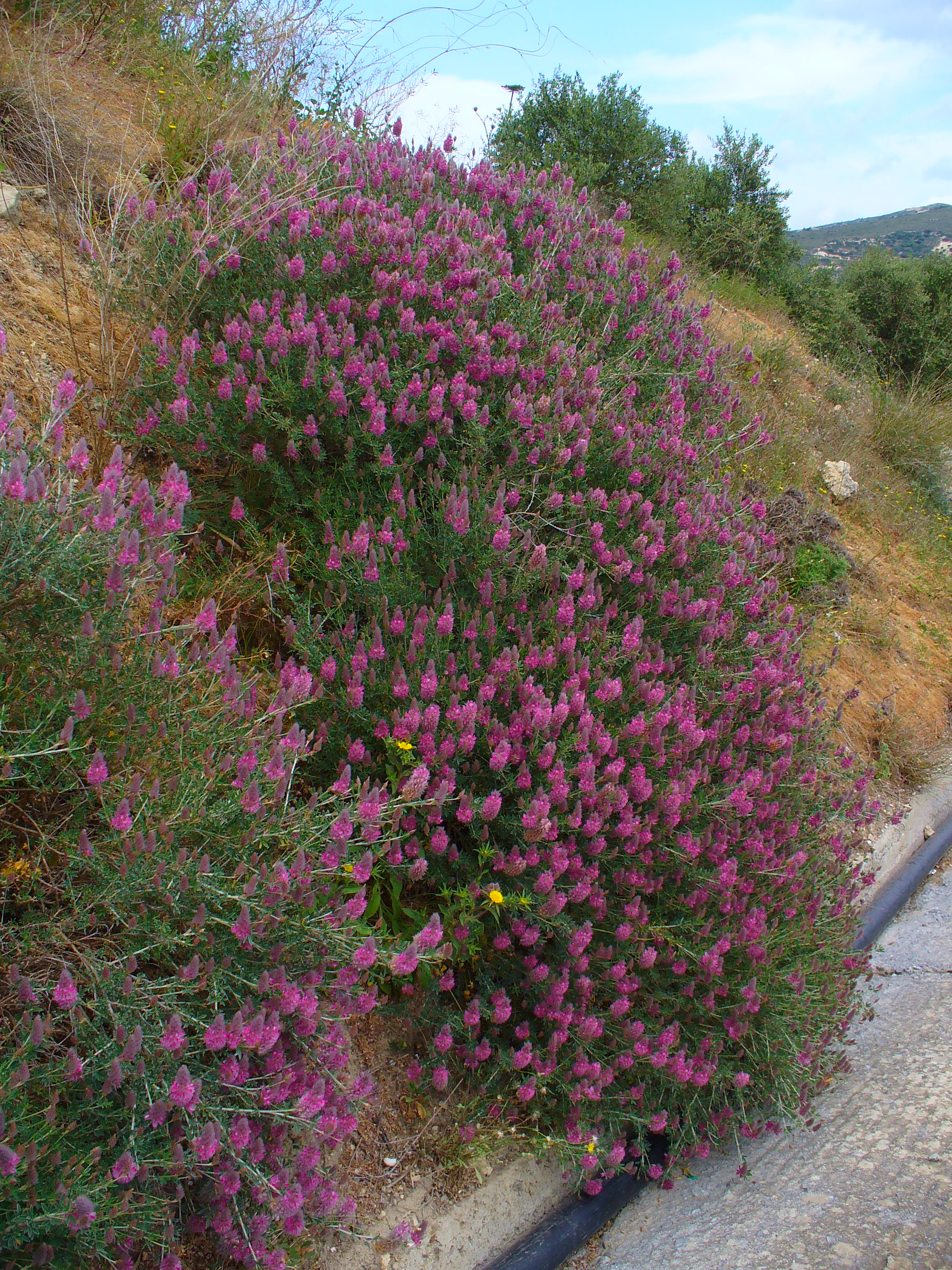
Plants of Ebenus cretica

Ebenus cretica can reach a height of 50–100 centimetres (20–39 in). This perennial flowering plant has composite pubescent leaves and bright pink or purple flowers, on 5–20 centimetres (2.0–7.9 in) long racemes. These flowers bloom from late March to June.

== Distribution ==
This species is native to the Mediterranean island of Crete. It grows on rocky hillsides or on steep cliffs, at an elevation of 0–600 metres (0–1,969 ft) above sea level.
