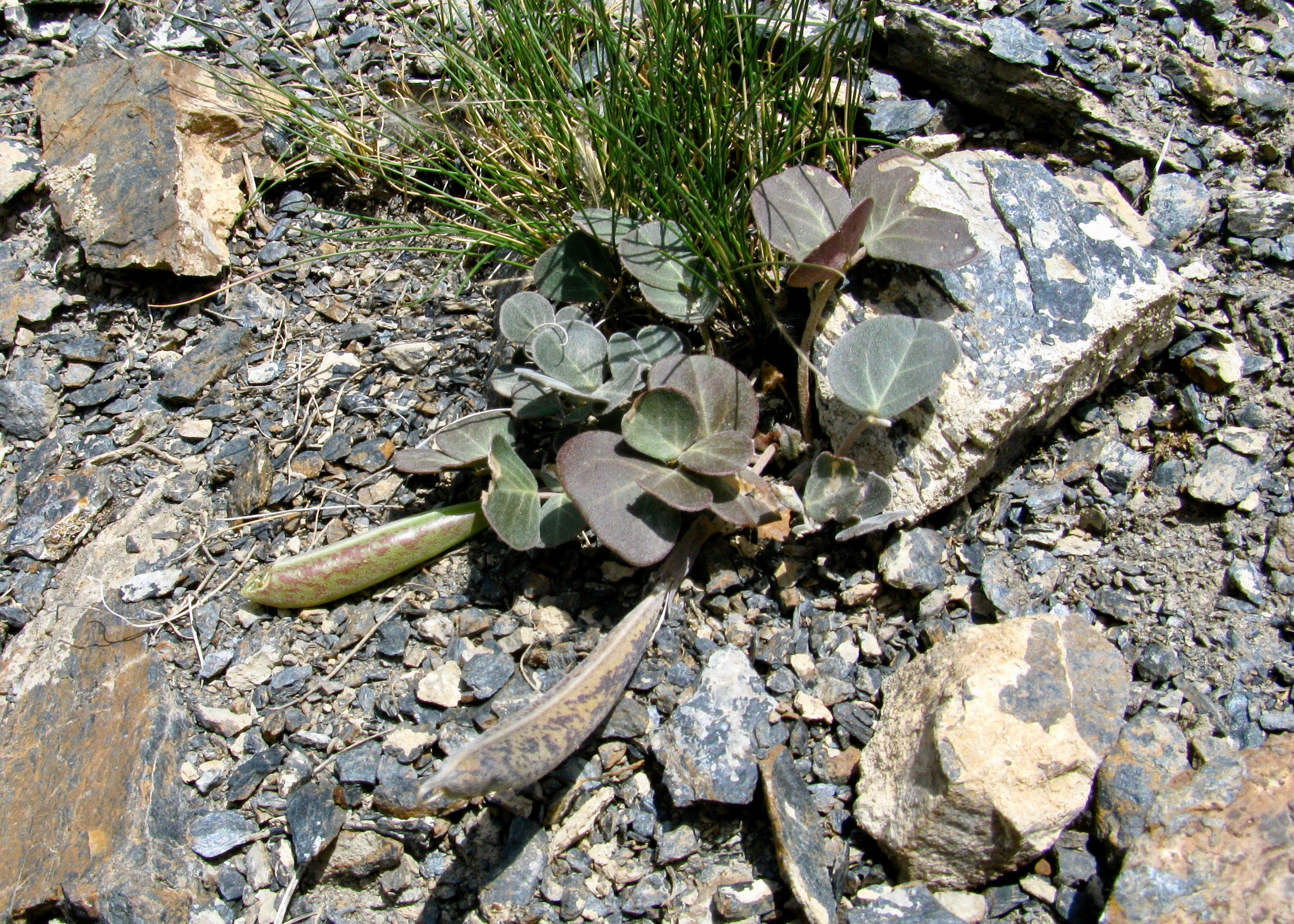

Scientific classification
- Kingdom: Plantae
- Clade: Tracheophytes
- Clade: Angiosperms
- Clade: Eudicots
- Clade: Rosids
- Order: Fabales
- Family: Fabaceae
- Subfamily: Faboideae
- Genus: Chesneya
- Species: C. ternata

Binomial name
- Chesneya ternata (Korsh.) Popov

Synonyms
- Kostyczewa ternata Korsh.

= Chesneya ternata =

Species of flowering plant

Chesneya ternata is a species of flowering plant in the family Fabaceae. Its native range is Kazakhstan to Afghanistan, going through the territories of countries such as Uzbekistan, Turkmenistan, Kyrgyzstan and Tajikistan.
