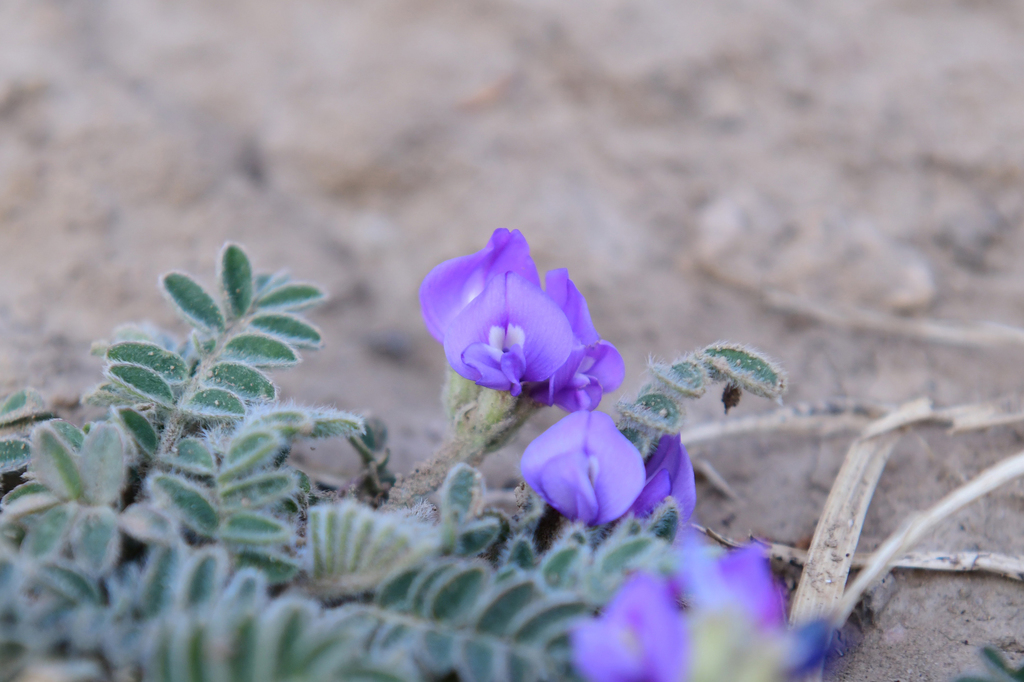

Scientific classification
- Kingdom: Plantae
- Clade: Tracheophytes
- Clade: Angiosperms
- Clade: Eudicots
- Clade: Rosids
- Order: Fabales
- Family: Fabaceae
- Subfamily: Faboideae
- Genus: Gueldenstaedtia
- Species: G. verna

Binomial name
- Gueldenstaedtia verna (Georgi) Boriss.

= Gueldenstaedtia verna =

Species of flowering plant

Gueldenstaedtia verna is a species of flowering plant in the family Fabaceae.

This sprawling perennial herb was first described in 1775 as Astragalus vernus by Johann Gottlieb Georgi, and has been independently described and named by many different authors. However in 1953, it received its current name, Gueldenstaedtia verna, in a publication by Antonina Borissova.

It grows from 5-10 cm tall, and has long, thick roots. The leaves grow from the root and are pinnate, with 4-8 pairs of leaflets, and having a short protrusion at the end. The petioles are 3-8 cm long, and covered in long brown hairs. The stipules are ovate and have long, recumbent hairs. The flower stalk is 4-9 cm long, covered with long brown hairs, is leafless, and has 1-4 flowers in a corymb. The purple flowers bloom in July and August. In South Korea, it grows in Gyeongsan, Chilgok, and Daegu in Gyeongsangbuk-do, and is a rare plant.

== Distribution ==
It is native in East Asia from Siberia to north Indo-China, Mongolia, China, Korea, and north Pakistan. In Korea it is found in mountain forests.
