= Greuteria =

Scientific classification
- Kingdom: Plantae
- Clade: Tracheophytes
- Clade: Angiosperms
- Clade: Eudicots
- Clade: Rosids
- Order: Fabales
- Family: Fabaceae
- Subfamily: Faboideae
- Tribe: Hedysareae
- Genus: Greuteria; Amirahm. & Kaz.Osaloo

Genus of plants

Greuteria is a genus of flowering plants belonging to the family Fabaceae.

Its native range is Northwestern Africa.

Species:

- Greuteria argyrea (Greuter & Burdet) Amirahm. & Kaz.Osaloo
- Greuteria membranacea (Coss. & Balansa) Amirahm. & Kaz.Osaloo
