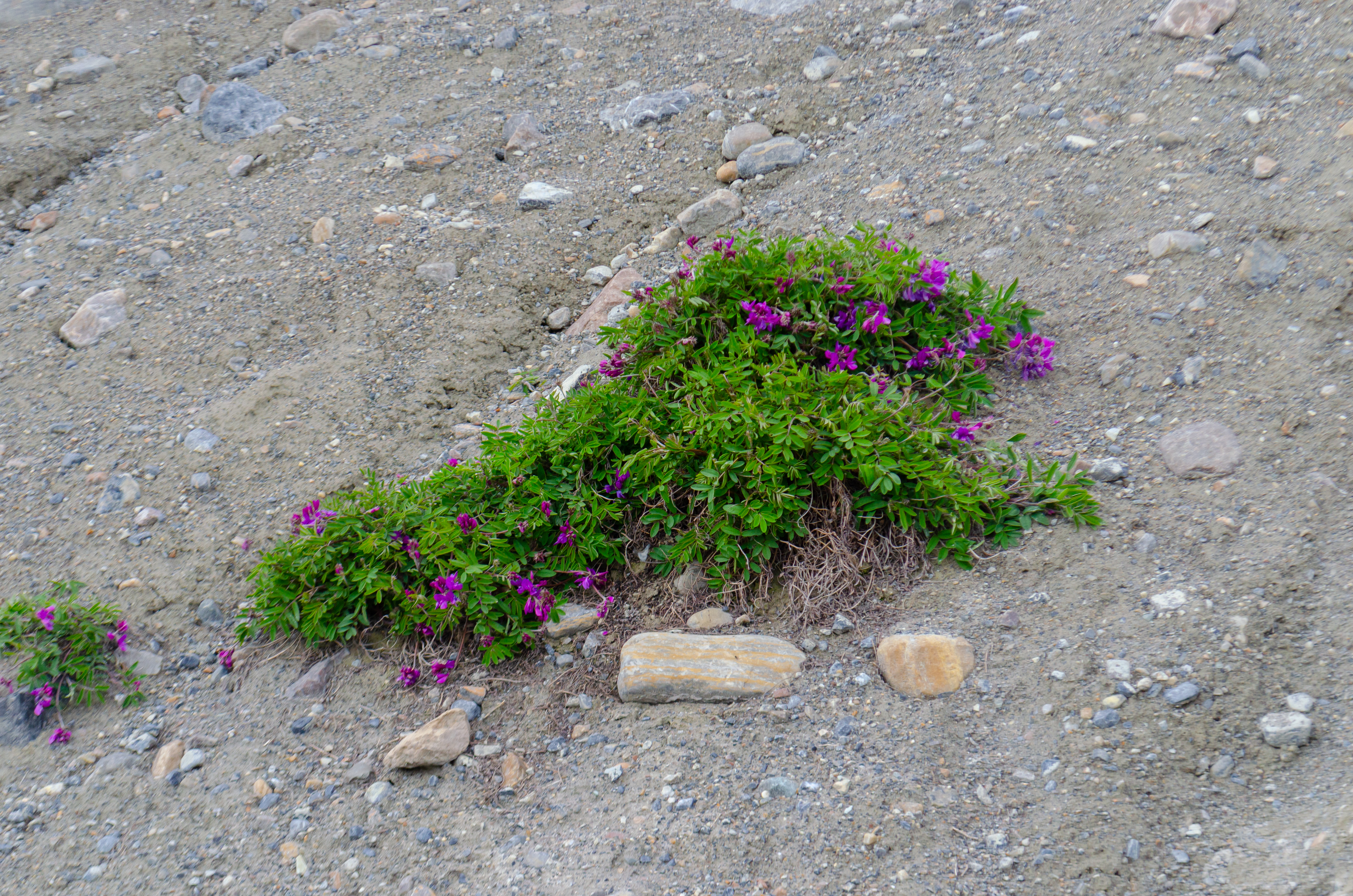
- Hedysarum boreale in Jasper National Park, Canada

Conservation status
- Secure (NatureServe)

Scientific classification
- Kingdom: Plantae
- Clade: Embryophytes
- Clade: Tracheophytes
- Clade: Angiosperms
- Clade: Eudicots
- Clade: Rosids
- Order: Fabales
- Family: Fabaceae
- Subfamily: Faboideae
- Genus: Hedysarum
- Species: H. boreale

Binomial name
- Hedysarum boreale Nutt.

Subspecies
- Hedysarum boreale subsp. boreale; Hedysarum boreale subsp. mackenziei (Richardson) S.L.Welsh

Synonyms
- List: Hedysarum boreale var. typicum Rollins (1940)

= Hedysarum boreale =

Species of plant in the pea family

Hedysarum boreale is a species of flowering plant in the family Fabaceae, or legume family, and is known by the common names Utah sweetvetch, boreal sweet-vetch, northern sweetvetch, and plains sweet-broom. It is native to North America, where it is widespread in northern and western regions of Canada and the United States. The ssp. mackenzii can even be found in the Canadian Arctic Archipelago.

This species is quite variable in morphology. There are several ecotypes. In general, it is a perennial herb growing from a deep taproot with a woody stem base. It has nitrogen-fixing root nodules. The plant grows 1 to 2 feet (0.3 to 0.6 m) tall. The hairless leaves are compound, divided into a number of leaflets. The inflorescence is a raceme of white, pink, or purple flowers. The fruit is a legume pod containing kidney-shaped seeds. Honeybees pollinate the flowers.

This plant grows on well-drained loams as well as soils with clay and sand. It can grow on soils with moderate levels of salinity, and can tolerate a range of soil pH. In the wild it generally grows at elevation, between 4,000 and 8,000 feet (1,200 and 2,400 m).

This plant is sometimes added to seed mixes used for rangeland improvement. Its nitrogen-fixing ability improves soil quality. The plant is palatable to livestock and wild animals. It is an important component of Sage Grouse habitat. The cultivar 'Timp' is an improved plant line selected for its adaptability and seed production qualities. The plant can be used in xeriscaping and as a seeded roadside flower. It is good for stabilizing soil.

The wild plant was considered poisonous by some Native American groups, but it was utilized as a food source, particularly the roots, which taste like licorice. The roots were also used by Native American groups for medicinal purposes.
