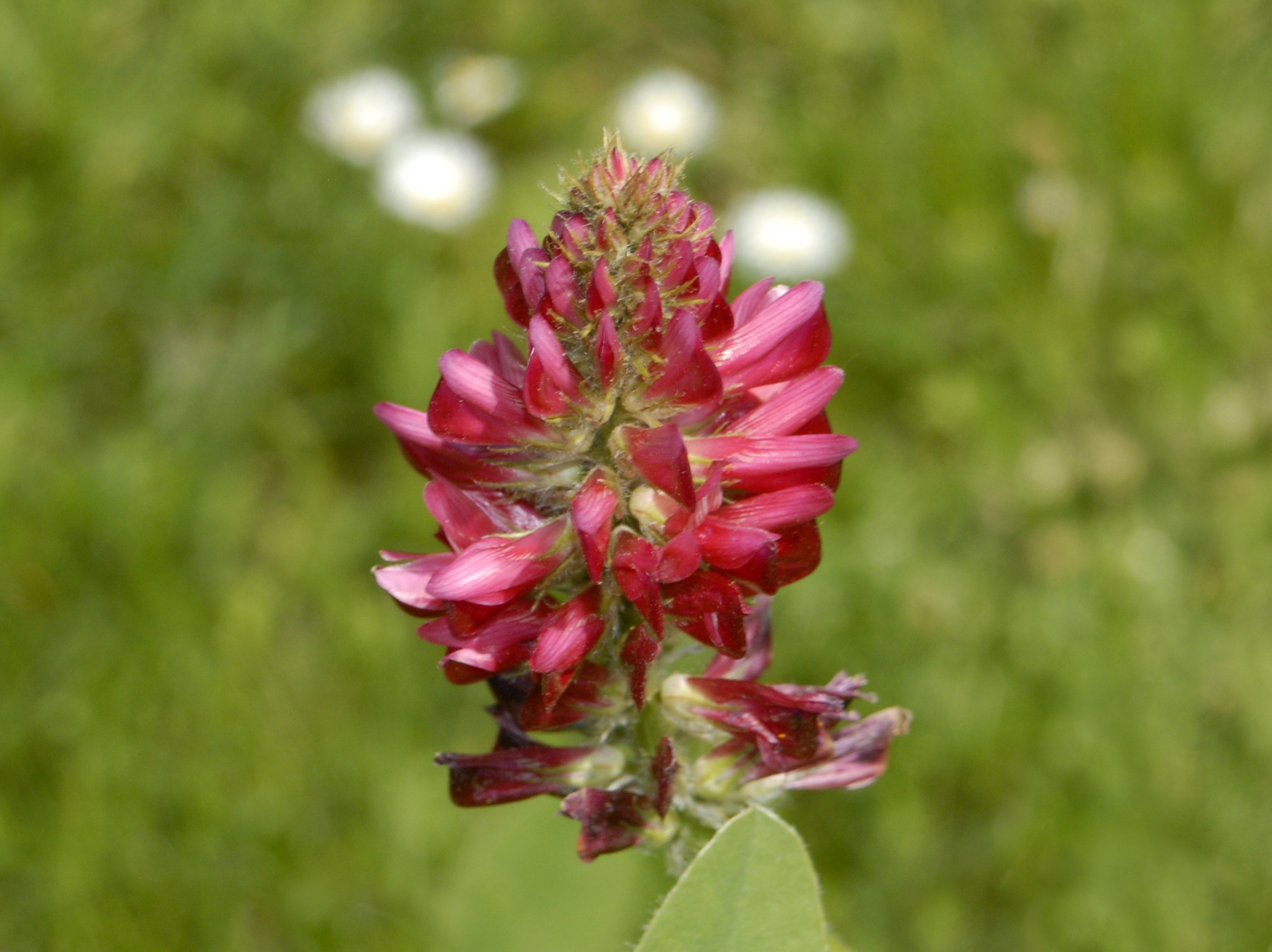

Scientific classification
- Kingdom: Plantae
- Clade: Tracheophytes
- Clade: Angiosperms
- Clade: Eudicots
- Clade: Rosids
- Order: Fabales
- Family: Fabaceae
- Subfamily: Faboideae
- Genus: Sulla
- Species: S. coronaria

Binomial name
- Sulla coronaria (L.) Medik.

Synonyms
- Hedysarum coronarium L.

= Sulla coronaria =

Species of legume

Sulla coronaria is a perennial herb native to Malta, Algeria, Morocco, Tunisia, southern Italy and Spain, cultivated for animal fodder and hay, and for honey production.

The plant is deep-rooted and drought-resistant, growing to 1–1.5 m tall with leaves imparipinnate with 7–11 leaflets. Flowers are red, with the standard 12–15 mm long; fruits are jointed and made of 2–4 spinulose articles. Pods have a yellow thorny surface that turns brown at maturity.
