= 2021 Calgary municipal election =

Local elections

- October 18, 2021

Mayor and 14 councillors to Calgary City Council
- Turnout: 46.38% (▼11.7pp)
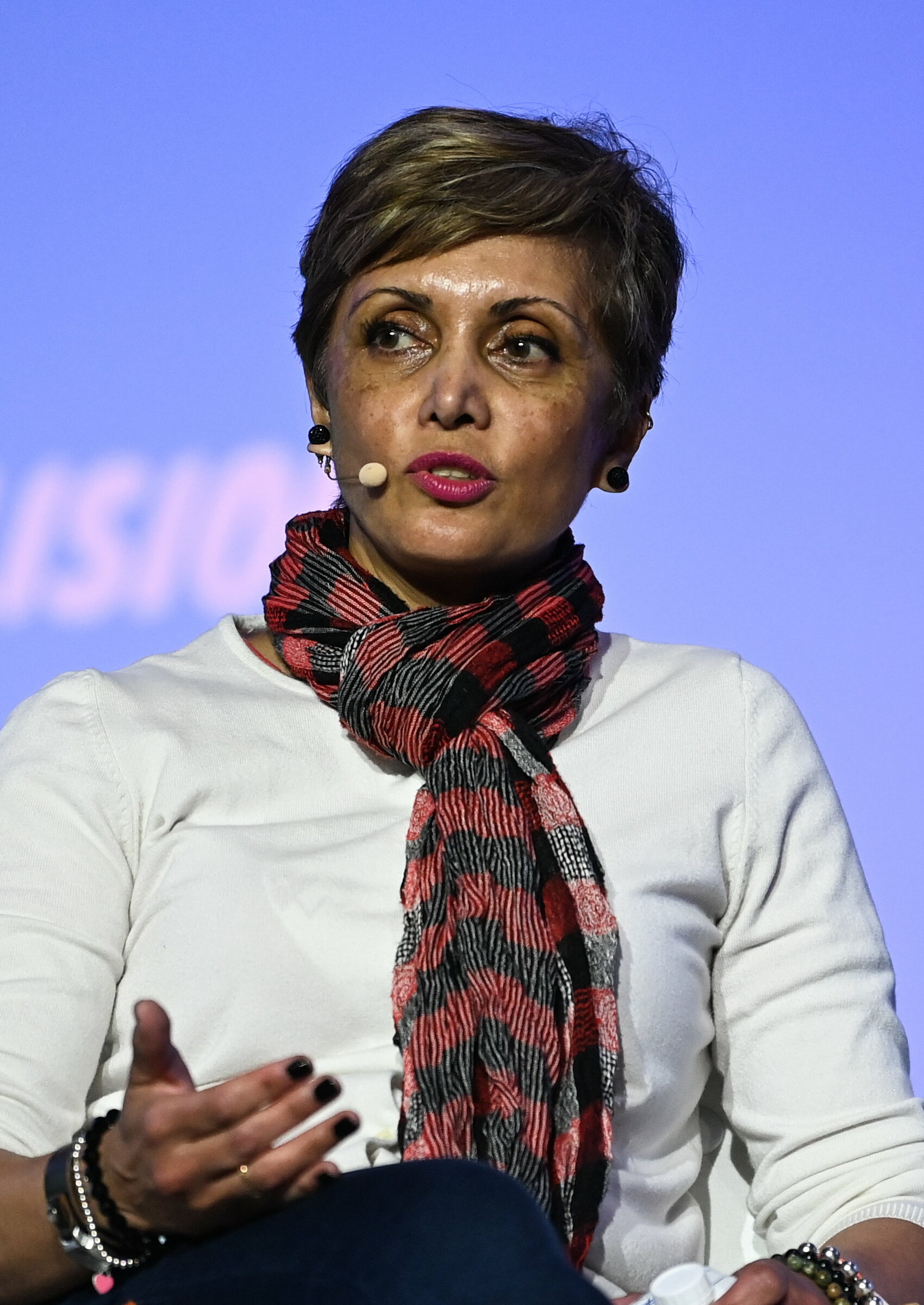

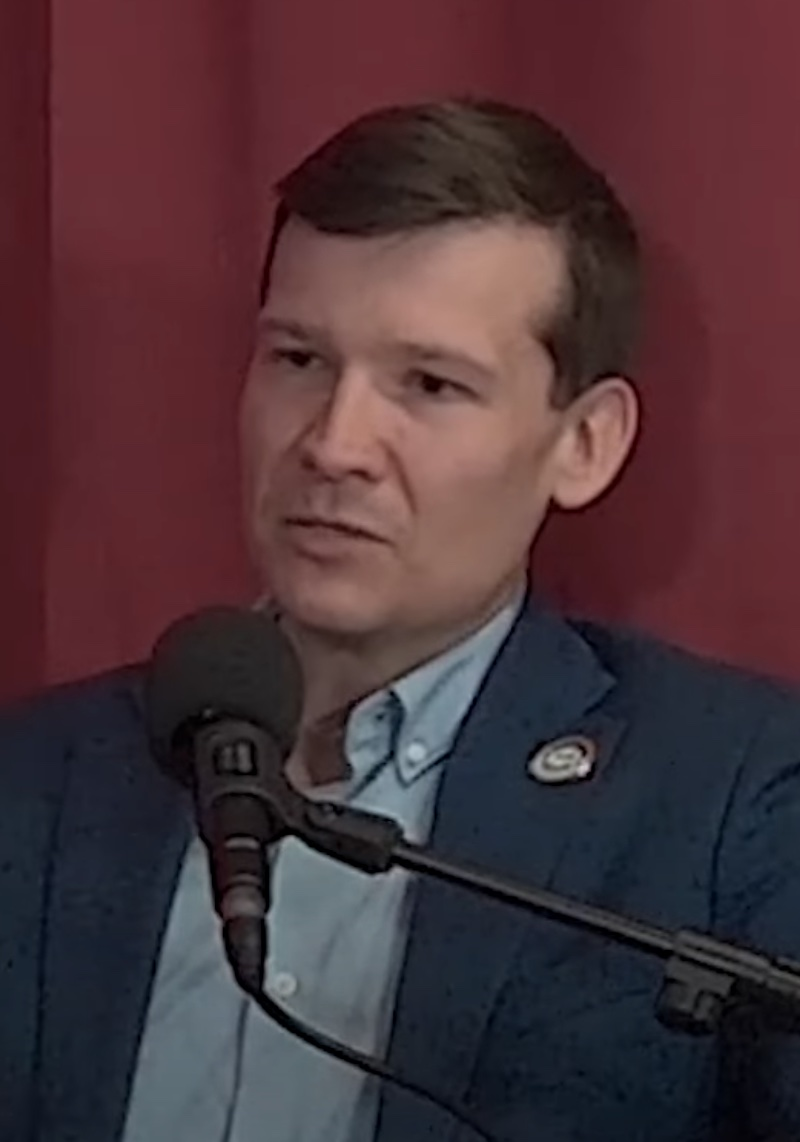

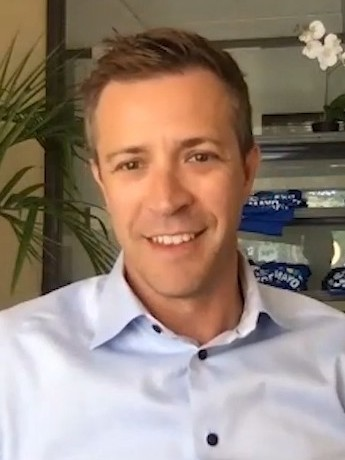
Candidate	Jyoti Gondek	Jeromy Farkas	Jeff Davison
Popular vote	174,649	115,742	50,279
Percentage	45.13%	29.91%	12.99%
Mayor before election
Naheed Nenshi
Elected mayor
Jyoti Gondek

The 2021 Calgary municipal election was held on October 18, 2021, to elect a mayor and fourteen councillors to the Calgary City Council.

In conjunction with the elections for Calgary City Council, residents cast ballots for trustees of the Calgary Board of Education and the Calgary Catholic School District, a municipal vote on the question of returning to fluoridation of the city's water supply, and three provincially mandated votes: a Senate nominee election, as well as referendums on provincial equalization and on the adoption of permanent daylight saving time.

== Background ==
Calgary City Council is the fifteen-member elected body that governs the City of Calgary under the council–manager government. Council is led by the Mayor elected at-large, which is the designated Chief Elected Official. Under the Municipal Government Act the Mayor is treated as an equal member of council, with the only significant power provided to the mayor is de facto membership on all council committees. The remaining members of Calgary City Council are fourteen councillors elected by residents of the fourteen wards dividing the city. The Calgary municipal election is held under the first-past-the-post method of voting, where the candidate with the most votes is elected to a four-year term.

The 2021 Calgary municipal election was the 103rd municipal election in the City of Calgary's history and the first to elect a woman as its mayor.

A number of incumbent councillors declined to contest the 2021 election including Druh Farrell (Ward 7), Shane Keating (Ward 12), Evan Woolley (Ward 8), and Ward Sutherland (Ward 1). On July 8, incumbent Ward 5 councillor George Chahal withdrew from the municipal election to accept the nomination for the Liberal Party of Canada in the Calgary Skyview district in the 2021 Canadian federal election. Chahal was subsequently elected to the House of Commons of Canada.

Long-time councillor Ray Jones (Ward 10), resigned effective October 19, 2020, due to heath issues, no by-election was required to fill the councillor position due to the proximity of Jones' resignation to the 2021 municipal election. Jones was first elected in the 1993 by-election, and served as a councillor for 27 years.

A union-backed Third Party Advertiser “Calgary’s Future” endorsed Jyoti Gondek and a list of 13 candidates for the 14 council positions, and 8 of the 13 were elected.

On April 6, 2021, incumbent three-term Mayor Naheed Nenshi announced on he would not seek a fourth term as mayor.

Former Liberal Member of Parliament and Member of the Legislative Assembly of Alberta Kent Hehr announced he would run for Mayor on September 6, 2021, but subsequently withdrew prior to the nomination date on September 20.

== Candidates ==
X = incumbent. Candidates as listed have filed the necessary paperwork with the City of Calgary.

=== Mayor ===
Candidate	Vote	%
Jyoti Gondek	176,344	45.17
Jeromy Farkas	116,698	29.89
Jeff Davison	50,654	12.98
Brad Field	19,329	4.95
Jan Damery	8,935	2.29
Grace Yan	2,746	0.70
Zane Novak	1,991	0.51
Dean Hopkins	1,832	0.47
Kevin J. Johnston	1,565	0.40
Zaheed Ali Khan	1,247	0.32
Virginia Stone	1,172	0.30
Shaoli Wang	1,061	0.27
Ian Chiang	973	0.25
Teddy Ogbonna	862	0.22
Emile Gabriel	682	0.17
Zac Hartley	582	0.15
Sunny Singh	572	0.15
James Desautels	531	0.14
Mizanur Rahman	450	0.12
Larry Heather	429	0.11
Stan Waciak	423	0.11
Paul Michael Hallelujah	376	0.10
Adam Roberts	308	0.08
Will Vizor	204	0.05
Geoff Rainey	162	0.04
Randall Kaiser	137	0.04
Cory Lanterman	118	0.03
David Clark (Withdrawn)		
Kent Hehr (Withdrawn)		
Grant Prior (Withdrawn)		

=== Ward 1 ===
Candidate	Vote	%
Sonya Sharp	14,038	44.74
Steve Webb	5,123	16.33
Chris Blatch	3,446	10.98
Larry Tweedale	2,502	7.97
Jacob McGregor	1,834	5.85
Tom Antonick	1,590	5.07
Shauna Sears	1,288	4.10
Gaz Qamar	1,204	3.84
John Flip	352	1.12

=== Ward 2 ===
Candidate	Vote	%
Jennifer Wyness	12,616	48.09
Kim (Dong) Tyers	6,865	26.17
Joe Magliocca (X)	2,701	10.30
Francis Aranha	1,792	6.83
Sareen Singh	1,133	4.32
Theo van Besouw	1,126	4.29
Total	26,233	100

=== Ward 3 ===
Candidate	Vote	%
Jasmine Mian	7,262	31.14
Brent Trenholm	4,970	21.31
Jun Lin	3,409	14.62
Ian McAnerin	2,590	11.10
Gurbir Singh Nijjar	2,118	9.08
Nate Pike	1,701	7.29
Kumar Sharma	1,033	4.43
Hamayun Akbar	241	1.03

=== Ward 4 ===
Candidate	Vote	%
Sean Chu (X)	12,653	42.71
Daniel James (DJ) Kelly	12,553	42.38
Angela McIntyre	3,460	11.68
Shane Roberts	957	3.23

=== Ward 5 ===
Candidate	Vote	%
Raj Dhaliwal	4,654	28.01
Stan Sandhu	4,276	25.73
Aryan Sadat	3,887	23.39
Tariq Khan	1,882	11.33
Tudor Dinca	927	5.58
Tahir Merali	540	3.25
Anand James Chetty	450	2.71

=== Ward 6 ===
Candidate	Vote	%
Richard Pootmans	16,388	47.67
Lana Bentley	9,558	27.80
Sanjeev Kad	6,950	20.22
Duane Hall	1,484	4.32

=== Ward 7 ===
Candidate	Vote	%
Terry Wong	6,291	25.38
Erin Waite	5,638	22.74
Heather McRae	5,278	21.29
Marilyn North Peigan	3,784	15.26
Matt Lalonde	1,425	5.75
Derek Williams	778	3.14
Greg Amoruso	731	2.95
Benjamin Shepherd	581	2.34
Daria Bogdanov	285	1.15

=== Ward 8 ===
Candidate	Vote	%
Courtney Walcott	9,559	31.46
Gary Bobrovitz	6,914	22.75
Natalie Winkler	3,536	11.64
Paul Bergmann	3,435	11.30
Cornelia Wiebe	3,021	9.94
Monique Auffrey	2,168	7.13
Philip Mitchell	1,082	3.56
Yogi Henderson	418	1.38
Madina Kanayeva	253	0.83

=== Ward 9 ===
Candidate	Vote	%
Gian-Carlo Carra (X)	7,056	35.59
Naomi Withers	6,895	34.77
Kimberly Feser	1,855	9.36
Lori Masse	977	4.93
Daymond Khan	878	4.43
Derek Reimer	870	4.39
John-William Wade	861	4.34
Abdirizak Hadi	221	1.11
Syed Hasnain	119	0.60
Omar M'Keyo	96	0.48

=== Ward 10 ===
Candidate	Vote	%
Andre Chabot	6,414	32.71
Abed Harb	5,547	28.29
Tony Dinh	3,014	15.37
Bud Thurlow	1,130	5.76
Esther Sutherland	691	3.52
Carla Evers	630	3.21
Jasbir (Jesse) Minhas	618	3.15
Leslyn Joseph	429	2.19
Roshan Chumber	398	2.03
Issa Mosa	393	2.00
Mushtaq Kayani	345	1.76

=== Ward 11 ===
Candidate	Vote	%
Kourtney Branagan	10,889	28.36
Rob Ward	10,008	26.07
Lauren Herschel	4,690	12.22
Mike Jamieson	3,786	9.86
Geoffrey Vanderburg	3,348	8.72
Vance Bertram	2,658	6.92
Devin DeFraine	2,195	5.72
Dawid Pawlowski	816	2.13

=== Ward 12 ===
Candidate	Vote	%
Evan Spencer	9,822	38.90
Craig Chandler	5,188	20.55
Steven Phan	4,998	19.79
Teresa Hargreaves	2,183	8.65
Mike LaValley	1,734	6.87
Michael Streilein	558	2.21
John (Chubby Hubby) Duta	420	1.66
Dirk Fontaine	346	1.37

=== Ward 13 ===
Candidate	Vote	%
Dan McLean	12,802	46.48
Jay Unsworth	8,371	30.39
Diane Colley-Urquhart (X)	6,371	23.13

=== Ward 14 ===
Candidate	Vote	%
Peter Demong (X)	20,412	65.57
Andrea Hinton	5,342	17.16
Anton Ovtchinnikov	3,098	9.95
Stephen Dabbagh	2,277	7.31

=== Public school trustees ===
Calgary School District
Candidate	Votes	%
Ward 1/2
Adam Dossa	3,905	10
Dana Downey	24,509	65
Allan To	3,291	9
Melanie Wen	5,795	15
Ward 3/4
Althea Adams (X)	10,055	29
Najeeb Butt	2,810	8
Claudia Fuentes	4,937	14
Laura Hack	16,232	47
Oun Saegh	278	1
Ward 5/10
Malik Ashraf	4,174	16
Jay Chowdhury	1,152	4
Marilyn Dennis (X)	7,725	29
Hasreet Dhami	3,124	12
Humaira Falak	3,771	14
Christa Harris	2,337	9
Stephen John	1,311	5
Michael Siapno Juarez	1,155	4
Baldev Kaur Tamber	1,200	4
Vikas Verma	790	3
Ward 6/7
Olga Barcelo	3,640	9
Patricia Bolger	19,963	52
Barbara La Pointe	6,988	18
Cheryl Munson	4,406	11
Carter Thomson	3,714	10
Ward 8/9
David Barrett	10,241	29
Slobodab Mladenov	730	2
Stacey Selley	7,322	21
Monica Truong	6,011	17
Susan Vukadinovic	10,680	31
Ward 11/13
Shirley Anderson	13,888	32
Nancy Close	22,678	52
Hilary Sellen	7,302	17
Ward 12/14
Jim Govenlock	2,844	8
Shawn Hubbard	5,785	17
Maxx Lapthorne	6,580	19
Charlene May	16,029	46
Dar Zuch	3,648	10

=== Separate school trustees ===
Calgary Catholic School District
Candidate	Votes	%
Ward 1/2/Cochrane
Myra D'Souza (X)		
Blair Pedron Daniels		
Brian O'Neill		
Edney Saldanha		
Edward Tse		
Ward 3/5/Airdrie
Oscar "Jun" Buera		
Addie Corah		
Pina Lamb		
Linda Wellman (X)		
Ward 4/7
Joe DeGagne		
Dan Penna		
Pamela Rath (X)		
Ward 6/8
Lory Iovinelli (X)	Acclaimed	
Ward 9/10/Chestermere
Shannon Cook		
John D. Ramsay		
Oksana Shevchenko		
Ward 11/12
Cathie Williams (X)	Acclaimed	
Ward 13/14
Mary Martin (X)	Acclaimed	

== Plebiscite ==
Calgary's 2021 municipal election included one plebiscite question regarding whether to reintroduce fluoridation to the water supply.

"Are you in favour of reintroducing fluoridation of the municipal water supply?"
Side	Votes	%
Yes	204,457	61.59
No	127,483	38.41

== Mayoral opinion polling ==
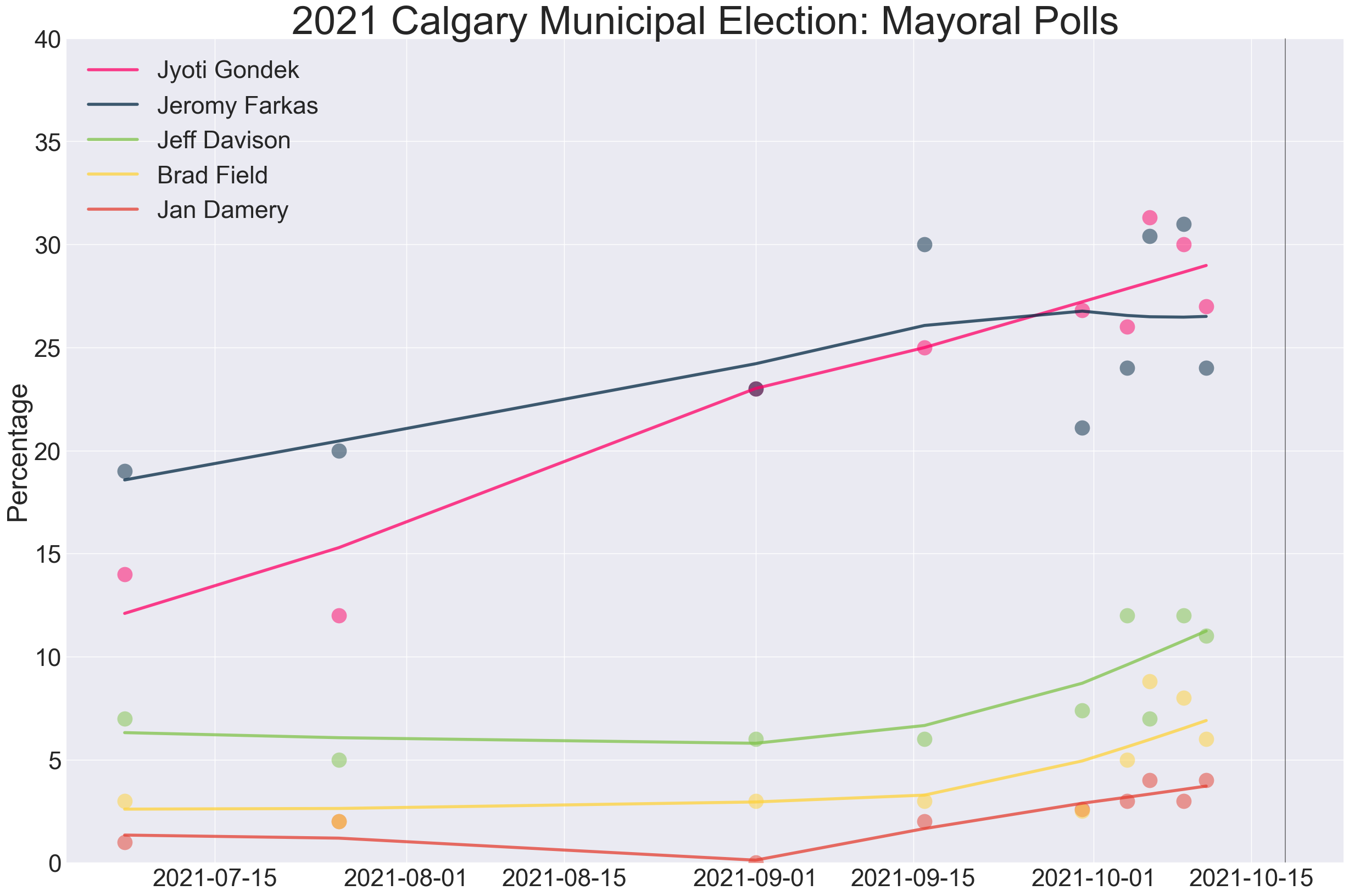

Polling firm	Date(s) administered	Jan Damery	Jeff Davison	Jeromy Farkas	Brad Field	Jyoti Gondek	Other	Sample size	Polling method
Actual results	October 18, 2021	2%	13%	30%	5%	45%	5%	390,383	N/A
Leger	Oct 8–11, 2021	4%	11%	24%	6%	27%	Undecided 20% Other 8%	502	Online
Northwest Research Groups	Oct 7–9, 2021	3%	12%	31%	8%	30%	Undecided 12% Other 5%	4636	Phone - Interactive Voice Response
Spadina Strategies	Oct 5–6, 2021	4%	7%	30.4%	8.8%	31.3%	Undecided 18.4%	668	Phone - Interactive Voice Response
Leger	Oct 1–4, 2021	3%	12%	24%	5%	26%	Undecided 29% Other 2% Zane Novak 1%	500	Online
Janet Brown Opinion Research	Sep 22–30, 2021	2.6%	7.4%	21.1%	2.5%	26.8%	Other 6.1% Don't know / None of the above 33.5%	1000	Online, Recruited unique panel
ThinkHQ	Sep 13–16, 2021	2%	6%	30%	3%	25%	Undecided 28% Other 2% Wouldn't vote 1% Kent Hehr 3%	1,109	Online
Mainstreet	Aug 29 – Sep 1, 2021	–	6%	23%	3%	23%	Undecided 34% Other 12%	808	Telephone
Leger	Jul 22–26, 2021	2%	5%	20%	2%	12%	Undecided 46% Other 12%	464	Online
Leger	Jul 1–7, 2021	1%	7%	19%	3%	14%	Undecided 55% Other 11%	500	Online
Mainstreet Research	Jan 25–26, 2021	–	–	30%	2%	6%	Naheed Nenshi 34% Undecided 22% Other 5%	1,603	Online
Common Sense Calgary	Jan 17–19, 2021	–	8.2%	54.5%	3.8%	19.8%	Other 4.3%	1,284	Telephone

== Issues ==
=== Fluoride plebiscite ===
On February 1, 2021, Calgary City Council approved a vote on a question on whether Calgarians support reintroducing fluoride to the city's water supply. The plebiscite was the seventh time Calgarians have been asked whether fluoride should be added to the municipal water system, with the plebiscites failing to gain support in the first four instances in 1957, 1961 1966, and 1971, and finally succeeding in 1989 and reaffirmed by voters again in 1998. Calgary City Council previously voted to remove fluoride from the water supply in February 2011, the program at the time cost $750,000 annually, and faced upcoming $6-million upgrade to water treatment plants to continue the program.

The Alberta Dental Association and College estimates that there is somewhere between 0.1 and 0.4 parts per million of fluoride naturally occurring in drinking water. City of Calgary administration planned that if reintroduced, the city's drinking water supply would be regulated at 0.7 parts per million of fluoride, at a cost of $30 million over 20 years.

=== Equalization referendum ===
Following the release of the Fair Deal Panel's recommendations in June 2020, Premier Jason Kenney announced a provincial referendum on a measure to remove equalization payments from the Constitution of Canada would be held in conjunction with the 2021 Alberta municipal elections. The announcement was criticized by Calgary Mayor Naheed Nenshi arguing it was a distraction for voters who should be focused on local issues. Mount Royal University political scientist Duane Bratt noted the inclusion of a generally conservative ballot issue would likely have the effect of increasing conservative participation and therefore conservative leaning candidate success in the otherwise non-partisan election.

The referendum question proposed by the Fair Deal Panel was "Do you support the removal of Section 36, which deals with the principle of equalization, from the Constitution Act, 1982?" The final wording of the question was changed slightly prior to approval by the Legislature to "Should Section 36(2) of the Constitution Act, 1982 — Parliament and the Government of Canada’s commitment to the principle of making equalization payments — be removed from the Constitution?"

In response to the provincial question, Calgary City Council began preparing a vote on a question asking if city had a fair fiscal relationship with the provincial government, however ultimately City Council decided not to include the question as a plebiscite during the election.

=== Daylight saving time referendum ===
On July 15, Premier Jason Kenney announced that in addition to the referendum on equalization, Albertans would also vote on whether to end the practice of observing daylight saving time. Albertans had previously voted on implementing daylight saving time twice, first in 1967 when Albertans rejected the proposal by a narrow margin with 48.75 per cent approving. Four years later in 1971, Albertans voted on daylight saving time again, this time overwhelmingly approving the proposal with 61.47 per cent supporting.

=== Senate nominee election ===
Between 1989 and 2012 Alberta has been the only province to hold Senate nominee elections. The 1989 and 1998 Alberta Senate nominee election were held in conjunction with the Alberta's municipal elections, while the 2004 and 2012 Alberta Senate nominee election were held in conjunction with elections for the Legislative Assembly of Alberta. The New Democratic government allowed the Senatorial Section Act to expire in 2016, which was subsequently reintroduced by the United Conservative government in 2019. Of the 10 nominees (often called "senators-in-waiting") in the previous votes, only five have been appointed to the Senate of Canada.

=== Candidacy of Kevin J. Johnston ===
Calgary mayor candidate Kevin J. Johnston posted a video on social media criticizing public health measures related to the COVID-19 pandemic in Alberta. Johnston stated as mayor he would go to the homes of Alberta Health Services (AHS) Environmental Public Health staff homes while armed, and vowed to dox a member of AHS. On May 14, 2021, a justice of Court of Queen's Bench of Alberta granted AHS a restraining order against Johnston, forbidding obstructing or interfering with AHS employees, taking video, photos or audio of employees or coming within 100 metres of AHS employees. Johnston was arrested the next day by Calgary Police Services after attending an illegal public gathering in contradiction of public health orders.

The City of Calgary investigated legal options to prevent the city's electors list from being shared with Johnston. Under the Local Authorities Election Act and the city's bylaws, the city was obligated to provide the electors list with all candidate. Alberta Health Services, other candidates and the media aired concerns of providing the names and addresses of all Calgarians, including AHS health inspectors which Johnston had previously doxed and made threats against. On May 18, 2021, the City of Calgary responded to the public concern by deciding not to create a voter list for the 2021 municipal election, meaning no candidate would receive information about voters names or addresses from the city.

On July 12, 2021, Johnston pleaded guilty to one charge of harassment and one charge of causing a disturbance related to two separate incidents after serving 48 days in custody. Johnston was sentenced to two consecutive 9 month periods of probation. In September 2021, Johnston pleaded guilty to breaching three court orders to comply with public health measures to reduce the spread of COVID-19, and was sentenced to 40 days in jail and to pay costs to Alberta Health Services of $20,000. In January 2022, he was arrested at the Alberta-Montana border, having failed to show up for jail sentences.

Johnston had previously ran as a mayoral candidate in the 2018 Mississauga municipal election, coming in second with 13.5 per cent of the popular vote. After the election, Johnston was sued and found liable for defamation. He was required to refrain from making defamatory statements about the plaintiff, and to pay $2.5 million in damages. The defamation was described by the judge as "hate speech at its worst". On October 4, 2021, Johnston was sentenced to 18 months in jail by the Ontario Superior Court for six instances of contempt of court in relation to comments made on social media about the original 2019 injunction.

== See also ==
- 2021 Alberta municipal elections
- 2021 Edmonton municipal election
- 2021 Lethbridge municipal election
- List of Calgary municipal elections
