= 2017 Calgary municipal election =

Election in Alberta, Canada

- October 16, 2017

Mayor and 14 councillors to Calgary City Council
- Turnout: 58.1% (▲19pp)
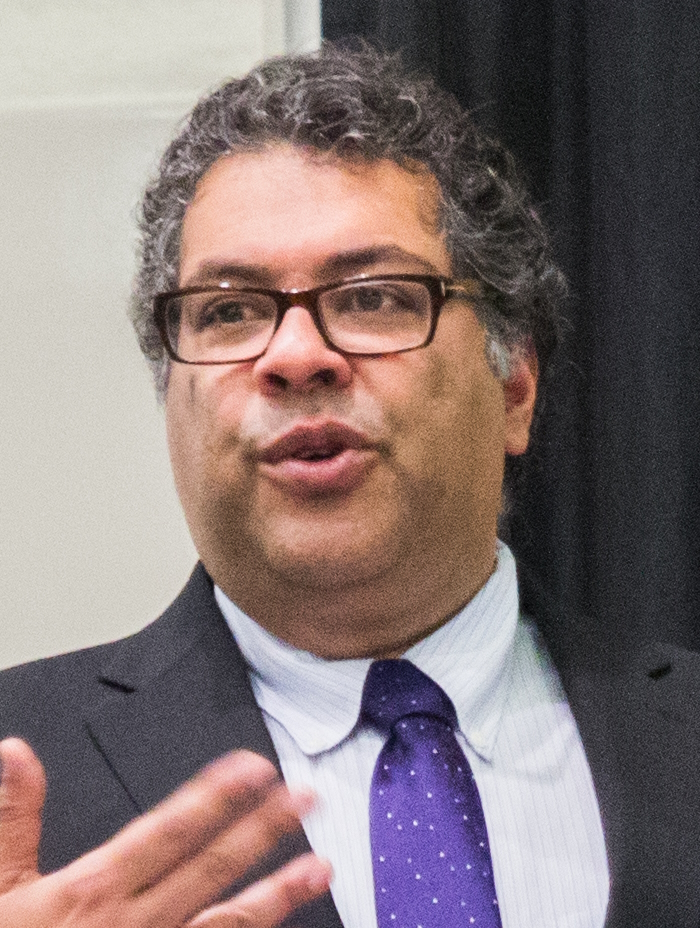

| Candidate | Naheed Nenshi | Bill Smith |
| Popular vote | 199,122 | 169,367 |
| Percentage | 51.4% | 43.7% |
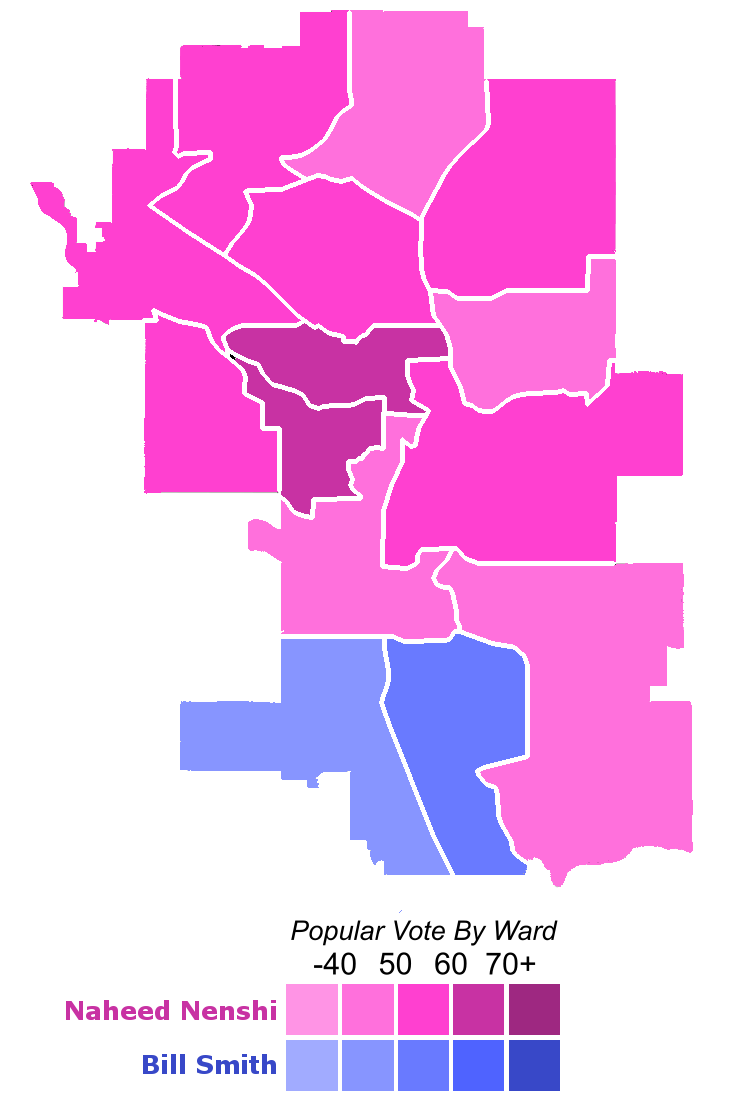
- Results of the City Council election
Mayor before election
Naheed Nenshi
Elected mayor
Naheed Nenshi

The 2017 Calgary municipal election was held on October 16, 2017, to elect a mayor, councillors to the city council, trustees to the Calgary Board of Education, and trustees to the Calgary Catholic School District.

From 1968 to 2013, provincial legislation required every municipality to hold elections every three years. The 28th Alberta Legislature introduced the Election Accountability Amendment Act (Bill 7) which among other reforms to provincial and municipal elections, amended the Local Authorities Election Act to extend the terms of local authorities including municipalities and school boards from three years to four years.

In addition, council members are now referred to as councillors, whereas they used the title "Alderman" prior to 2013. Advanced voting began on October 4 and ran through until October 11.

The voter turnout was 58.1%, the highest the turnout had been in over four decades.

== Candidates ==
X = incumbent

=== Mayor ===
| Candidate | Vote | % |
|---|---|---|
| Naheed Nenshi (X) | 199,122 | 51.41 |
| Bill Smith | 169,367 | 43.73 |
| Andre Chabot | 11,945 | 3.08 |
| Curtis Olson | 1,776 | 0.46 |
| David Lapp | 1,288 | 0.33 |
| Emile Gabriel | 1,258 | 0.32 |
| Larry Heather | 845 | 0.22 |
| Stan the Man Waciak | 664 | 0.17 |
| Brent Chisholm | 576 | 0.15 |
| Jason Achtymichuk | 465 | 0.12 |

=== City council ===
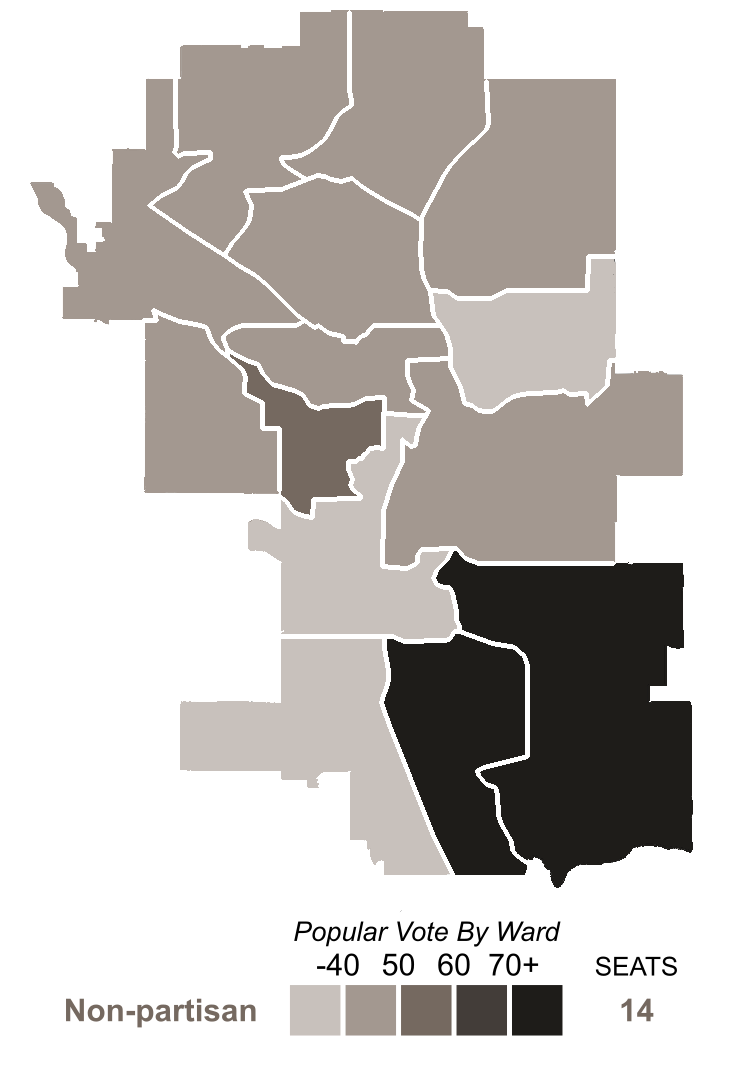
Calgary City Council, 2017 by ward

==== Ward 1 ====
| Candidate | Vote | % |
|---|---|---|
| Ward Sutherland (X) | 14,336 | 45.27 |
| Coral Bliss Taylor | 10,601 | 33.48 |
| Chris Blatch | 4,147 | 13.10 |
| Cole Christensen | 1,313 | 4.15 |
| Cam Khan | 1,270 | 4.01 |

==== Ward 2 ====
| Candidate | Vote | % |
|---|---|---|
| Joe Magliocca (X) | 11,828 | 49.39 |
| Jennifer Wyness | 8,677 | 36.23 |
| Christopher Maitland | 2,351 | 9.82 |
| George Georgeou | 1,091 | 4.56 |

==== Ward 3 ====
| Candidate | Vote | % |
|---|---|---|
| Jyoti Gondek | 7,745 | 41.97 |
| Ian McAnerin | 4,867 | 26.37 |
| Jun Lin | 4,747 | 25.72 |
| Connie Hamilton | 1,096 | 5.94 |

==== Ward 4 ====
| Candidate | Vote | % |
|---|---|---|
| Sean Chu (X) | 16,327 | 48.42 |
| Greg Miller | 13,965 | 41.41 |
| Blair Berdusco | 2,875 | 8.53 |
| Srini Ganti | 554 | 1.64 |

==== Ward 5 ====
| Candidate | Vote | % |
|---|---|---|
| George Chahal | 6,608 | 40.61 |
| Aryan Sadat | 3,759 | 23.10 |
| Preet Baidwan | 2,332 | 14.33 |
| Raj Nijjar | 1,698 | 10.44 |
| Tudor Dinca | 1,528 | 9.39 |
| Hirde Paul Jassal | 346 | 2.13 |

==== Ward 6 ====
| Candidate | Vote | % |
|---|---|---|
| Jeff Davison | 13,735 | 44.72 |
| Esmahan Razavi | 6,605 | 21.51 |
| Sean Yost | 2,507 | 8.16 |
| Jeffrey Michael Brownridge | 2,427 | 7.90 |
| Alex Columbos | 1,961 | 6.38 |
| Grace Nelson | 1,376 | 4.48 |
| Sanjeev Kad | 1,076 | 3.50 |
| Steve Turner | 1,026 | 3.34 |

==== Ward 7 ====
| Candidate | Vote | % |
|---|---|---|
| Druh Farrell (X) | 9,753 | 41.03 |
| Brent Alexander | 8,916 | 37.51 |
| Dean Brawn | 2,882 | 12.12 |
| Margot Aftergood | 1,765 | 7.42 |
| Marek Hejduk | 456 | 1.92 |

==== Ward 8 ====
| Candidate | Vote | % |
|---|---|---|
| Evan Woolley (X) | 15,838 | 58.28 |
| Chris Davis | 8,844 | 32.54 |
| Karla Charest | 1,839 | 6.77 |
| Carter Thomson | 657 | 2.42 |

==== Ward 9 ====
| Candidate | Vote | % |
|---|---|---|
| Gian-Carlo Carra (X) | 9,760 | 45.31 |
| Cheryl Link | 8,065 | 37.44 |
| Trevor Buckler | 1,126 | 5.23 |
| David Christopher Metclafe | 991 | 4.60 |
| Cesar Augusto Saavedra | 589 | 2.73 |
| Boss Madimba | 526 | 2.44 |
| Omar M'Keyo | 483 | 2.24 |

==== Ward 10 ====
| Candidate | Vote | % |
|---|---|---|
| Ray Jones (X) | 7,240 | 35.53 |
| David Winkler | 5,512 | 27.05 |
| Salimah Kassam | 2,126 | 10.43 |
| Michelle Rae Robinson | 1,258 | 6.17 |
| Najeeb Butt | 1,054 | 5.17 |
| Gar Gar | 864 | 4.24 |
| Issa Mosa | 693 | 3.40 |
| Kamilla Prasad | 619 | 3.04 |
| Faith Greaves | 568 | 2.79 |
| Hermann Muller | 367 | 1.80 |
| Numan Elhussein | 78 | 0.38 |

==== Ward 11 ====
| Candidate | Vote | % |
|---|---|---|
| Jeromy Farkas | 13,169 | 38.39 |
| Linda Johnson | 7,588 | 22.12 |
| Janet Eremenko | 6,889 | 20.08 |
| Robert Dickinson | 4,446 | 12.96 |
| Keith Simmons | 2,214 | 6.45 |

==== Ward 12 ====
| Candidate | Vote | % |
|---|---|---|
| Shane Keating (X) | 17,923 | 72.79 |
| Teresa Hargreaves | 2,844 | 11.55 |
| Brad Cunningham | 2,732 | 11.10 |
| Mackenzie Quigley | 1,123 | 4.56 |

==== Ward 13 ====
| Candidate | Vote | % |
|---|---|---|
| Diane Colley-Urquhart (X) | 9,117 | 34.23 |
| Mark Dyrholm | 4,427 | 16.62 |
| Art Johnston | 3,747 | 14.07 |
| Sherrisa Celis | 2,959 | 11.11 |
| Adam Boechler | 2,909 | 10.92 |
| Adam W. Frisch | 2,732 | 10.26 |
| Kay Adeniyi | 745 | 2.80 |

==== Ward 14 ====
| Candidate | Vote | % |
|---|---|---|
| Peter Demong (X) | 28,430 | 90.27 |
| Kelash Kumar | 3,064 | 9.73 |

== Issues ==
=== Campaign finance transparency ===
According to a 2013 Calgary Herald article, campaign finance transparency had become a topic of interest with most candidates making their donor lists available before the election. One veteran candidate who raised $78,000 in contributions in the 2010 election preferred to file according to legal requirements by filing disclosure of donations with city hall at the end of the year. By late summer 2017, campaign finance transparency was an issue again with the establishment of a political action committee (PAC), a third-party organization that is not required to reveal the identity of its donors. PACS are commonly used in the United States to pool campaign contributions to target candidates. Hadyn Place, Director of Alberta Can't Wait—one of Alberta's "unite the right" movement organizations—explained to CBC journalists that Save Calgary is targeting incumbents Mayor Naheed Nenshi, and councillors Druh Farrell, Evan Woolley, Gian-Carlo Carra, Diane Colley-Urquhart because "We feel that there are good candidates running against those current city councillors and we don't like their voting records, and their priorities, we feel, are out of step with everyday Calgarians' priorities."

CBC News likened Calgary's "relatively lawless" finance rules for municipal elections, to the "wild west". Municipal government election candidates can accept donations from corporations, unions and individuals and there is "no cap on how much candidates can spend". This contrasts with federal and provincial elections where candidates are not allowed to accept corporate and union donations. At the federal level, candidates face a hard cap on campaign spending based on the size of their riding, and the laws are strictly enforced. According to Alberta Municipal Affairs, the Alberta government of plans to add amendments to existing municipal elections laws, possibly in 2018. as early as next year. Jack Lucas, a professor of political science at the University of Calgary told CBC News that Alberta will "likely curb donation limits and put a cap on campaign spending". Lucas said, "Clearer disclosure rules for third-party advertising would make third-party campaigns like Save Calgary more transparent and less controversial."

== Sources ==
- "Official Results". calgary.ca. City of Calgary. Archived from the original on December 30, 2017.
