= 2010 Calgary municipal election =

Canadian municipal election in Alberta

- October 18, 2010

Mayor and 14 aldermen to Calgary City Council
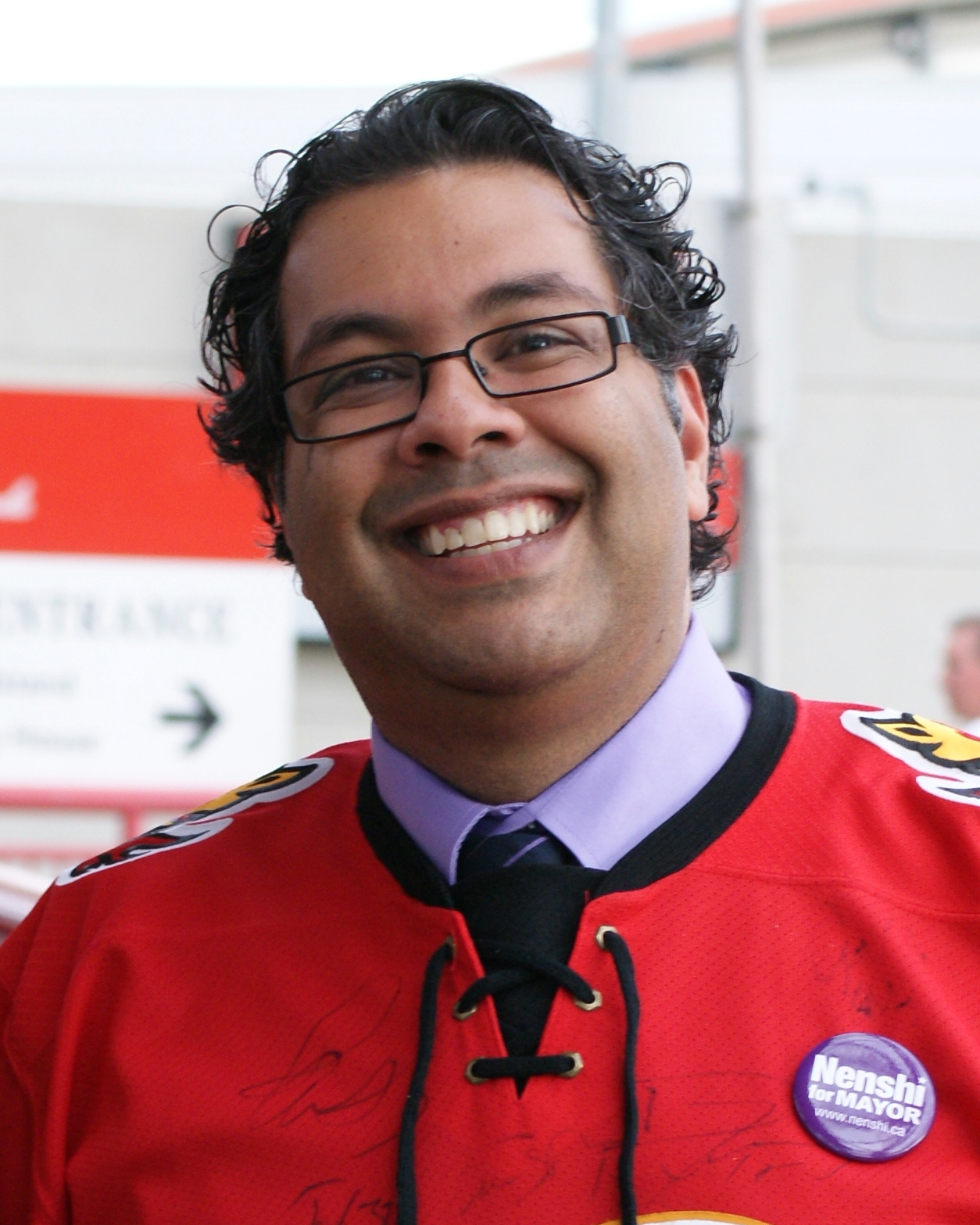

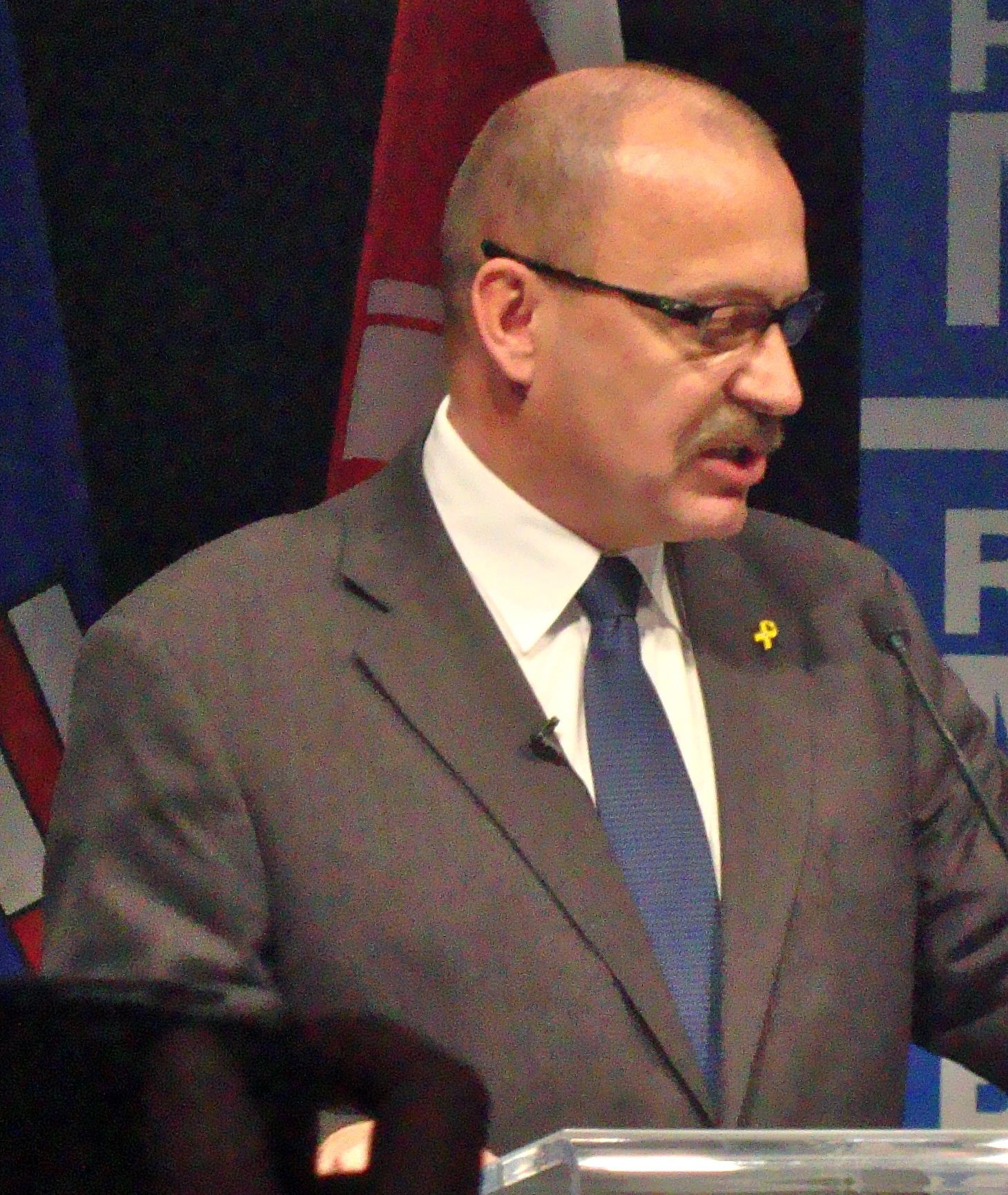

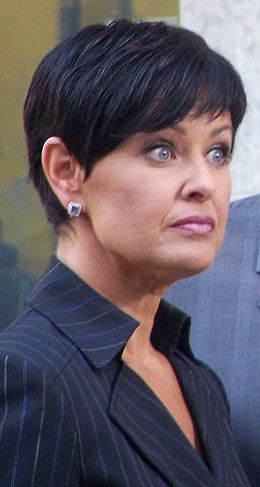
Candidate	Naheed Nenshi	Ric McIver	Barb Higgins
Popular vote	140,263	112,386	91,359
Percentage	39.6%	31.7%	25.8%
- Results of the City Council election
Mayor before election
Dave Bronconnier
Elected mayor
Naheed Nenshi

The 2010 Calgary municipal election was held Monday, October 18, 2010, to elect a mayor and 14 aldermen to the city council, the seven trustees to the Calgary School District (each representing 2 of 14 wards), and four of the seven trustees to the Calgary Catholic School District (each representing 2 of 14 wards). Three incumbent separate school trustees had no challengers. A new mayor was to be elected, as the three term incumbent Dave Bronconnier did not seek re-election. Since 1968, provincial legislation has required every municipality to hold triennial elections.

The voter turnout was 53%, a significant increase from previous elections.

== Results ==
Bold indicates elected, italics indicates incumbent, and asterisk indicates withdrew from race.

=== Mayor ===
Mayor
Candidate	Votes	%
**Naheed K. Nenshi**	140,263	39.6
Ric McIver	112,386	31.7
Barb Higgins	91,359	25.8
Joe Connelly	2,484	0.7
Bob Hawkesworth*	1,513	0.4
Jon Lord	1,461	0.4
Wayne Stewart*	1,360	0.4
Craig Burrows*	994	0.3
Barry Erskine	672	0.2
Bonnie Devine	329	0.1
Amanda Liu	336	0.1
Sandra Hunter	284	0.1
Dan Knight	262	0.1
Oscar Fech	207	0.1
Gary F. Johnston	180	0.1

=== Aldermen ===
Aldermen
Ward 1			Ward 2			Ward 3			Ward 4		
Candidate	Votes	%	Candidate	Votes	%	Candidate	Votes	%	Candidate	Votes	%
**Dale Hodges**	**12,330**	**41.4**	**Gord Lowe**	**9,232**	**42.7**	**Jim Stevenson**	**10,913**	**61.6**	**Gael Grace MacLeod**	**7,288**	**25.4**
Chris Harper	7,308	24.6	"Joe" Biagio Magliocca	8,210	37.9	Helene Larocque	3,905	22.0	Sean Chu	6,000	20.9
Ric Lockhart	3,820	12.8	Terry Richard Avramenko	3,471	16.0	Pervaiz Iqbal	1,654	9.3	Jane Morgan	3,748	13.1
Judi Vandenbrink	2,996	10.1	Daniel M. Del Re	727	3.4	Gary Duane Tremblay	1,258	7.1	Jon Wong	2,663	9.3
Bill Scott	2,732	9.2	Ward 5			Ward 6			Brad Northcott	2,500	8.7
Norm Perrault	573	1.9	**Ray Jones**	**11,685**	**62.1**	**Richard Pootmans**	**8,107**	**30.6**	Tommy Low	1,668	5.8
Ward 7			Jay Bal	2,861	15.7	John Yannitsos	3,931	14.9	Leslie Bedard	1,589	5.5
**Druh Farrell**	**11,910**	**42.9**	Beena Ashar	2,323	12.3	Brent Mielke	3,377	12.8	Dwight Larry Boehm	1,020	3.6
Kevin Taylor	10,658	38.4	Robert J. Guizzo	1,949	10.4	Ken Rogers	3,364	12.7	Carol Poon	860	3.0
Jim Pilling	2,621	9.4	Ward 8			Randy Royer	3,111	11.8	Jeff Haussecker	758	2.6
Elizabeth Ann Cook	1,367	4.9	**John Mar**	**11,630**	**52.7**	Tom Malyszko	2,369	9.0	Curtis Kruschel	593	2.1
Michael Krisko	1,204	4.3	Zakary Pashak	9,079	41.1	Coral Turner	977	3.7	Ward 9		
Ward 10			David Lapp	830	3.8	Robert Wills	885	3.3	**Gian-Carlo Carra**	**7,850**	**31.0**
**Andre Chabot**	**13,042**	**77.8**	Antoni Grochowski	546	2.5	Rad Dimic	176	0.7	Mike Pal	7,355	29.0
Robert Kennish	1,698	10.1	Ward 11			Henry Sims	164	0.6	Jeremy Pat Nixon	4,814	19.0
Nargis Dossa	1,214	7.2	**Brian Pincott**	**10,834**	**35.1**	Ward 12			Stephen Chapman	2,944	11.6
Karl Schackwidt	820	4.9	James Maxim	9,385	30.4	**Shane Keating**	**9,270**	**42.4**	Stan (The Man) Waciak	905	3.6
Ward 13			Ernest Stephen McCutcheon	3,309	11	Al Browne	6,886	31.5	Petra Clemens	718	2.8
**Diane Marie Colley-Urquhart**	**12,901**	**52.6**	Olga Knight	3,736	13	Roger Crowe	4,433	20.3	Henry Charles Hollinger	543	2.1
Sandy Jenkins	7,119	29.0	Wayne E. Frisch	2,466	8.0	Benjamin G. Sim	663	3.0	Adam Vase	221	0.9
Andrew Rodych	2,635	10.7	Ward 14			Rory Rotzoll	588	2.7			
Trevor Hodge	1,865	7.6	**Peter Demong**	**8,483**	**29.2**						
			Richard Dur	7,188	24.8						
			Shawn Chiping Kao	5,647	19.5						
			Linda Fox-Mellway	5,187	17.9						
			Ken Gerelus	1,324	4.6						
			Billy (The Butcher) Tummonds	1,201	4.1						

=== Public school trustees ===
Calgary School District
Ward 1/2			Ward 3/4			Ward 5/10		
Candidate	Votes	%	Candidate	Votes	%	Candidate	Votes	%
**Joy Bowen-Eyre**	**5,732**	**19.2**	**Lynn C. Ferguson**	**24,461**	**83.5**	**Pamela King**	**11,075**	**47.8**
Michael Gretton	5,308	17.8	Tanveer Taj	4,845	16.5	Ryan J. White	3,307	14.3
Trina Hurdman	5,065	16.9				Rick Rowan	3,162	13.7
Roberta McDonald	4,364	14.6				Shahzad Ashraf	2,826	12.2
Jawad Durrani	4,336	14.5				Amarjot Mangat	2,787	12.0
Josh Traptow	3,549	11.9	Ward 6/7			Ward 8/9		
Jaret Kneller	1,546	5.2	**George S. Lane**	**14,575**	**44.9**	**Pat Cochrane**	**15,226**	**52.5**
Ward 11/13			Carole Oliver	14,392	44.3	Laura Shutiak	13,784	47.5
**Sheila Taylor**	**6,817**	**21.6**	Lenore Indarsingh	3,499	10.8	Ward 12/14		
Catherine Heggerud	5,538	17.5				**Carol Bazinet**	**13,766**	**46.0**
Julie Kearns	4,711	14.9				Malik Amery	8,237	27.5
Sue Styles	3,155	10.0				Wendi Ann Moore	7,912	26.4
Helen Mowat	2,885	9.1						
Victor Lough	2,809	8.9						
Andrea Guinn	2,631	8.3						
Larry R. Heather	1,577	5.0						
Sarah Baehl de Lescure	1,463	4.6						

=== Separate school trustees ===
Calgary Catholic School District
Ward 1/2/Cochrane			Ward 3/5/Airdrie			Ward 4/7		
Candidate	Votes	%	Candidate	Votes	%	Candidate	Votes	%
**Serafino Scarpino**	**Acclaimed**		**Linda Wellman**	**7,784**	**76.8**	**Marge Belcourt**	**6,224**	**58.6**
Ward 6/8			Rofina Groebmair	2,352	23.2	Anne Engel	4,398	41.4
**Lois Burke-Gaffney**	**6,095**	**67.7**	Ward 9/10/Chestermere			Ward 11/12		
Antoni Grochowski	2,909	32.3	**Rosemarie Ann Goerlitz**	**Acclaimed**		**Catherine Williams**	**4,918**	**42.4**
Ward 13/14						Kim VanKosh	3,557	30.7
**Mary Louise Martin**	**Acclaimed**					Michael Annuik	3,111	26.9

== Candidate summaries ==
=== Mayor ===
- Craig Burrows - Former Ward 6 alderman, withdrew from the race on October 14 to back Ric McIver, but still appeared on the ballot.
- Joe Connelly - Alderman incumbent to Ward 6.
- Bonnie Devine - Previous Communist candidate for Calgary-East MLA.
- Barry Erskine - Former alderman, and host of Let's Talk Gardening on AM 770 CHQR.
- Oscar Fech - Ran for mayor in 2001 and 2004 elections.
- Bob Hawkesworth - Alderman incumbent to Ward 4, withdrew from the race on October 13 to back Barb Higgins, but still appeared on the ballot.
- Barb Higgins - Former news anchor at CTV Calgary.
- Sandra Hunter -
- Gary F. Johnston - Retired rail worker, blind.
- Dan Knight -
- Amanda Liu -
- Jon Lord - Former MLA and alderman.
- Ric McIver - Alderman incumbent to Ward 12.
- Naheed K. Nenshi - Served on the leadership team of imagineCalgary.
- Wayne Stewart - Former president and CEO of the Calgary Homeless Foundation, withdrew from the race on October 14 to back Naheed Nenshi, but still appeared on the ballot.

== See also ==
- List of Calgary municipal elections
