= 2013 Calgary municipal election =

Election in Alberta, Canada

- October 21, 2013

Mayor and 14 councillors to Calgary City Council
- Turnout: 30.28%
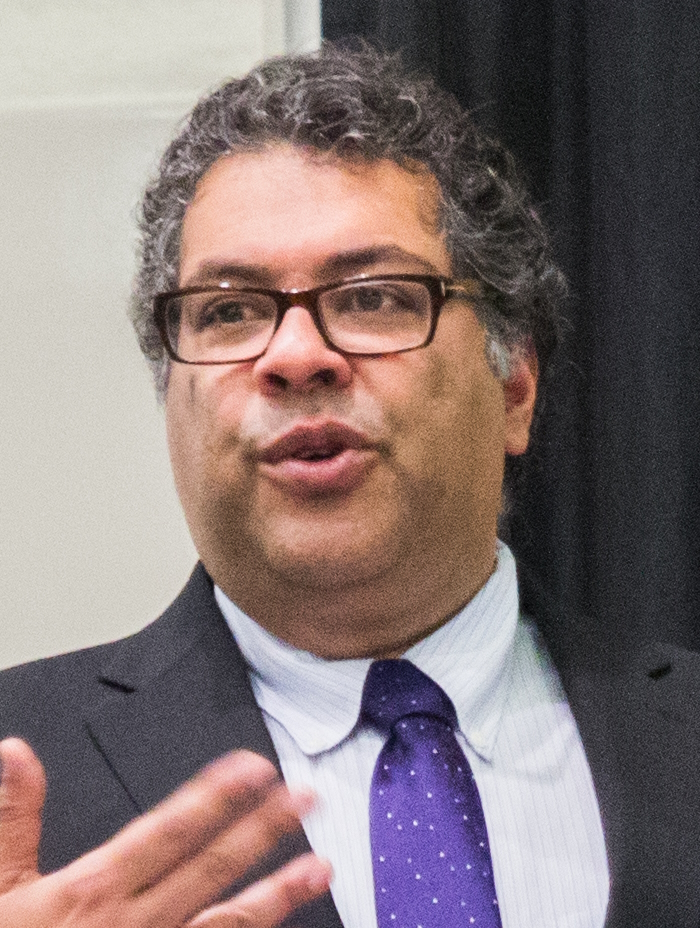

Candidate	Naheed Nenshi	Jon Lord
Popular vote	193,393	56,226
Percentage	73.6%	21.4%
- Results of the City Council election
Mayor before election
Naheed Nenshi
Elected mayor
Naheed Nenshi

The 2013 Calgary municipal election was held Monday, October 21, 2013, to elect a mayor and 14 councillors to the city council, the seven trustees to the Calgary School District (each representing two of 14 wards), and five of the seven trustees to the Calgary Catholic School District (each representing two of 14 wards).

Two incumbent separate school trustees had no challengers.

From 1968 to 2013, provincial legislation required every municipality to hold elections every three years. The 28th Alberta Legislature introduced the Election Accountability Amendment Act (Bill 7) which among other reforms to provincial and municipal elections, amended the Local Authorities Election Act to extend the terms of local authorities including municipalities and school boards from three years to four years.

The 14 electoral wards were once again each represented by a single member on council, although the wards were changed slightly from the previous term. The neighbourhood of Martindale was moved from ward 3 to ward 5, and the community that expanded the neighbourhood of Cougar Ridge into ward 1 was with the rest of the neighbourhood in ward 6. This election also marked a change in title for council members from "Alderman" to "Councillor".

Naheed K. Nenshi was elected mayor with a large majority of votes cast.

== Candidates ==
Bold indicates elected, italics indicates incumbent.

=== Mayor ===
Mayor
Candidate	Votes	%
**Naheed K. Nenshi**	**193,393**	**73.6**
Jon Lord	56,226	21.4
Sandra Hunter	4,181	1.6
Carter Thomson	3,157	1.2
Larry R. Heather	1,857	0.7
Bruce Jackman	1,397	0.5
Norm Perrault	1,117	0.4
Jonathan Joseph Sunstrum	775	0.3
Milan Papez	492	0.2

- Larry Heather - Christian radio show host
- Jon Lord - former PC MLA
- Alex Morozov
- Naheed Nenshi - incumbent
- Milan Papez Sr. - salesman
- Norm Perrault
- Carter Thomson - store owner

=== Ward 1 ===

Ward 1
Candidate	Votes	%
**Ward Sutherland**	**8,721**	**39.0**
Chris Harper	8,635	38.6
Judi Vandenbrink	3,891	17.4
John Hilton-O'Brien	726	3.2
Dan Larabie	378	1.7

- Chris Harper
- Dan Larabie
- John Hilton O'Brian
- Ward Sutherland
- Judi Vandenbrink

=== Ward 2 ===

Ward 2
Candidate	Votes	%
**Joe Magliocca**	**5,437**	**32.7**
Shawn Douglas Ripley	3,546	21.3
Bernie Dowhan	3,391	20.4
Terry Wong	2,940	17.7
Richard Poon	1,306	7.9

- Bernie Dowhan - teacher
- Joe Magliocca
- Terry Wong
- Shawn Ripley - planning consultant

=== Ward 3 ===

Ward 3
Candidate	Votes	%
**Jim Stevenson**	**9,424**	**81.0**
Tanveer Taj	2,217	19.0

- Jim Stevenson - incumbent

=== Ward 4 ===

Ward 4
Candidate	Votes	%
**Sean Chu**	**9,017**	**42.7**
Gael MacLeod	8,370	39.6
Blair Houston	2,440	11.6
Michael David Hartford	1,138	5.4
Yuri Shterngartz	158	0.7

- Sean Chu
- Michael Hartford
- Blair Houston
- Gael MacLeod - incumbent

=== Ward 5 ===

Ward 5
Candidate	Votes	%
**Ray Jones**	**9,775**	**73.0**
Bev Hearn	1,911	14.3
Pritpal Dhaliwal	1,696	12.7

- Ray Jones - incumbent

=== Ward 6 ===

Ward 6
Candidate	Votes	%
**Richard Pootmans**	**10,843**	**51.3**
Joe Connelly	7,716	36.5
Bob Bowles	2,170	10.3
James Donald Istvanffy	410	1.9

- Robert Bowles
- Richard Pootmans - incumbent

=== Ward 7 ===

Ward 7
Candidate	Votes	%
**Druh Farrell**	**8,923**	**37.5**
Kevin Taylor	6,600	27.7
Brent Alexander	6,299	26.5
Joylin Nodwell	1,988	8.3

- Brent Alexander - financial manager
- Druh Farrell - incumbent
- Joylin Nodwell
- Kevin Taylor

=== Ward 8 ===

Ward 8
Candidate	Votes	%
**Evan Woolley**	**9,377**	**51.1**
John Mar	7,909	43.1
Ian Newman	1,066	5.8

- John Mar - incumbent
- Ian Newman - company manager
- Evan Woolley

=== Ward 9 ===

Ward 9
Candidate	Votes	%
**Gian-Carlo Carra**	**9,220**	**48.2**
Jordan Katz	4,884	25.5
Richard Wilkie	4,037	21.1
Stan The Man Waciak	632	3.3
Darwin Lahue	347	1.8

- Gian-Carlo Carra - incumbent
- Jordan Katz
- Richard Wilkie

=== Ward 10 ===

Ward 10
Candidate	Votes	%
**Andre Chabot**	**9,654**	**86.4**
Nargis Dossa	906	8.1
Numan Elhussein	608	5.4

- Andre Chabot - incumbent
- Nargis Dossa

=== Ward 11 ===

Ward 11
Candidate	Votes	%
**Brian Pincott**	**11,075**	**47.7**
James Maxim	9,798	42.2
Wayne Frisch	2,334	10.1

- Wayne Frisch
- James Maxim
- Brian Pincott - incumbent

=== Ward 12 ===

Ward 12
Candidate	Votes	%
**Shane Keating**	**11,942**	**71.5**
Stephanie Kusie	4,766	28.5

- Shane Keating - incumbent

=== Ward 13 ===

Ward 13
Candidate	Votes	%
**Diane Marie Colley-Urquhart**	**9,432**	**53.1**
Scott Sorokoski	4,851	27.3
Adam W. Frisch	3,492	19.6

- Diane Colley-Urquhart - incumbent
- Adam Frisch
- Scott Sorokoski

=== Ward 14 ===

Ward 14
Candidate	Votes	%
**Peter Demong**	**13,974**	**67.1**
Shawn Kao	6,851	32.9

- Peter Demong - incumbent
- Shawn Kao

=== Public school trustees ===
Calgary School District
Candidate	Votes	%
Ward 1/2
**Joy Bowen-Eyre**	**11,246**	**47.0**
Roberta Maclise McDonald	6,548	27.3
Erin Stabbler	6,151	25.7
Ward 3/4
**Lynn Cameron Ferguson**	**10,444**	**48.3**
Rick Lundy	8,209	38.0
Wilf Phillips	2,960	13.7
Ward 5/10
**Pamela King**	**7,677**	**44.7**
Larry Leach	6,637	38.7
A. Najeeb Butt	2,848	16.1
Ward 6/7
**Trina Hurdman**	**14,877**	**51.7**
George S. Lane	9,681	33.6
Misty Hamel	4,220	14.7
Ward 8/9
**Judy Hehr**	**15,983**	**66.5**
Steve Chapman	6,051	25.2
Irina Kuperis	1,302	5.4
Steven Urvald	694	2.9
Ward 11/13
**Sheila Taylor**	**20,775**	**79.3**
Randy Sweet	5,433	20.7
Ward 12/14
**Amber Stewart**	**6693**	**28.6**
Malik Amery	5224	22.3
Christina Brewerton Steed	3883	16.6
Greg Humphreys	3577	15.3
Todd Neuman	2841	12.1
Helen Mowat	1167	5.0

=== Separate school trustees ===
Calgary Catholic School District
Candidate	Votes	%
Ward 1/2/Cochrane
**Serafino Scarpino**	**5,067**	**51.7**
Torr Haglund	2,493	25.4
Myra D'Souza Kormann	2,240	22.9
Ward 3/5/Airdrie
**Linda Wellman**	**Acclaimed**	
Ward 4/7
**Margaret Belcourt**	**6,287**	**75.7**
Emmerson Brando	2,021	24.3
Ward 6/8
**Peter Teppler**	**3,571**	**51.3**
Mark Franssen	1,919	27.6
Antoni Grochowski	1,467	21.1
Ward 9/10/Chestermere
**Cheryl Low**	**4955**	**71.0**
Brad Gaida	2020	29.0
Ward 11/12
**Cathie Williams**	**Acclaimed**	
Ward 13/14
**Mary Louise Martin**	**8043**	**78.9**
John Stephen Vyboh	2145	21.1

== Mayoral opinion polling ==
Polling firm	Date	Naheed Nenshi	Jon Lord	Other	Sample size	Polling method
Insights West	October 17–18, 2013	71	20	Other 9%	420	online
Leger Marketing	October 11–14, 2013	81	15	Sandra Hunter, Bruce Jackman, and Carter Thomson 3%	526	online

== See also ==
- List of Calgary municipal elections
- Calgary City Council
