= Druh Farrell =

Canadian politician (born 1958 or 1959)

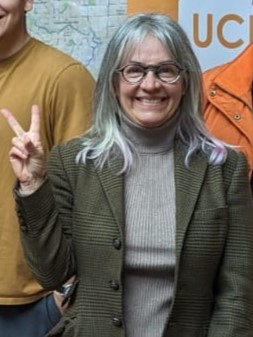
- Farrell in 2023

City of Calgary Councillor for Ward 7
- In office October 2001 – October 25, 2021
- Preceded by: Bev Longstaff
- Succeeded by: Terry Wong

Personal details
- Born: 1958 or 1959 (age 67–68) Calgary, Alberta, Canada
- Party: New Democratic
- Education: Form and Function Design Academy

Druh Farrell (born 1958 or 1959) is a municipal politician who formerly served as Councillor for Ward 7 in Calgary, Alberta. She was first elected in 2001.

== Career before politics ==
Prior to being elected in 2001, Farrell was a fashion designer and clothing manufacturer, and served as board member of the Hillhurst-Sunnyside Community Association and chair of the Hillhurst Sunnyside Planning and Development committee, co-founder and chairwoman of the Inner-City Coalition, and manager of the Kensington Business Revitalization Zone Association.

== Electoral record ==
=== 2001 Calgary municipal election ===
Ward 7
Candidate	Votes	Percent
Druh Farrell	7,687	44.4%
Augustine Joseph Barron	3,565	20.6%
Margot Aftergood	2,079	12.0%
Kendrick L. Charles	1,733	10.0%
Harvey Cohen	1,214	7.0%
Jon Adams	743	4.3%
Wyatt-James Taylor McIntyre	289	1.7%

=== 2004 Calgary municipal election ===
Farrell was reelected to serve Ward 7 in 2004 for a 3-year term by acclamation, having run unopposed.

=== 2007 Calgary municipal election ===
Ward 7
Candidate	Votes	Percent
Druh Farrell	8,998	68.9%
Barry Elridge	2,249	17.2%
Merle Terlesky	1,280	9.8%
Jag Aithal	532	4.1%

=== 2010 Calgary municipal election ===
Ward 7
Candidate	Votes	Percent
Druh Farrell	11,910	42.9%
Kevin Taylor	10,658	38.4%
Jim Pilling	2,621	9.4%
Elizabeth Ann Cook	1,367	4.9%
Michael Krisko	1,204	4.3%

=== 2013 Calgary municipal election ===
Ward 7
Candidate	Votes	Percent
Druh Farrell	8,923	37.5%
Kevin Taylor	6,600	27.7%
Brent Alexander	6,299	26.5%
Joylin Nodwell	1,988	8.3%

=== 2017 Calgary municipal election ===
Ward 7
Candidate	Votes	Percent
Druh Farrell	9,753	41.0%
Brent Alexander	8,916	37.5%
Dean Brawn	2,882	12.1%
Margot Aftergood	1,765	7.4%
Marek Hejduk	456	1.9%

=== 2021 Calgary municipal election ===
On February 22, 2021, Farrell announced she would not be running for reelection in the 2021 Calgary municipal election.

=== 31st Alberta general election ===
After controversy alleging party officials' bias towards Farrell, on May 13, 2022, Farell won the nomination to become the Alberta NDP candidate for Calgary-Bow in the 2023 Alberta general election.

2023 Alberta general election: Calgary-Bow
Party	Candidate	Votes	%	±%
United Conservative	Demetrios Nicolaides	13,175	49.74	-6.15
New Democratic	Druh Farrell	12,552	47.39	+13.23
Alberta Party	Paul Godard	670	2.53	-4.56
Solidarity Movement	Manuel Santos	89	0.34	–
Total		26,486	99.29	–
Rejected and declined		190	0.71	
Turnout		26,676	66.43	
Eligible voters		40,159		
United Conservative hold		Swing		-9.69
Source(s) Source: Elections Alberta

== Tenure as city councillor ==
=== Peace Bridge ===
The $24.5-million Peace Bridge designed by Santiago Calatrava on the Bow River between Eau Claire and Sunnyside, was a "controversial" project from its onset with many people considering it to be an "unnecessary extravagance." Farrell was a vocal supporter of the footbridge and as a result she "became the human shield at which many strangers directed their intense anger." On March 24, 2012, "thousands of Calgarians flooded onto the [bridge] to celebrate its opening." About 6,000 people use it daily. It quickly became a "tourist magnet"−the "most photographed structure in Calgary". It ranked among the top ten architectural projects and public spaces of 2012.

=== Walk21 Microgrants ===
The $172,500 Walk21 Community Microgrants Council Innovation Fund Application created by Farrell, Gian-Carlo Carra and Brian Pincott was approved by City Council on April 10, 2017. The program, which coincides with an international conference on walking hosted at the University of Calgary in September, will provide $112,500 for about 150 walking improvement community projects, which is about eight per ward to be completed by 2020. It celebrates Canada's 150th birthday. Photos of the arching rainbow under the LRT bridge by Kensington's Riley Park, one of the Walk21 Microgrants projects, were widely shared on Instagram.

=== Aquatic wheel chairs pilot project ===
Calgary's Parks Department purchased three "water-hardy wheelchairs" which are currently available at Canmore, Rotary and South Glenmore/Variety splash parks as part of their accessibility initiative. Farrell had suggested the idea to Parks after she had heard about aquatic wheel chairs in an American water park.

=== Terrigno Lawsuit ===
In May 2017, the Terrigno family served Farrell with a lawsuit related to a 2015 failed land use rezoning application regarding their building after City Councillors voted to reject their application on May 11, 2015 The lawsuit alleged that Farrell used her position and power to kill the proposed development which was less than 100 meters from her home. In June 2017, Farrell filed a statement of defence, saying the lawsuit is intended to injure her reputation ahead of the October 2017 municipal election. The case and two appeals were all dismissed.

=== Vote Against New Communities ===
Along with Mayor Naheed Nenshi, Farrell was the only councillor to vote against a proposal for 14 new edge communities in July 2018.

=== Opposition from Save Calgary PAC ===
Farrell is one of five incumbents in the October 2017 Calgary elections, targeted with negative publicity by the newly formed Save Calgary political action committee (PAC), who also target councillors Gian-Carlo Carra, Diane Colley-Urquhart, Evan Woolley and Mayor Naheed Nenshi.
