= Larry R. Heather =

Canadian politician

- Born: 1953 (age 72–73); Vulcan, Alberta, Canada
- Education: Briercrest College and Seminary
- Political party: Christian Heritage Party
- Website: www.larryforheritage.ca

Larry R. Heather (born 1953) is a perennial candidate from Calgary, Alberta, Canada. In addition to running as an independent at all three levels of government, he has run as a Christian Heritage Party of Canada candidate in federal elections and an Alberta Social Credit Party candidate in provincial elections.

== Personal life ==
Heather holds a Bachelor of Religious Education degree from Briercrest Bible College in Saskatchewan, a Bachelor of Arts degree in Religion from Rocky Mountain College, and a Graduate Certificate of Christian Studies from Regent College in Vancouver, British Columbia. A shipper/receiver and audio editor by profession, he was a member and performer in the Canadian Badlands Passion Play Society and a member of the Creation Science Association of Alberta. Heather previously hosted the radio program "Gospel Road" on CHRB in High River. He has lived in the electoral district Calgary-Heritage since 1963. He is a director with the William Aberhart Historical Foundation started by former Alberta Social Credit Speaker of the House, Arthur J. Dixon.

== Political career ==
Heather is best known as an anti-abortion activist. He was briefly detained in 1985 for throwing ketchup on abortion activist Henry Morgentaler, upon the latter's arrival in Calgary on a fundraising tour. He later protested against funding for the Calgary Birth Control Association in 1988, on the grounds that the organization provided abortion counselling. A few months after the Supreme Court of Canada struck down the nation's abortion law, he was quoted as saying, "a woman's womb is the most dangerous place to live in Canada". During a debate over a Calgary abortion clinic in 1991, he described Morgentaler as "a mass murderer who has murdered thousands of unborn babies".

He has also been active in other socially conservative causes. During the 1989 municipal campaign, he described a local gay bar as a "major public health threat" and claimed that condoms in washroom coin machines would result in a "flood of promiscuity". In 2005, he criticized Conservative Party leader Stephen Harper for supporting civil union rights for homosexual couples.

Heather is a member of Cedars of Lebanon Reforestation (CoL), a group which believes that the growth of cedars in Lebanon and Israel will signal the return of the Christian Messiah. He spoke in defense of fellow CoL member Bruce Balfour in 2003, upon the latter's arrest by Lebanese authorities on charges of spying for Israel. The charges were not proven, and Balfour was released.

As of 2007, he was the 2nd vice-president of communication of the Alberta Social Credit Party. Heather is a Conservative Baptist, and for many years was president of Christians Concerned For Life in Calgary. He has also written and performed gospel songs and is a playwright with three produced two-act dramas, including a Messianic Hanukkah Musical Tree of Light.

One of his campaign documents in 2006 featured the headline, "Purge Supreme Court Activist Rulings!", accompanied by the image of a judge smashing his gavel on a husband-and-wife centerpiece. This was a reference to the recent legalization of same-sex marriage in Canada. His campaign website also featured images of aborted fetuses, which are juxtaposed with and likened to images of massacred children in Rwanda.

In October 2007, he entered the campaign for the leadership of the Social Credit Party of Alberta. He lost to Len Skowronski in a vote in Red Deer on November 3, 2007. He ran for public school trustee in Calgary in 2010 and documented that election on his post-election website. Protesting a change in membership standards in the Christian Heritage Party, he ran in his home riding of Calgary Southwest as an independent in 2011.

He was a candidate for Mayor for the 2013 Calgary municipal elections and received 0.7 percent of the popular vote, coming in fifth out of nine candidates. He is a City Hall attender and frequent presenter from the public at both the committee level and Council public hearings.

In the 2015 Alberta provincial election he was a Social Credit candidate in Calgary Elbow against Education Minister incumbent Gordon Dirks.

In the 2015 federal election he ran in the electoral district of Calgary Heritage as an Independent candidate, his sixth time on the ballot against Stephen Harper. In the 2016 provincial by-election for Calgary-Greenway, he ran as an independent candidate.

On November 7, 2016, Heather was banned from Calgary City Hall for a period of two years due to his behaviour while speaking to council regarding a rezoning issue. Heather opposed all applications for secondary suites, even in communities where he did not live, and was often off-topic while addressing issues. He refused to leave the podium after his 5 minutes of allotted time was up, the same that is granted all speakers, and remained at the podium until he was forced to leave by Calgary Police Service officers.

In 2017, Heather ran for Mayor of Calgary, however his results were lower than his previous attempt. His votes received dropped from 1% total vote down to 0.2%. On December 14, 2017, he also challenged United Conservative Party leader Jason Kenney in the Calgary-Lougheed by-election and came last with 22 votes.

In 2019 Heather ran again, this time provincially. He again finished in last place but managed to more to increase his votes from his previous effort by 32 and increase his percentage of the votes earned by 0.1%.

Heather made a 2nd attempt at public office in 2019 but the results were the same as many of his previous loses. Last place and less than a half a percent of the public vote. In fact this was a step back from his last attempt at Federal office. There he had one of his better outings with 0.9% achieved. This latest lost saw him fall back 0.6% in the popular vote.

He was a candidate in the 2023 Calgary Heritage federal by-election.

== Electoral activity ==
Electoral record
Election	Division	Party	Votes	%	Place	Winner
1984 federal	Calgary South	Ind.	800		5/6	Bobbie Sparrow, Progressive Conservative
1986 provincial	Calgary-Glenmore	Ind.	384		4/4	Dianne Mirosh, Progressive Conservative
1988 federal	Calgary Southwest	Ind.	669		5/7	Bobbie Sparrow, Progressive Conservative
1989 provincial	Calgary-Elbow	Ind.	174		4/4	Ralph Klein, Progressive Conservative
1989 municipal (Public School Board)	Wards 12/14	n/a	2,725	10.79	4/6	Ann Craig
1992 municipal (Public School Board)	Wards 11/13	n/a	* 2,121	-	4/4	Peggy Valentine
1993 federal	Calgary West	CHP	116	0.20	8/8	Stephen Harper, Reform
1997 federal	Calgary Southwest	CHP	89		7/7	Preston Manning, Reform
2004 federal	Calgary Southwest	CHP	229	0.44	6/6	Stephen Harper, Conservative
2004 provincial	Calgary-Glenmore	Social Credit	127		6/6	Ron Stevens, Progressive Conservative
2006 federal	Calgary Southwest	CHP	279	0.49	5/5	Stephen Harper, Conservative
2008 federal	Calgary Southwest	CHP	256	0.5%	6/6	Stephen Harper, Conservative
2010 municipal (Public School Board)	Wards 11/13	n/a	1577	5%	8/9	Sheila Taylor
2011 federal	Calgary Southwest	Ind.	303	0.53%	5/5	Stephen Harper, Conservative
2013 municipal	Citywide	n/a	1857	1%	5/9	Naheed Nenshi
2015 provincial	Calgary Elbow	Social Credit	67	0.32%	6/6	Greg Clark, Alberta Party
2015 federal	Calgary Heritage	Independent	114	0.2%	6/8	Stephen Harper, Conservative Party
2016 provincial by-election (March 22)	Calgary-Greenway	Independent	106	1.28%	7/8	Prab Gill, Progressive Conservative
2017 federal by-election (April 3)	Calgary Midnapore	CHP	251	0.90%	5/6	Stephanie Kusie, Conservative
2017 municipal	Citywide	n/a	848	0.2%	7/10	Naheed Nenshi
2017 provincial by-election (December 14)	Calgary-Lougheed	Independent	22	0.2%	7/7	Jason Kenney, United Conservative
2019 provincial	Calgary-Lougheed	Independent	55	0.3%	6/6	Jason Kenney, United Conservative
2019 federal	Calgary Heritage	CHP	185	0.3%	6/6	Bob Benzen, Conservative
2021 federal	Calgary Nose Hill	CHP	169	0.3%	7/9	Michelle Rempel Garner, Conservative
2021 municipal	Citywide	n/a	428	0.11%	20/27	Jyoti Gondek
2023 provincial	Calgary-Acadia	Independent	163	0.72%	4/6	Diana Batten, New Democrat
2023 Federal by-election	Calgary Heritage	CHP	143	0.59%	6/8	Shuv Majumdar, Conservative
2025 federal	Calgary Heritage	CHP	268	0.39%	6/6	Shuv Majumdar, Conservative
2025 municipal	Citywide	Independent	1202	0.34%	8/9	Jeromy Farkas, Independent

The 1989 municipal results are taken from the Calgary Herald of 17 October 1989, with 38 of 44 polls reporting. The 1992 municipal results are taken from the Calgary Herald of 20 October 1992, with 30 of 50 polls reporting. The 2017 municipal results are taken from the Global News of 17 October 2017, with 266 of 266 polls reporting. The 2019 provincial results are taken from the Alberta Election site 59 of 61 polls reporting.
