= Barb Higgins =

Canadian journalist

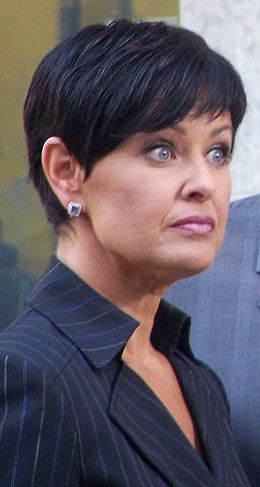
- Born: September 21, 1962 (age 63); Edmonton, Alberta
- Occupation: Journalist
- Years active: 1985–2010
- Spouse(s): Bruce Covernton (former); Brad Moore
- Awards: Best of festival, Canpro / Best New Series, RTNDA
- Website: www.barbhiggins.ca

Barbara Joan Higgins (born September 21, 1962) is best known in Southern Alberta for her 21 year career as senior anchor, writer and producer of the 6 o'clock news for CTV Calgary. After a 26 year career as a journalist, Higgins left her post at CTV in July 2010 to run for public office in the Calgary mayoral election.

== Biography ==
Barbara Joan Higgins was born September 21, 1962, in Edmonton, Alberta. She graduated from Ross Sheppard High School in 1979 and enrolled in Business Administration at NAIT. After two years of study in Business Administration, she transferred to NAIT's Radio and Television Arts. Higgins worked with both CBC and CTV affiliates in Alberta, British Columbia, Manitoba and Saskatchewan. She moved to Calgary in March 1989.

On July 23, 2010, Higgins announced her intention to run as a candidate for mayor in the 2010 Calgary civic election to be held that October. She subsequently described herself as a fiscal conservative with a heart. Her campaign rhetoric focused on setting the tone at City Hall and empowering civic employees to develop solutions to address Calgary's $60-million budget shortfall. Higgins placed third behind Naheed Nenshi and Ric McIver, accumulating over 90,000 votes, just over 25% of the total votes cast.

According to her website, after leaving journalism and politics she works as a wellness counsellor and somatic therapist.

== Awards and honours ==
- Winner of 'Best News Series' from the Radio and Television News Directors Association for her 3-part series on Calgary firefighter Greg McDougal's battle with the Workers Compensation Board.
- Winner of the 'Best of Festival' award at CanPro and winner of 'Most Inspirational' award at the Alberta Motion Picture Industry Association (AMPIA) for her documentary Running on Empty.
- Queen's Diamond Jubilee Award.
- Peter Legge Philanthropy Award.
- UNICEF Volunteer of the Year Award.
- City of Calgary White Hat Award.
- Two time winner of Calgary's Top 40 Under 40
