= Jyoti Gondek =

Canadian politician (born 1969)

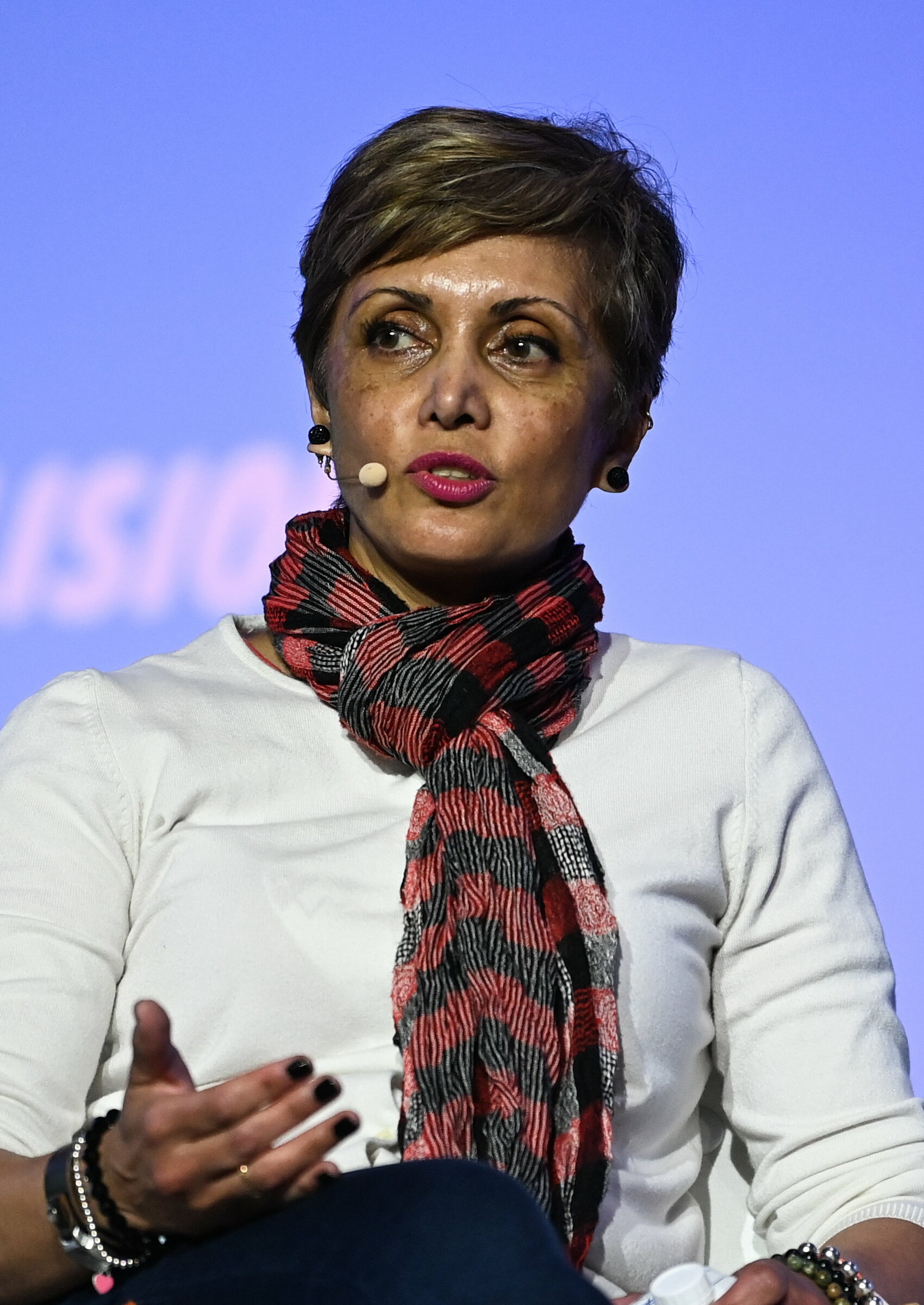
- Gondek in 2022

37th Mayor of Calgary
- In office October 25, 2021 – October 29, 2025
- Preceded by: Naheed Nenshi
- Succeeded by: Jeromy Farkas

City of Calgary Councillor
- In office 2017–2021
- Preceded by: Jim Stevenson
- Succeeded by: Jasmine Mian
- Constituency: Ward 3

Personal details
- Born: Prabhjote Kaur Grewal; 1969 (age 56–57) London, United Kingdom
- Spouse: Todd Gondek (m. 1996)
- Education: University of Manitoba; University of Calgary
- Website: Campaign website

Prabhjote Kaur "Jyoti" Gondek (née Grewal; born 1969) is a Canadian politician who served as the 37th and first female mayor of Calgary from 2021 to 2025. She was defeated in her re-election bid in 2025.

== Early life and education ==
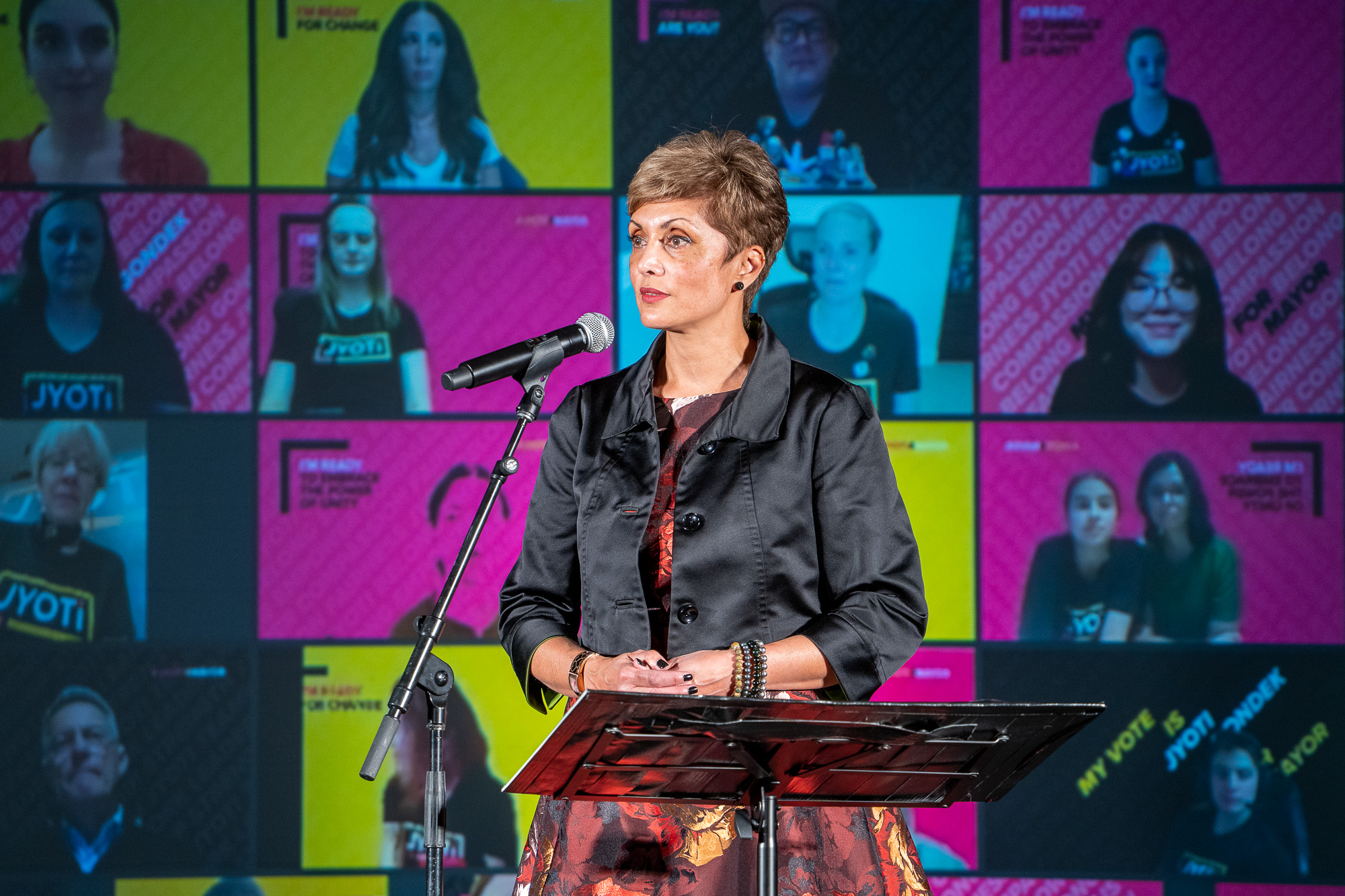
Gondek delivering her victory speech after being elected mayor of Calgary

Born in London, England, Gondek is the daughter of Indian Punjabi Sikh parents Jasdev Singh Grewal, a lawyer, and Surjit Kaur Grewal. She immigrated to Canada with her parents at the age of four, initially settling in Manitoba.

Gondek pursued a bachelor's degree in sociology from the University of Manitoba, where she worked as a policy analyst with the government of Manitoba before moving to Calgary, where she worked in sales and marketing for the Credit Union of Central Alberta. Gondek pursued a master's degree in sociology during a two-year stint at Greyhound.

She founded a strategic planning and communications consultancy, Tick Consulting, while pursuing a PhD in sociology at the University of Calgary, where she also taught and eventually directed a real-estate studies initiative at the university's Haskayne School of Business. Gondek was a member of the Calgary Planning Commission from 2012 to 2016. Gondek successfully defended her dissertation in 2014. Entitled Pressures of Hybridity: An analysis of Urban-Rural Nexus, it offered a case study of Rocky View County, a municipality that shares both rural and urban features surrounding most of Calgary, forming the city's northern boundary and most of the city's western and eastern boundaries.

== Political career ==
From 2017 to 2021 she was the councillor for Ward 3, which includes the communities of, Carrington, Country Hills, Country Hills Village, Coventry Hills, Harvest Hills, and Panorama Hills. Ward 3 is in the NW region of Calgary. Prior to her term as a city councillor, Gondek sat as a citizen member of the city's planning commission.

In 2021, it was reported that in 2013, Gondek's consultancy was hired by the Urban Development Institute, a special interest group for the development industry in Calgary, to influence public opinion in favour of urban sprawl. This, along with contributions from developers making up 47% of her donations in the 2017 municipal election—above the average of 35%—made her the subject of controversy.

=== Mayor of Calgary ===
On October 18, 2021, she was elected the 37th mayor of Calgary. Gondek was sworn in along with the incoming city council on October 25, 2021, becoming the first female mayor in the city's history.

During the swearing-in ceremony for the new City Council, Gondek refused to swear in Sean Chu, who was embroiled in a scandal following allegations of impropriety with a minor while he was a member of the Calgary Police Service. Gondek attended a rally calling for Chu's resignation.

On March 29, 2022, a poll by ThinkHQ Public Affairs pegged Gondek's approval rating at 38%, with 53% of respondents disapproving and the remaining 9% unsure. The unusually low approval rating in the first few months of her mayoral tenure has been attributed to the failed Calgary Event Centre deal, a four percent tax increase and the COVID-19 pandemic, including the related protests in the Beltline neighbourhood. Gondek responded to the poll, saying it was a "data point at a very specific point in time," and reflective of residents' frustrations with the uncertain economy caused by the pandemic.

In 2023, she announced a $1.22 billion deal with the Calgary Sports and Entertainment Corporation (CSEC) for the new Calgary Event Centre. The terms of the agreement are that the city will pay $537 million of the cost, the province will provide $330 million, and the CSEC will provide $356 million.

In December 2023, Gondek announced she would not attend the city's annual Hanukkah menorah lighting ceremony. She had initially accepted the invitation but withdrew when the event was positioned in part as a show of support for Israel, a move she said politicized the religious celebration given the ongoing Gaza war. Gondek's decision was met with varying reactions across Calgary. Some council members backed her stance against politicization, and others voiced concerns about Israel Bonds being sold at the event. Calgary MP Pat Kelly suggested that Gondek's withdrawal could normalize antisemitism, while Alberta Premier Danielle Smith called Gondek's decision a mistake and confirmed members of her government would participate in the event. The Calgary Jewish Foundation expressed disappointment at Gondek's decision and reaffirmed their support for Israel.

On January 30, 2024, Calgary business owner Landon Johnston filed a motion of recall against Gondek, due to his frustration with the city's spending and tax increases. The recall campaign required 514,284 in-person signatures between February and April 2024 to succeed, which political analysts deemed highly unlikely. Gondek responded by saying the motion came as a surprise, but that she was open to meeting with Johnston and other members of the public. On May 13, 2024, the city announced that the motion had failed, with only 69,344 unverified signatures signed.

Gondek ran for re-election in the 2025 municipal election. She was defeated in her bid for a second term, placing third behind Jeromy Farkas and city councillor Sonya Sharp. This marked the first time since Ross Alger in 1980 that a Calgary mayor was defeated after one term.
