= Jeromy Farkas =

Mayor of Calgary (born 1986)

His Worship Jeromy Farkas
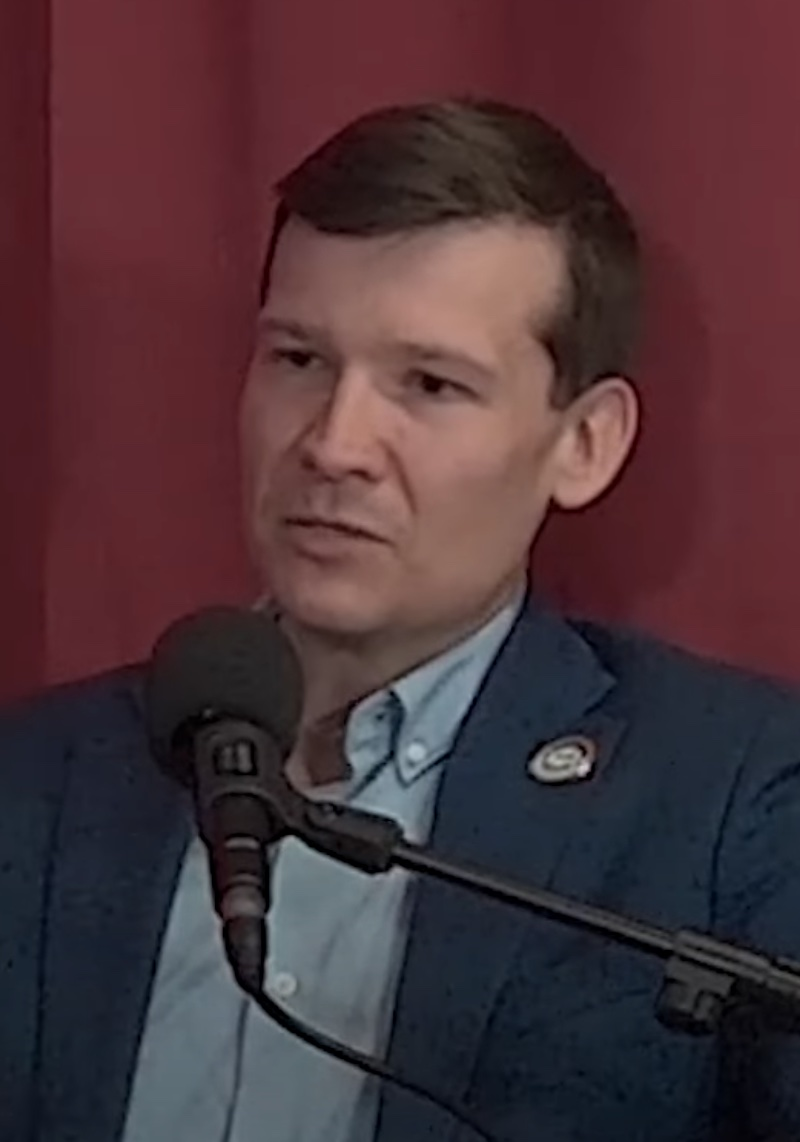
- Farkas in 2025

38th Mayor of Calgary
- Incumbent
- Assumed office October 29, 2025
- Preceded by: Jyoti Gondek

Calgary City Councillor for Ward 11
- In office October 23, 2017 – October 25, 2021
- Preceded by: Brian Pincott
- Succeeded by: Kourtney Penner

Personal details
- Born: 1985 or 1986 (age 39–40) Calgary, Alberta, Canada
- Party: Independent (municipal)
- Other political affiliations: Conservative (federal); Independent (provincial); Wildrose (provincial; until 2017)
- Education: University of Calgary
- Website: Official website

Jeromy Farkas (born 1986) is a Canadian non-profit executive and politician who has served as the mayor of Calgary since 2025. He had a four-year term as City Councillor on Calgary City Council from 2017–2021.

Described as socially liberal and fiscally conservative, he ran as a candidate for mayor in the 2021 municipal election, placing second to Jyoti Gondek.

In 2022, he completed a 168-day journey of the Pacific Crest Trail from Mexico to Canada in support of Big Brothers and Big Sisters of Calgary and Area. After returning home in 2023, he was CEO of the Glenbow Ranch Park Foundation.

Farkas again ran for mayor in the 2025 municipal election, that time successfully placing first ahead of City Councillor Sonya Sharp and incumbent Mayor Jyoti Gondek.

== Early life and education ==
Farkas was born in 1986 and raised by Hungarian immigrants in the southeast Calgary neighbourhood of Dover. His parents had fled Hungary in 1956, in the wake of the Hungarian Uprising of 1956.

After graduating from Calgary's Bishop Carroll High School, Farkas attended the University of Calgary and graduated with a bachelor of arts in political science. Farkas worked as the Executive Administrator for the Israel Studies Program and as a Research Team Lead in the Faculty of Medicine during university.

In 2015, Farkas' team earned first place in the City of Calgary Hackathon, a three-day contest in programming, business modeling and research to create technology-based solutions to improve the lives of Calgarians. Prior to entering politics, he was a regular Calgary Herald columnist writing about local municipal issues, particularly city council.

Prior to declaring his candidacy for Ward 11, Farkas worked as a senior fellow specializing in municipal governance at the conservative Manning Foundation for Democratic Education from February 2013 to January 2016.

== Political career ==
=== City Councillor (2017–2021) ===
Farkas declined the pension that the mayor and councillors receive. He also declined the transition allowance afforded to him, at an approximate personal cost of $290,000.

As a City Councillor, Farkas held regular constituency events on current issues such as snow clearing, exploring a 2026 Calgary Olympic Bid and the proposed 2019 arena deal. He engaged in Council debate on issues such as Midfield trailer park's closure, council compensation, the Calgary Green Line, the City of Calgary summer student hiring program, business taxes, council time spent in closed-door meetings, crime and safety, the failed 2026 Calgary Olympic Bid, and the arena deal.

During the COVID-19 pandemic, a municipal by-law was proposed for proof of COVID vaccinations for certain types of business. Farkas was the only member of council to vote against this by-law, citing concerns about legal jurisdiction and stating "we need to work with the province to fix the current system, rather than increase confusion for citizens and businesses who are already struggling to comply."

==== 2021 mayoral campaign ====
On September 16, 2020, Farkas announced his candidacy for mayor in the 2021 Calgary municipal election.

Farkas' ten-point platform included a four-year property tax freeze, support for the Calgary Police Service, reform to the Council pension plan, support for single-family neighbourhood zoning, improvements to traffic-light synchronization, reduction of Council time spent behind closed doors, the construction of a rail connection between the inner-city and Calgary International Airport, improved snow removal, opposition to selling city parks, and reduction of business red tape.

On October 18, 2021, Farkas placed second to Ward 3 councillor Jyoti Gondek.

=== Glenbow Ranch (2023–2025) ===
In October 2023, Farkas was named as CEO of the Glenbow Ranch Park Foundation. Referring to Glenbow Ranch Provincial Park, Farkas stated "after losing the 2021 election, I felt lost in more ways than one. I found purpose, meaning, and belonging in the vastness of Alberta's rolling hills, grasslands, and mountains."

The provincial government soon conducted a feasibility study into options for a reservoir along the Bow River, to help protect Calgary and communities downstream from flooding and to help surround areas in case of drought. One of those options would have resulted in significant negative impacts and flood damage to Glenbow Ranch Provincial Park and the Town of Cochrane. Over the course of 2024, Farkas mounted a successful advocacy campaign to save the park, and is credited by media as "playing a major role" and "leading the charge" in negotiating an alternative outcome with the provincial government.

In May 2025, Farkas resigned the position to begin a full-time campaign for mayor of Calgary. At the time, Cochrane Mayor Jeff Genung and Glenbow Ranch Park Foundation board chair Georg Paffrath praised Farkas' leadership, the latter stating "one of the first things he did was really look at the team underneath him and gave them the type of leadership they were looking for, and made them better employees."

=== Mayor (2025–present) ===
On February 26, 2025, Farkas announced his candidacy for mayor in the 2025 Calgary municipal election, as an independent. Farkas narrowly defeated Communities First candidate Sonya Sharp and incumbent Jyoti Gondek, with under 1,000 votes separating Farkas and Sharp.

During his first year in office, Farkas made the accelerated replacement of Calgary's Bearspaw South Feeder Main a priority following the city's 2024 water main failure. Under his tenure, The City of Calgary advanced construction on a replacement feeder main and associated reliability upgrades, with completion targeted for late 2026.

In 2026, Farkas supported the repeal of pro-housing legislation which made it easier to build housing in Calgary. Farkas said, "Many Calgarians felt, with the previous decision to adopt blanket rezoning, that it had created uncertainty and it really broke the trust in the planning process."

During the 2026 Alberta separatism debate, Farkas emerged as one of the province's most prominent municipal opponents of secession. He argued that uncertainty surrounding separation would discourage investment, reduce business confidence, and harm Calgary's economy, while describing Calgary as an integral part of Canada.

==== Mayoral approval ratings ====
Public opinion polling during Farkas's first year in office indicated high approval ratings among Calgary residents. A Probe Research poll published by CityNews Calgary in May 2026 found that 80 per cent of respondents approved of Farkas's performance as mayor, six months into his first term, while nearly 60 per cent said Calgary was moving in the right direction.

== Personal life ==
He is openly bisexual, making him Calgary's first openly LGBTQ male mayor and city councillor, and played a key role in pushing the Wildrose Party to adopt a more progressive position on LGBTQ issues. Following his 2021 mayoral loss, he completed a 168 day, 4,260-kilometre journey of the Pacific Crest Trail in support of Big Brothers and Big Sisters of Calgary and Area, raising more than $250,000 as part of that organization's biggest fundraiser in its history.

== Electoral record ==
2025 Calgary mayoral election

Party	Candidate	Votes	%
Independent	Jeromy Farkas	91,065	26.12
Communities First	Sonya Sharp	90,480	25.95
Independent	Jyoti Gondek	71,397	20.48
Independent	Jeff Davison	47,372	13.59
The Calgary Party	Brian Thiessen	40,519	11.62
Independent	Sarah Elder	3,511	1.01
Independent	Grant Prior	2,175	0.62
Independent	Larry R. Heather	1,202	0.34
Independent	Jaeger Gustafson	905	0.26

2021 Calgary mayoral election

Candidate	Vote	%
Jyoti Gondek	176,344	45.17
Jeromy Farkas	116,698	29.89
Jeff Davison	50,654	12.98
Brad Field	19,329	4.95
Jan Damery	8,935	2.29
Grace Yan	2,746	0.70
Zane Novak	1,991	0.51
Dean Hopkins	1,832	0.47
Kevin J. Johnston	1,565	0.40
Zaheed Ali Khan	1,247	0.32
Virginia Stone	1,172	0.30
Shaoli Wang	1,061	0.27
Ian Chiang	973	0.25
Teddy Ogbonna	862	0.22
Emile Gabriel	682	0.17
Zac Hartley	582	0.15
Sunny Singh	572	0.15
James Desautels	531	0.14
Mizanur Rahman	450	0.12
Larry Heather	429	0.11
Stan Waciak	423	0.11
Paul Michael Hallelujah	376	0.10
Adam Roberts	308	0.08
Will Vizor	204	0.05
Geoff Rainey	162	0.04
Randall Kaiser	137	0.04
Cory Lanterman	118	0.03
David Clark (Withdrawn)		
Kent Hehr (Withdrawn)		
Grant Prior (Withdrawn)		

2017 Calgary municipal election — Ward 11
Candidate	Votes	%
Jeromy Farkas	13,170	38.38
Linda Johnson	7,588	22.12
Janet Eremenko	6,890	20.08
Robert Dickinson	4,446	12.96
Keith Simmons	2,214	6.45
Total	34,308	100
