= Richard Pootmans =

Canadian Politician

City of Calgary Councillor
- In office October 18, 2010 – October 16, 2017
- Preceded by: Joe Connelly
- Succeeded by: Jeff Davison
- Constituency: Ward 6

City of Calgary Councillor
- In office October 25, 2021 – November 26, 2024
- Preceded by: Jeff Davison
- Succeeded by: John Pantazopoulos
- Constituency: Ward 6

Personal details
- Spouse: Frances Wright
- Education: University of Calgary; Mount Royal University; Carleton University
- Website: http://www.calgary.ca/councillors/ward-6/Pages/Ward-6.aspx

Richard Pootmans is a Canadian politician who served as the councillor for Ward 6 on the Calgary City Council. Pootmans initially served two terms from 2010 to 2017 before a one-term hiatus during which he co-founded a consultancy. He returned to council following the 2021 municipal election. Pootmans resigned from his position on November 26, 2024, citing "personal and family reasons," less than a year from the 2025 Calgary municipal election.

== Early life ==
Richard Pootmans was born in 1956.

== Education ==
Lisgar Collegiate (Ottawa) Class of 1974

Carleton University (Ottawa) Class of 1979

Mount Royal University (Petroleum Land Management) Class of 1979

University of Calgary (MBA) 1996

== Awards ==
Pootmans was the 2009 recipient of the Economic Development Alberta Economic Developer of the Year.

== Career before politics ==
Pootmans was a founding member of the 17th Ave Business Improvement Area (BIA), which became the first BIA established in Calgary on September 18, 1984. Pootmans was a business owner on the business corridor at the time, and advocated for investment in the "deteriorating streetscape" as competition with Chinook Centre and the then-unfinished Eau Claire Market loomed.

Prior to being elected in 2010, Pootmans taught as an instructor for 5 years at the Haskayne School of Business at the University of Calgary. He was Senior Business Development Manager, Real Estate – Calgary Economic Development, Financial Analyst; Vice President, Installations – SMED International, Consultant; Financial management, business strategy – TractionWorks, Co-owner – PORTS International stores, Calgary, and worked as a Landman – Hudson's Bay Oil and Gas Company, Dome Petroleum.

== Electoral record ==
=== 2010 municipal election ===
Pootmans was first elected to serve Ward 6 in the 2010 election, taking 31% of the votes in a field of 10 candidates.

=== 2013 municipal election ===
Pootmans was reelected in the 2013 election by capturing 51% of the votes.

=== 2021 municipal election ===
After a four-year hiatus from politics, Pootmans sought election in Ward 6 during the 2021 municipal election. His successor, Jeff Davison, did not run for council, instead seeking the mayoralty. Pootmans won with 48% of the vote on October 18.
