= Ward Sutherland =

City of Calgary Councillor
- In office October 21, 2013 – October 25, 2021
- Preceded by: Dale Hodges
- Succeeded by: Sonya Sharp
- Constituency: Ward 1
- Website: http://www.calgary.ca/Councillors/Ward-1/Pages/Ward-1.aspx

Ward Sutherland is a municipal politician who previously served as Councillor of Ward 1 in Calgary, Alberta. He was elected in the 2013 municipal election.

== Awards ==
In January 2013, Sutherland was awarded the Queen Elizabeth II Diamond Jubilee Medal for significant contribution to the community.

== Career before politics ==
Sutherland held senior leadership and management positions at companies such as Sony, Tim Hortons, McDonald's, and Hartco.

Prior to being elected, Sutherland served as president of the Rocky Ridge Royal Oak Community Association.

== 2013 municipal election ==
Sutherland was elected to represent Ward 1 by capturing 39% of the votes, narrowly defeating Chris Harper, who also took 39%, but with 86 fewer votes. Upon his election, Sutherland was the first Métis councillor in Calgary in 20 years.

== 2017 Controversy ==
In October 2017, days before a municipal election Ward Sutherland was accused of racist comments. He was cited as referring to "Johnny Jew" from New York. He denied it and insisted he was referring to Jimmy Choo.
