= Sean Chu =

Canadian politician

City of Calgary Councillor
- In office October 21, 2013 – October 29, 2025
- Preceded by: Gael MacLeod
- Succeeded by: DJ Kelly
- Constituency: Ward 4

Personal details
- Born: Wen-Hsiang Chu; 1962 or 1963 (age 62–63) Taiwan
- Party: Progressive Conservative Association of Alberta (2008)
- Education: Mount Royal College
- Website: Official website Twitter

Sean Wen-Hsiang Chu (born 1962 or 1963) is a municipal politician who served as councillor of Ward 4 in Calgary, Alberta, Canada. He was elected in the 2013 municipal election. He did not seek re-election in the 2025 municipal election.

== Electoral record ==
Chu first entered Canadian politics in 2008 with an unsuccessful run to represent Calgary Buffalo at the provincial level. Running as a member of the PC party, Chu finished second.

His next attempt at office was an unsuccessful run to represent Ward 4 in 2010. During that election, he came in second to Gael MacLeod with 21% of the vote, to her 25%.

=== 2013 municipal election ===
Chu was elected to represent Ward 4 by capturing 43% of the votes, defeating incumbent Gael MacLeod, who took 40%.

=== 2017 municipal election ===
Chu was re-elected to represent Ward 4 in 2017 by capturing 48% of the votes (16,327) while the closest rival was Greg Miller with 41% (13,965) followed by Blair Berdusco and Srini Ganti. Total votes cast 33,721.

=== 2021 municipal election ===
Chu was re-elected to represent Ward 4 in 2021 by capturing 43% of the votes (12,422) defeating rival DJ Kelly with 42% (12,370) by a small margin.

== Controversies ==
=== Facebook comments with racist undertones ===
In November 2021, comments Chu made on Facebook in 2011 resurfaced. His comment is listed below:

"Here’s my cheapest solution to air travel security: every airplane carries a cute live pet pig on board. Almost all terrorists will not die together with pigs."

=== Allegation of sexual assault ===
In October 2021, news broke that Chu had been found guilty of professional misconduct in relation to sexual contact with a minor while he was a police officer with the Calgary Police Service by his own admission. Chu says he was unaware of the victim's age. The incident took place in 1997, when Chu was 34, and the victim was 16. Chu was investigated for two allegations: one for bringing the victim into his home in the "early morning hours" and the other for sexual misconduct in his actions with the victim. Following a hearing, Chu was convicted on one count of misconduct. The victim pursued the matter for nine years, before a publication ban was lifted.

Investigative reporting by CTV News uncovered that Chu had been asked to drop the girl off at her house at the request of another officer, but instead took her to his house. Chu's claim that he had met the minor at an establishment that was an "18-plus licensed establishment" was called into question, as the location was a public restaurant. Allegedly, the victim was then sexually assaulted in Chu's home, with Chu allegedly pulling out his Calgary Police Service handgun to coerce the victim. Reports following the incident's internal investigation stated that: “disturbing in the evidence presented by Constable Chu was his readiness to use police business cards, police pagers and his police appeal to enhance his off-duty personal life.”

Calls for Chu's resignation rose following these allegations, with #ResignSeanChu trending on Twitter. Bipartisan calls from both the UCP's Leela Aheer and the NDP's Janis Irwin called for his immediate resignation as a Calgary city councillor, following his reelection with a majority of 52 votes. Their calls were later joined by Premier of Alberta Jason Kenney, Minister of Municipal Affairs Ric McIver, and MP Michelle Rempel Garner. Fellow Calgary city council member Kourtney Branagan stated in a social media post that she herself was a victim of sexual assault and that "[we] cannot send a signal to the women of this city that those in leadership positions who are guilty of offences against women and minors are allowed to hold power." Chu has faced calls to resign from all members of Calgary's city council including mayor Jyoti Gondek.

Gondek stated she would refuse to swear Chu in as a city councillor, requesting that the provincial government intervene due to Chu's refusal to step down. Gondek particularly emphasized the recall provisions within the Municipal Government Act and the Local Authorities Election Act, or Bill 52.

On October 24, 2021, two protests in support and opposing Chu's resignation occurred at Olympic Plaza. Incoming mayor Gondek attended the rally to push Chu to resign.

=== Social media ===
Chu is a frequent user of Twitter and has made several statements on the platform for which he has later apologized.

- Chu apologized after sending out, and later deleting, two tweets that berated a city employee over a presentation around a planned downtown bike lane.
- Chu tweeted that recent cold weather and the fact a ship is stuck in ice near Antarctica seem to have quieted climate change "alarmists".
- He compared the Irish vote to allow same-sex marriage to "our own social revolution to screw the dt [downtown] businesses. Cycletracks."

=== Green Line controversies ===
Chu has made numerous claims over the Green Line and its lack of progress in coming to North Calgary.

- In 2014, Chu accused city administration of not informing him that the train alignment was focused on Centre Street. Other councillors stated they had been informed weeks earlier.
- In 2017, when it was announced that the train would not go to Ward 4 in Stage One, Chu stated that "I found out about this reduction in scope from media reports".
- In his 2017 campaign video, Chu claimed he fought for funding to extend the Green Line to our northernmost communities. The Stage One implementation ends at 16th Avenue North.

=== City controversies ===
- In 2016, over a year before the October 2017 election, Chu used City of Calgary literature to campaign in communities that were not in Ward 4.
- Chu criticized city administration for a report on cycletracks, saying he had been told by a University of Calgary professor that the city was “biased” in its evaluation. Chu was unable to name the professor and was rebuked by the city's transportation manager.

=== Amanda Wilkie defamation lawsuit ===
In April 2015 Chu's former campaign manager, Amanda Wilkie, launched a lawsuit for $275,000 alleging that Chu made defamatory comments about her when he spoke to a mutual acquaintance in November 2013 and on other occasions.

== Personal life ==
In 2008, Chu was involved in a domestic dispute with his wife, where police were called and a firearm of his was removed from the house.
