= Jim Stevenson (politician) =

Municipal politician from Alberta, Canada

City of Calgary Councillor
- In office October 15, 2007 – October 16, 2017
- Preceded by: Helene Larocque
- Succeeded by: Jyoti Gondek
- Constituency: Ward 3

Personal details
- Born: Montreal, Quebec
- Spouse: Diane
- Website: Official Website; Official Twitter

Jim Stevenson is a municipal politician who served as Councillor of Ward 3 in Calgary, Alberta. He was first elected in the 2007 municipal election.

== Career before politics ==
Prior to being elected in 2007, Jim served as the president of the N.E. Calgary District for the Conservative Party of Canada from 2000 to 2007. He currently serves as vice-president of the Alberta Urban Municipalities Association.

== Electoral record ==
=== 2007 municipal election ===
Stevenson was first elected by a very slim margin of 33 votes (5,452 vs 5,419) over George Chahal.

=== 2010 municipal election ===
Stevenson easily won the 2010 election, taking 62% of the votes (10,913) over runner-up Helene Larocque's 22% (3,905).

=== 2013 municipal election ===
Stevenson was again elected to represent Ward 3, this time with 81% of the votes.
