= Joe Magliocca =

Municipal politician in Calgary, Alberta, Canada

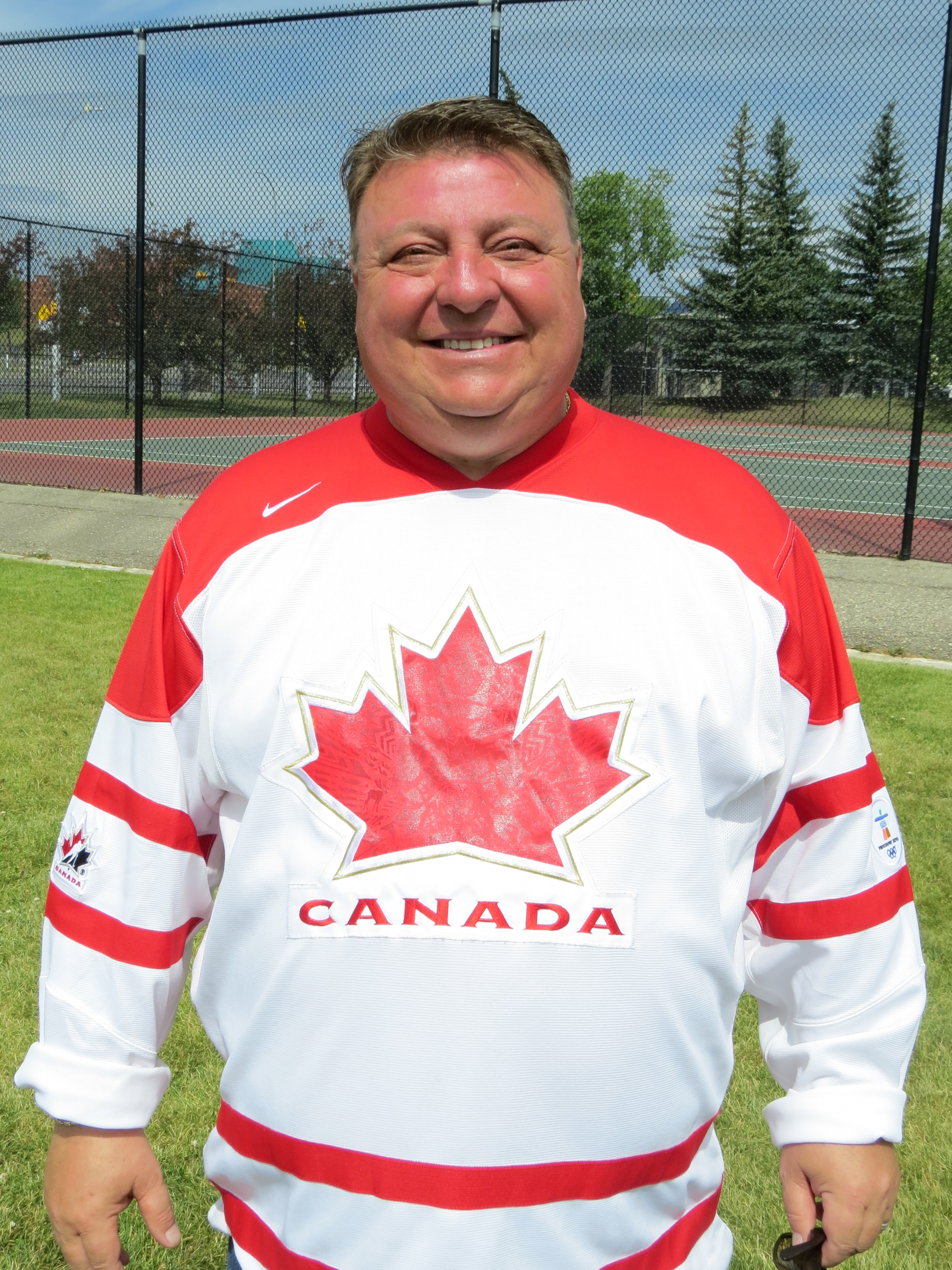
- Joe Magliocca on Canada Day (July 1st) 2017.

City of Calgary Councillor
- In office October 21, 2013 – October 25, 2021
- Preceded by: Gord Lowe
- Succeeded by: Jennifer Wyness
- Constituency: Ward 2

Personal details
- Spouse: Carol Magliocca
- Education: Seneca College
- Occupation: City Councillor
- Website: Official Website; Twitter; Facebook

Joe (Biagio) Magliocca is a municipal politician who served as Councillor of Ward 2 in Calgary, Alberta. He was elected in the 2013 municipal election. He lost his seat in the 2021 Calgary municipal election to Jennifer Wyness after receiving approximately 10% of votes.

In February 2020, Postmedia reported Magliocca had spent two to three times the amount of money as other Calgary city councillors during a 2019 business trip to Quebec City. The trip was to attend the Federation of Canadian Municipality conference and the 10 participants (9 councillors and Mayor Nenshi) spent a collective $30,000 with most spending around $3,200. Councillor Magliocca spent $6,400 during the trip, including $1,800 in drinks and meals over the 5-day trip.

In response to the story breaking, the city of Calgary hired PricewaterhouseCoopers LLP to conduct a forensic audit of Magliocca's expenses. The report was made public in July 2019. Detailed in the report are inappropriate expense claims totalling over $5,600 including flight upgrades and hosted events with attendance lists that were disputed by the listed attendees as false.

The city council voted to turn the report over to the Calgary police in July 2019 and on October 8, 2021, Magliocca was charged with one count of fraud under $5,000 and one count of breach of trust. His trial began on September 9, 2024.

== Career before politics ==
Prior to being elected Magliocca worked as a Charter sales executive for the western region for Sky Service Business Aviation Inc.

Before being elected to City Council, Magliocca served for seven years on the Hamptons Community Association board, also serving as president of the board during that time.

His work includes time as the owner of Calgary City Mix. Magliocca is also the owner of Lexor Group where his company was responsible for airport runways, markings, signage and surfacing maintenance amongst hundreds of airports across Canada and the USA.

== 2013 municipal election ==
Magliocca was elected to represent Ward 2 by capturing 33% of the votes. Magliocca had come in second in the 2010 and 2007 municipal elections in the same ward.
