= Evan Woolley =

Canadian politician

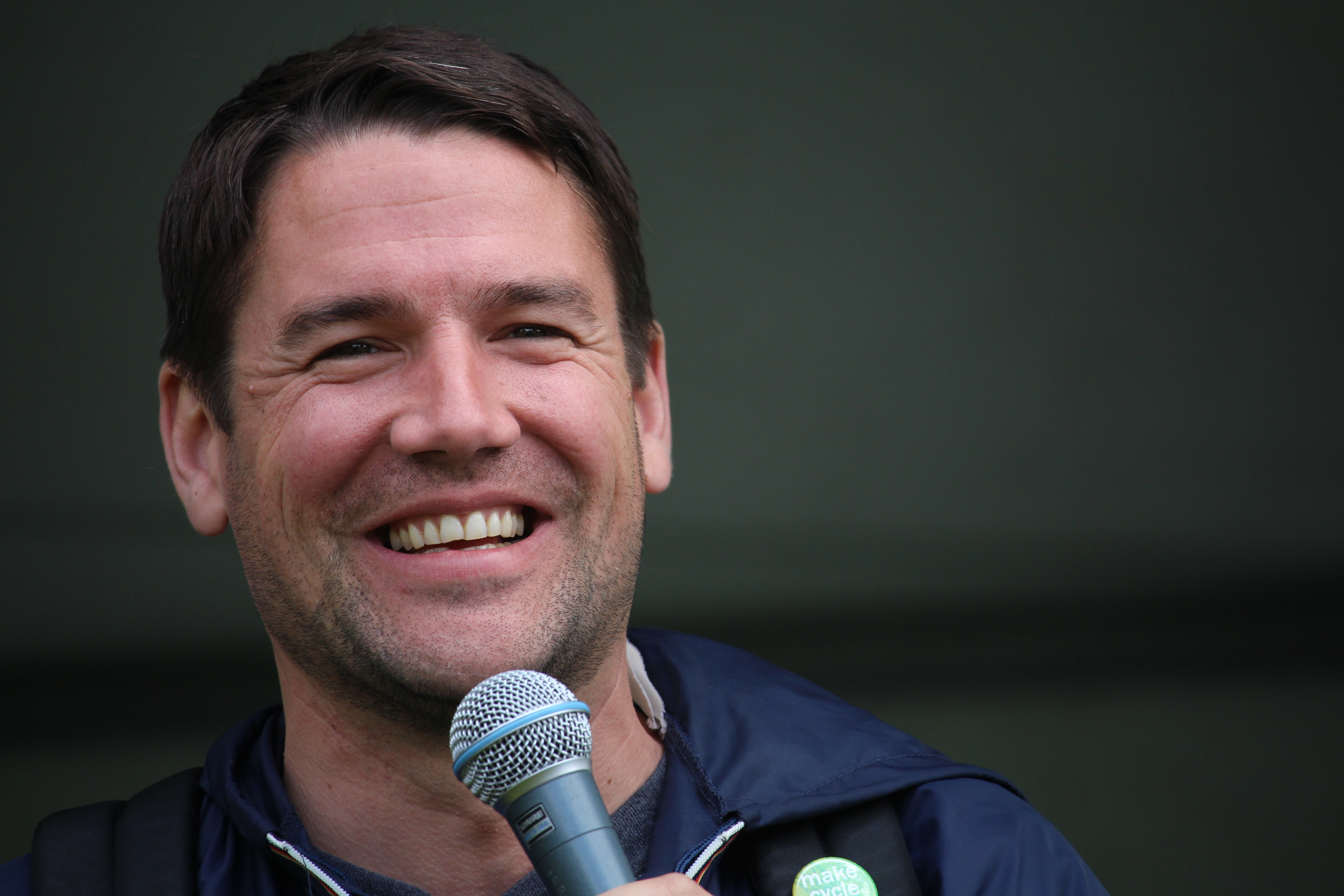

City of Calgary Councillor
- In office October 21, 2013 – October 25, 2021
- Preceded by: John Mar
- Succeeded by: Courtney Walcott
- Constituency: Ward 8

Personal details
- Born: Calgary
- Spouse: Andrea Wettstein
- Education: Carleton University
- Website: http://www.evan-woolley.ca/

Evan Woolley is a municipal politician who served as councillor of Ward 8 in Calgary, Alberta. He was first elected in 2013, becoming the city's youngest councillor.

== Career before politics ==
Prior to being elected in 2007, Woolley served as Community Relations Advisor in the Office of Sustainability and as the Program Coordinator for Public Art for the City of Calgary, and as Communications and Media Relations Advisor for Enerplus.

Woolley also spent four years on the board of the Cliff-Bungalow-Mission Community Association.

== Electoral record ==
=== 2013 municipal election ===
Woolley won his seat for Ward 8 in the 2013 election by capturing 51% of the votes, defeating two-term incumbent John Mar, who took 43%.

=== 2017 municipal election ===
Woolley was re-elected in October 2017. At 58% of votes received, he was one of only three Councillors to receive a majority.

=== 2021 municipal election ===
On January 22, 2021, Woolley announced that he would not run in the 2021 election.
