= Diane Colley-Urquhart =

Canadian politician

Diane Marie Colley-Urquhart
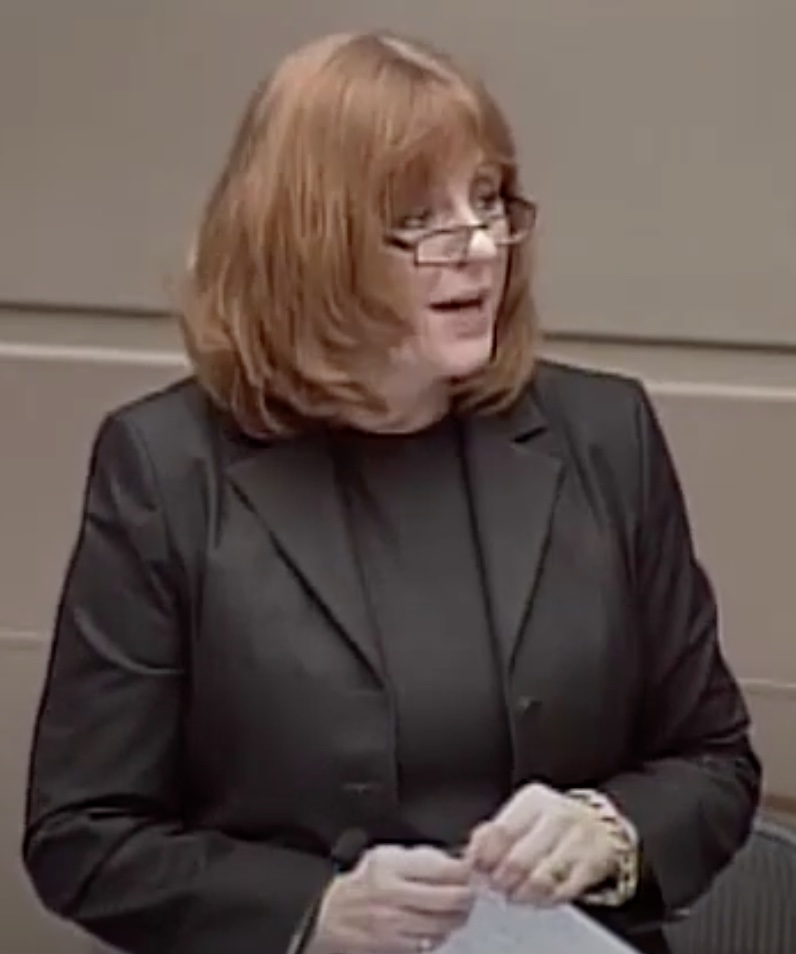
- Colley-Urquhart in 2011

City of Calgary Councillor
- In office July 10, 2000 – October 25, 2021
- Preceded by: Patti Grier
- Succeeded by: Dan McLean
- Constituency: Ward 13

Personal details
- Spouse: David Urquhart (Deceased)
- Website: Official Twitter

Diane Marie Colley-Urquhart is a former municipal politician from Calgary, Alberta, Canada. She was a member of Calgary City Council and served as the representative for Ward 13.

== Early life and nursing career ==
Diane Colley-Urquhart grew up on a farm in Oyen, Alberta prior to moving to Calgary.

After receiving her BSc in Health and Human Services, Diane has had a nearly 50 year registered nursing career. Colley-Urquhart has held senior management and teaching positions in Emergency, Intensive Trauma and Cardiac Care with Foothills Medical Centre, the University of Alberta Hospital, Beverly Care Centre, the Heart and Stroke Foundation of Canada, the Canadian Cancer Society, Kids Help Phone and Westhampton Management Ltd. She has worked occasionally as a Care Coordinator at the Calgary Chronic Pain Centre and with Alberta Health Services.

In April 2013, while running on a beach in San Diego, California, Colley-Urquhart rescued an injured surfer. The man had been hit by his own board and was stunned. Colley-Urquhart pulled him out of the water and tended to several gashes on his face until help arrived.

== Political career ==
=== Alderman and Councillor ===
Colley-Urquhart was first elected as an Alderman on July 4, 2000. She won a contested by-election in Ward 13 over ten other candidates. She was sworn into her post on July 10, 2000, and has since been re-elected in 2001, 2004, 2007, 2010, 2013, and 2017. In 2010, Calgary City Council voted to change the title Alderman to the more gender-neutral term Councillor, resulting in a change of title for Colley-Urquhart after the following election in 2013.

Colley-Urquhart sat on the Calgary Police Commission between 2002 and 2017. Colley-Urquhart created the STOP Marijuana Grow-ops Coalition in 2005 in recognition of the growing number of marijuana grow operations within the City.

Colley-Urquhart campaigned against tax increases in the 2008 budget debates. She held a "Tax Payers Revolt" at Calgary City Hall. Colley-Urquhart opposed the Peace pedestrian bridge.

Colley-Urquhart was re-elected in the 2010 Municipal elections Alderman for Ward 13.

Colley-Urquhart resigned from the Calgary Police Commission in February 2017, following allegations that she may have violated the Commission's Code of Conduct. The accusations stemmed from statements Colley-Urquhart made regarding the treatment of female officers serving with the Calgary Police Service, after she said she had dozens of private meetings with female officers who alleged they were bullied and harassed. She was replaced on the Commission by Councillor Richard Pootmans.

In 2020 Colley-Urquhart was the sole city councillor to vote against renaming Calgary Chinatown's James Short Park, which was named after a leader of the anti-Chinese movement. Colley-Urquhart explained her vote by saying that she didn't want the city to "fall into cancel culture."

=== 2017 Antarctic vacation ===
Colley-Urquhart was absent for council meetings in November 2017 as she was on vacation in the Antarctic. She alerted council to her absence in a letter that was referenced by the media.

"After flying into Buenos Aires and exploring the city, I will embark on an educational expedition voyage on a ship deep into the Antarctic to spend time with the penguins and icebergs… When I am in Port Stanley in the Falkland Islands, I will tip one for each of you and think of you… I will gain insight into global warming — perhaps!"

During her trip she was absent for a motion in council to consider reviewing the South West Bus Rapid Transit project. She was the Notice of Motion's co-author. Had her trip not ended early due to mechanical problems, Colley-Urquhart would have missed council's budget review, which is held every year in November.

=== Golf Course(s) ===
==== 2012 Shawnee Slopes ====
In 2010, Colley-Urquhart was the running councillor of Ward 13 at the time of the Shawnee Slopes redevelopment proposal. Geo-Enterprise, which had purchased the Shawnee Slopes golf course, proposed a redevelopment plan which would turn all 18 holes into a mix of approximately 1600 residential properties with community amenities. The plan includes low-density detached homes, condominiums and a community centre, all "surrounded by trees, greenery and open spaces," cited Geo-Enterprise. The Community Association president, Gloria Dingwall, and community members explained the redevelopment of the community would drastically impact their properties and negatively impact the quality of life of the residents.

"The issue is we bought into this neighbourhood because of the golf course. If you take that away and put 1,600 condo units then the neighbourhood you bought into is gone."

During the Ward 13 election campaign, competing candidates identified the golf course redevelopment as precedent setting city-wide issue and called for caution by City Council.In response, Colley-Urquhart vowed to the community to make the issue a civic election issue. Colley-Urquhart would win the race for the councillor of Ward 13 and be responsible for addressing the growing community concern over the controversial redevelopment.

In February 2012, City council rejected the community proposal on a vote of 10 to 4. Community residents voiced their disappointment with Council’s decision.

"We feel cheated," said retiree Joe Tanyi, who bought in the area without realizing that one day the golf course could be sold and redeveloped. Colley-Urquhart would state "This council, as we have it today, is clearly geared toward less footprint and increasing density in existing communities, irrespective of whether the transportation network is failing."

In 2020, the Shawnee Slopes redevelopment underwent additional changes as a rezoning application proposed a 24-hour gas bar to replace the original commercial use designated for retail and a shopping centre.

==== Richmond Green Golf Course ====
In 2019, Colley-Urquhart raised a motion to Council to close the nine-hole golf course, located on the southwest quadrant of the city. The golf course closed after the end of the 2019 season.

Colley-Urquhart asked City staff to provide an interim update to council in October 2020 on an ongoing review of all six city-owned golf courses and their potential for sale or redevelopment.

Mayor Naheed Nenshi, who opposed the motion, questioning whether it was too early to make the decision about closing a course while administration worked on a broader review, which is scheduled to come back to council next year.

Colley-Urquhart said she has long been a proponent of public golf courses, but "the time will come when our personal opinion about public golf in the city is unsustainable."

=== Calgary-Glenmore by-election ===
Colley-Urquhart was the candidate of the province of Alberta's ruling Progressive Conservative party in a by-election called in the riding of Calgary-Glenmore for September 14, 2009, to become that riding's Member of the Alberta Legislative Assembly.

Colley-Urquhart finished in third place, behind the victorious Wildrose Alliance candidate, Paul Hinman, and the runner-up, Liberal Party candidate Avalon Roberts. It was the first time since 1967 that the Progressive Conservative candidate failed to win the riding.

=== Volunteer positions ===
She has canvassed and volunteered for numerous organizations such as the World Police and Fire Games, Calgary Police Interpretive Centre, the Alzheimer’s Society & Calgary Handibus. She also volunteered on the Ronald Reagan Presidential Committee in Wichita, Kansas, served as President of the Alberta P.C. Women’s Association, Vice-President of the National P.C. Women’s Federation, Alberta Vice-President of the P.C. Party of Canada, Co- Chaired the Kim Campbell Leadership Committee for Southern Alberta, and served as President of the Calgary Glenmore P.C. Association. Colley-Urquhart was President of Prime Minister Stephen Harper’s SW riding association.

=== Committees and boards ===
Colley-Urquhart has served as:

• Chair, Standing Policy Committee (SPC) on Land Use, Planning and Transportation • Chair, Audit Sub-Committee on Snow and Ice Removal • Member, Finance & Audit Committee • Member, Complaint Oversight Committee • Co-Chair, Calgary Police Interpretive Center Capital Campaign • Director, ALERT (Alberta Law Enforcement Response Teams) Board of Directors • Member, Audit Committee • Member, Standing Policy Committee (SPC) on Community & Protective Services • Member, Intergovernmental Affairs Committee • Alberta Vice Chair, Canadian Forces Liaison Council • Honorary Chair, Safer Calgary Board • Honorary Spokesman, MADD • Director, Calgary Glenmore P.C. Association Board of Directors • Former President, Calgary South Federal Conservative Party Board of Directors • Former Member, Prime Minister’s Fundraising Committee • Former Member, Calgary Police Commission.

=== October 2021 Election Defeat ===
On October 18, 2021, Colley-Urquhart was defeated in her bid for re-election, finishing a distant third out of three candidates.
