= Gian-Carlo Carra =

Canadian municipal politician

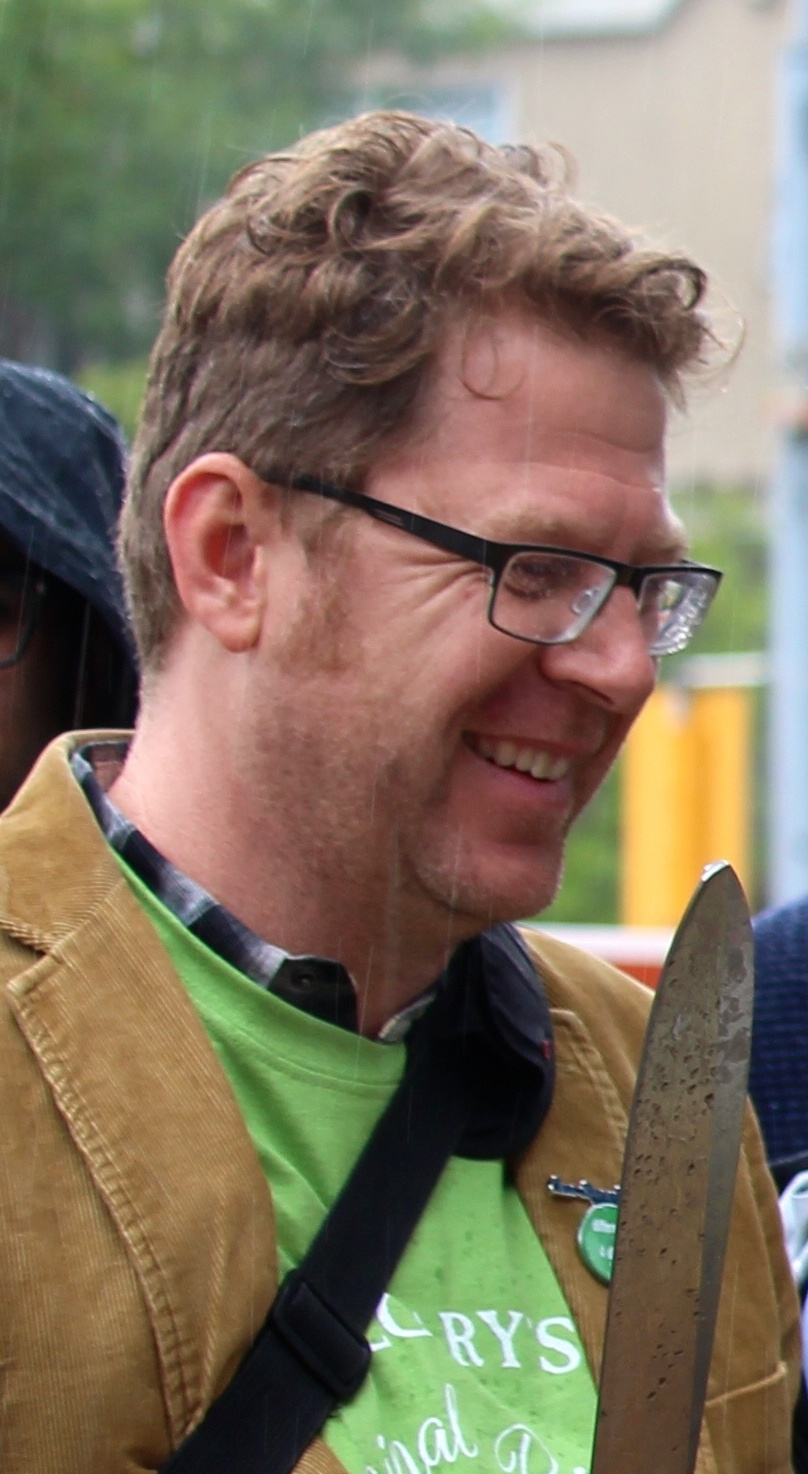

City of Calgary Councillor
- In office October 18, 2010 – October 29, 2025
- Succeeded by: Harrison Clark
- Constituency: Ward 9

Personal details
- Born: Calgary
- Spouse: Barb Carra
- Education: BA University of Calgary; MA Environmental Design/Urban Design
- Alma mater: University of Calgary
- Occupation: urban design
- Website: City of Calgary Website Facebook; Official Twitter

Gian-Carlo Carra is a municipal politician who served as Councillor of Ward 9 in Calgary, Alberta. He was first elected in 2010 and subsequently re-elected in 2013 and 2017.

== Campaign platform ==
His campaign platform, "Great Neighbourhoods" under which he ran in the three elections is a "synthesis of leading practices from across North America, grounded in the ideal that "Great Neighbourhoods make a Great City."

== Education ==
Carra completed both his BA and his MA (Environmental Design/Urban Design) at the University of Calgary.

== Professional life ==
Before being elected to Council Cara worked from 2000 to 2010 in sustainable urban design.

== Tenure as city councillor ==
The area he served—Ward 9—includes the communities of Acadia, Bridgeland/Riverside (part), Dover, Erlton, Fairview, Inglewood, Manchester, Ogden, Parkhill, Ramsay, Renfrew, Rideau Park, Riverbend, Roxboro, Tuxedo Park, and Winston Heights/Mountview.

He served under Mayor Naheed Nenshi who was also first elected to office in October 2010.

== Electoral record ==
=== 2010 municipal election ===
Carra was elected to serve Ward 9 in the 2010 election, taking 31% of the votes with runner-up Steve Chapman taking 12% of the votes.

=== 2013 municipal election ===
Carra was reelected in the 2013 election by capturing 48% of the votes with Jordan Katz taking 26%.

=== 2017 municipal election ===
Carra was one of five Calgary politicians targeted by an anonymous newly formed political action committee (PAC) called Save Calgary who gave Carra a "failing grade".

=== 2021 municipal election ===
Carra was reelected to a 4th term at the 2021 election, capturing 36% of the vote, slightly ahead of challenger Naomi Withers with 35%.

== Volunteer work ==
Carra began working with the Inglewood Community Association in Inglewood in 2000 and by 2003 became the President of the Association where he served until 2010.

== Personal life ==
Carra is married to Barb and they have a son, Vance Urbano, who was born in 2012.
