= 1998 Calgary municipal election =

Election in Alberta, Canada

← 1995	October 19, 1998	2001 →

Mayor and 14 aldermen to Calgary City Council
	A. D.	R. C.
Leader	Al Duerr	Ray Clark
Popular vote	182,780	43,242
	R. B.	R. W.
Leader	Rick Bell	Ron Wise
Popular vote	20,812	1,097
Mayor before election
Al Duerr
Elected mayor
Al Duerr

The 1998 Calgary municipal election was held on October 19, 1998, to elect a Mayor and 14 Aldermen to Calgary City Council.

In addition to the city council election, trustees to the Calgary Board of Education, Calgary Catholic School District, two plebiscites and the Alberta Senate nominee election.

Incumbent Mayor Al Duerr was re-elected defeating Alderman Ray Clark, and each incumbent Alderman was re-elected.

== Background ==
Calgary City Council approved a vote on a question on whether Calgarians continued to support water fluoridation following the 1989 plebiscite which saw fluoride first introduced. Plebiscites had previously failed to garner sufficient support in 1957, 1961 1966, and 1971. The Calgary Regional Health Authority promoted the fluoridation campaign, spending $250,000 on advertising and other measures. Opponents proposed to take legal action when pro-fluoride posters were on display at a voting station on election day which anti-fluoride groups charged was illegal.

The second vote on a question put to Calgary voters was whether video lottery terminals (VLTs) should be removed by the provincial government, or whether the decision to remove VLTs from Calgary should remain with City Council. The plebiscite was held in 28 municipalities across Alberta after the provincial government increased access to VLTs, increasing the number present in the province from 500 in 1997 to 2,200 in 1998. Prominent Calgary oilman Jim Gray was an advocate for the removal of the VLTs, while casinos and restaurant groups advocated for VLTs to remain. Incumbent Mayor Duerr supported the provincial government removing the VLTs while the main challenger Clark supported keeping VLTs in the city and leaving the decision to council.

A police investigation followed a bomb threat to incumbent Ward 13 alderman Sue Higgins written on a ballot cast during the election.

== Results ==
- Election results from Calgary Herald.

=== Mayor ===
	Votes	%
Al Duerr	182,780	%
Ray Clark	43,242	%
Rick Bell	20,812	%
Ron Wise	1,097	%
Doug Service	755	%
Jerzyk Jamroziak	728	%
Floyd D. Allen	690	%
Total		

=== Ward 1 ===
Candidate	Votes	Percent
Dale Hodges	16,636	
Robin Elford	4,187	
Barb Taylor-Daigarno	1,780	
Jason Seitanidis	725	
Peter Manousos	489	

=== Ward 2 ===
Candidate	Votes	Percent
Joanne Kerr	Acclaimed	

=== Ward 3 ===
Candidate	Votes	Percent
John Schmal	13,065	
Carrie Donahue	2,740	
Derrik Thomas Meyer	1,291	

=== Ward 4 ===
Candidate	Votes	Percent
Robert Andrew Hawkesworth	11,830	
David H. Chambers	2,431	
Edward R. Peebles	841	

=== Ward 5 ===
Candidate	Votes	Percent
Ray Jones	11,061	
Francis A. Byron	2,704	

=== Ward 6 ===
Candidate	Votes	Percent
Dave Bronconnier	10,691	
Craig Burrows	4,322	
James Donald Istvanffy	3,491	
Janyce Konkin	1,921	

=== Ward 7 ===
Candidate	Votes	Percent
Bev Longstaff	10,638	
Augustine Joseph Barron	5,161	

=== Ward 8 ===
Candidate	Votes	Percent
Jon Lord	6,397	
Robert Victor Lang	3,650	
Luba Arko	671	

=== Ward 9 ===
Candidate	Votes	Percent
Joseph Anthony Ceci	9,075	
Shirley-anne Reuben	5,074	
Stanley Gabriel Waciak	882	

=== Ward 10 ===
Candidate	Votes	Percent
Diane Lynn Danielson	6,318	
Andre R. Chabot	2,455	
Kevin John Montgomery	1,443	
Amir Hernani	1,083	
Bastiaan Quist	483	

=== Ward 11 ===
Candidate	Votes	Percent
James Barry Erskine	Acclaimed	

=== Ward 12 ===
Candidate	Votes	Percent
Suzanne Higgins	14,360	
Richard William McIver	2,711	
Tim Rollans	2,375	
Albert Ludwig	908	
Gareth Evans	371	

=== Ward 13 ===
Candidate	Votes	Percent
Patti Grier	12,859	
Diane Marie Colley-Urquhart	8,171	

=== Ward 14 ===
Candidate	Votes	Percent
Linda J. Fox-Mellway	12,294	
Diana Fitzpatrick	3,271	
Andrew Neufeld	2,936	
Blaine Chornawka	2,380	
Randy Reynolds	461	

=== Plebiscites ===
==== Fluoridation ====
Calgarians were asked "Are you in favour of continuing the fluoridation of the municipal water supply? YES or NO."

Candidate	Votes	Percent
Yes	136,393	
No	113,730	

==== VLTs ====
Calgarians were asked "Should The City of Calgary request that the Provincial Government take appropriate action to remove all video lottery terminals from our city? YES or No."

Candidate	Votes	Percent
Yes	104,999	
No	144,281	

== See also ==
- List of Calgary municipal elections
