= Andre Chabot =

Canadian politician

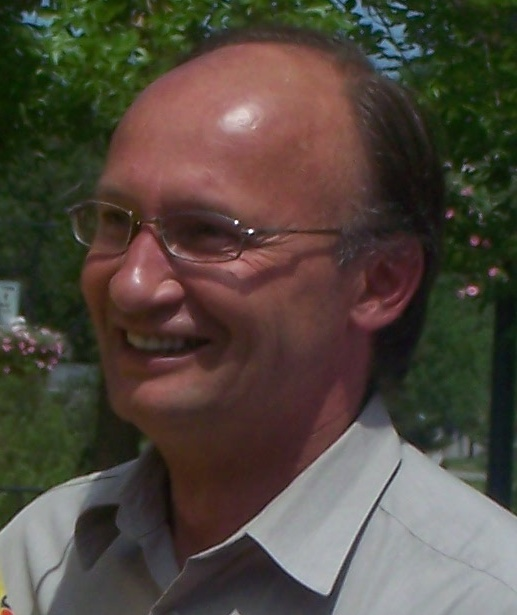

City of Calgary Councillor
- Incumbent
- Assumed office October 25, 2021
- Preceded by: Ray Jones
- Constituency: Ward 10

City of Calgary Councillor
- In office February 28, 2005 – October 16, 2017
- Preceded by: Margot Aftergood
- Constituency: Ward 10

Personal details
- Party: Communities First
- Education: DeVry Institute of Technology
- Website: City of Calgary Ward 10

André Chabot is a Canadian politician who has served as the councillor for Ward 10 of the Calgary City Council for 6 terms. He was elected in a 2005 by-election after Incumbent Margot Aftergood resigned after allegations of a vote rigging scandal surfaced involving mail in ballots from the 2004 Calgary municipal elections.

Chabot currently represents the residential northeast communities of Abbeydale, Coral Springs, Marlborough, Marlborough Park, Mayland Heights, Pineridge, Rundle, Temple, Vista Heights, Whitehorn, and the industrial communities of McCall, North Airways, South Airways, Horizon, Sunridge, Franklin, Meridian and Mayland.

Prior to the 2017 ward boundary changes, he represented Abbeydale, Albert Park/Radisson Heights, Applewood, Forest Heights, Forest Lawn, Marlborough, Marlborough Park, Penbrooke Meadows and Red Carpet, in the city's southeast quadrant. This also included the industrial communities of Mayland, Mayland Heights, Vista Heights, Franklin, Southview, Erin Woods, Eastfield, Forest Lawn Industrial, Belvedere, and Twinhills.

== Early life and career ==
Chabot grew up on a farm in Saskatchewan before moving to Northeast Calgary in 1971. Prior to politics, he was a small business owner in both the construction and electronics industry.

Chabot served as an executive board member and as President of the Marlborough Park Community Association for 10+ years.

== Electoral record ==
Chabot first entered politics in the 1998 election with an unsuccessful run to represent Ward 10 at the municipal level. He came in second to Diane Danielson with 21% of the vote, to her 54%.

His next attempt to represent Ward 10 was in the 2001 election and was an unsuccessful 41% of the vote to Diane Danielson's 59%.

=== 2004 municipal election / 2005 municipal by-election ===
Chabo ran unsuccessfully in the 2004 election to represent Ward 10 and came in third with 19% of the votes. Chabot was elected to serve Ward 10 in the 2005 by-election.

=== 2007 municipal election ===
Chabot was re-elected to represent Ward 10 in the 2007 election by capturing 89% of the votes.

=== 2010 municipal election ===
Chabot was re-elected to represent Ward 10 in the 2010 election by capturing 78% of the votes.

=== 2013 municipal election ===
Chabot was re-elected to represent Ward 10 in the 2013 election by capturing 86% of the votes.

=== 2017 municipal election ===
On June 25, 2015, Chabot announced he intended to run for mayor of Calgary in the 2017 municipal election. His bid was ultimately unsuccessful. He came in third, with controversy surrounding the election centered on flawed polling methodology and the poll's impact on his candidacy.

In January 2021, Chabot announced he would run for the Ward 10 councillor seat in the 2021 Calgary municipal election.

=== 2021 municipal election ===
Chabot was re-elected to represent Ward 10 in the 2021 election, against 10 other candidates, with a 33% vote.

=== 2025 municipal election ===
Chabot was re-elected to represent Ward 10 in the 2025 election, against 3 other candidates, with a 55% vote under the Communities First banner.

== Political career ==
In 2006, Chabot opposed the change to the Bad Behaviour bylaw that would have added spitting as an offence in addition to public urination and defecation.

In 2007, he pushed for a bylaw to allow ashtrays at entry points into public buildings in an effort to avoid garbage created by discarded butts.

In 2011, Chabot introduced the conversion of diesel buses to natural gas, which included building a facility to store and refuel that fleet.

In 2013, Chabot introduced the motion for a 17th Avenue/International Avenue area redevelopment plan.

He also initiated the development of East regional context study and Belvedere area structure plan.

In 2024, Chabot voted against upzoning Calgary to permit duplexes, rowhouses and fourplexes on lots previously zoned exclusively for single-family detached housing. Chabot said the proposal intended to alleviate the housing shortage without selecting appropriate areas that target access to transit and other services in Calgary was "the worst decision that this council, any council I've ever sat on, has ever made." In 2026, Chabot led the successful effort to repeal the upzoning.
