= Abbeydale =

Abbeydale may refer to:

== Canada ==
- Abbeydale, Calgary, a neighbourhood in Calgary, Canada

== United Kingdom ==
- Abbeydale, Gloucestershire
- Abbeydale, South Yorkshire
- Abbeydale, Worcestershire, a district of Redditch

== Other ==
- Abbeydale Industrial Hamlet, an industrial museum in the City of Sheffield, England
