= Calgary-Fort =

Defunct provincial electoral district in Alberta, Canada

Coordinates: 51.00°N 113.967°W

Alberta electoral district
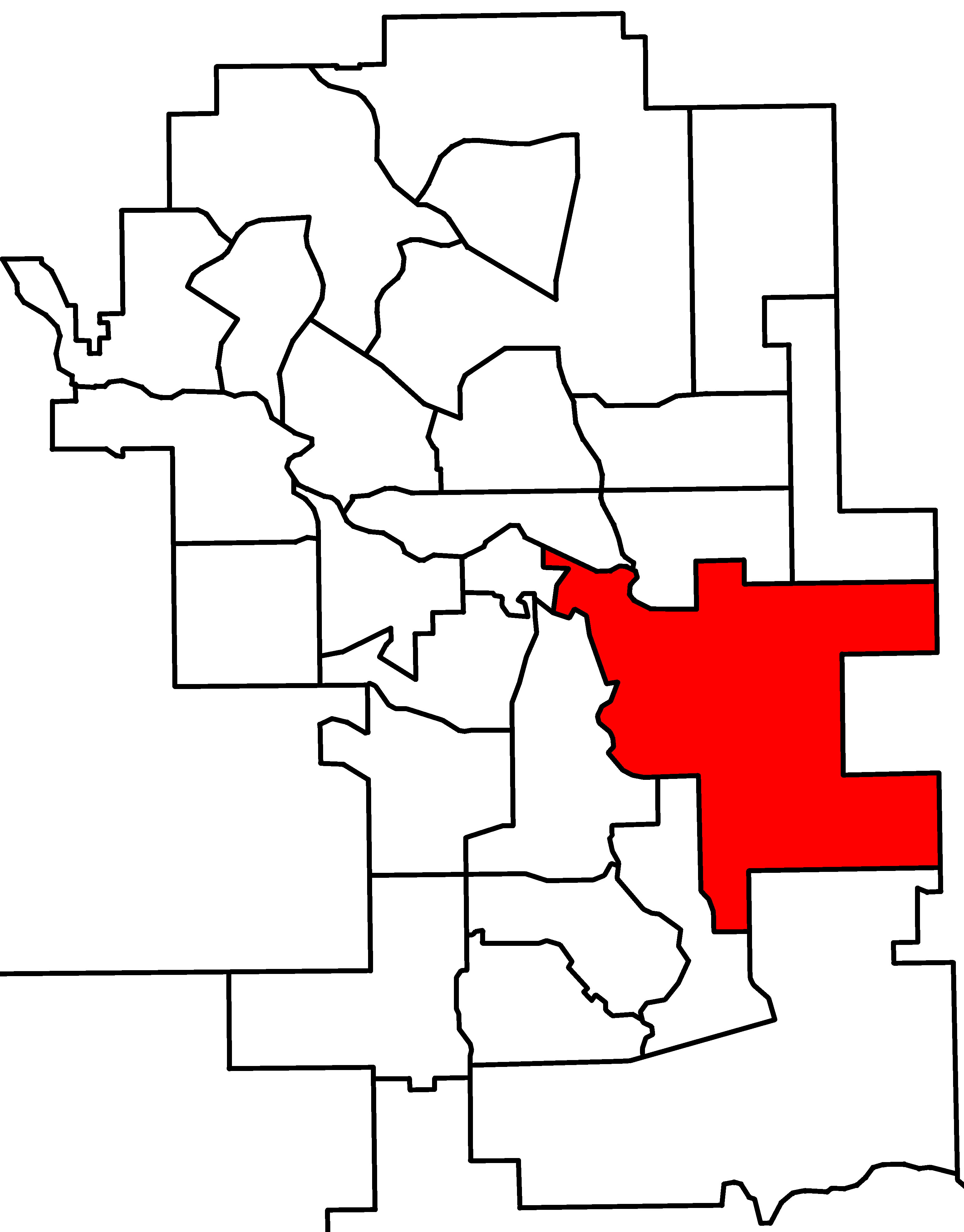
- 2010 boundaries

Defunct provincial electoral district
- Legislature: Legislative Assembly of Alberta
- District created: 1996
- District abolished: 2017
- First contested: 1997
- Last contested: 2015

Calgary-Fort was a provincial electoral district in Alberta, Canada, mandated to return a single member to the Legislative Assembly of Alberta using the first past the post method of voting from 1997 to 2019.

== History ==
The Riding covers some of the cities older blue collar neighbourhoods including Forest Lawn, Dover, Inglewood, Lynwood Ridge, Ogden, Erin Woods and the Foothills Industrial Park. The riding was largely broken with three distinct residential sections surrounded by industrial areas.

The riding suffered from a number of environmental problems in recent years caused by heavy industry. Soil contamination from the old oil refinery in Lynwood Ridge has created a ghost town of houses in limbo. Canadian Pacific Railway has also been to blame for heavy soil contamination affecting residents along the tracks in Ogden by a chemical known as Trichloroethylene used as a track degreaser. In 1999 the Hub Oil refinery just east of Erin Woods exploded raining contamination on the neighbourhood. The riding also has a quarantined site where the Inglewood Refinery used to be for soil contamination problems.

The riding had been a Progressive Conservative stronghold and was held continuously by PC MLA Wayne Cao since its creation in 1997 until the 2015 election, when the riding was won by New Democrat Joe Ceci.

=== Boundary history ===
The electoral district was created in the 1996 boundary re-distribution out of Calgary-East and named after the historical Fort Calgary.

The riding had significant changes in the 2010 Alberta boundary re-distribution, and was expanded to meet the new boundaries of the city of Calgary and gained some rural portions that had belonged to Foothills-Rocky View. The electoral district also gained the neighbourhoods of Ramsay that was previously in Calgary-Egmont and East Village which was in Calgary-Buffalo. The riding also expanded south into industrial land that was formerly part of Calgary-Hays.

The Calgary-Fort electoral district was dissolved in the 2017 electoral boundary re-distribution into Calgary-Peigan ahead of the 2019 Alberta general election.

11 Calgary-Fort 2003 boundaries
Bordering districts
North	East	West	South
Calgary-Mountain View, Calgary-East, Calgary-Montrose	Airdrie-Chestermere	Calgary-Buffalo, Calgary-Egmont	Calgary-Egmont, Calgary-Hays
riding map goes here			
Legal description from the Statutes of Alberta 2003, Electoral Divisions Act
Starting at the intersection of the left bank of the Elbow River with the right bank of the Bow River; then 1. southeast along the right bank of the Bow River to the westerly extension of 26 Avenue SE; 2. east along the extension and 26 Avenue SE to 36 Street SE; 3. north along 36 Street SE to 8 Avenue SE; 4. east along 8 Avenue SE to 52 Street SE; 5. south along 52 Street SE to 17 Avenue SE; 6. east along 17 Avenue SE to the east Calgary city boundary; 7. south along the east Calgary city boundary to Glenmore Trail SE; 8. west and northwest along Glenmore Trail SE to the right bank of the Bow River; 9. north along the right bank of the Bow River to the Canadian Pacific Railway (CPR) line; 10. in a north westerly direction along the CPR line to the left bank of the Elbow River; 11. downstream along the left bank of the Elbow River to the starting point.

12 Calgary-Fort 2010 boundaries
Bordering districts
North	East	West	South
Calgary-East, Calgary-Greenway and Calgary-Mountain View	Chestermere-Rocky View	Calgary-Acadia, Calgary-Buffalo and Calgary-Hays	Calgary-South East
Legal description from the Statutes of Alberta 2010, Electoral Divisions Act

=== Electoral history ===
Calgary-Fort
Assembly	Years	Member	Party
Riding created from Calgary-Buffalo, Calgary-East and Calgary-Egmont
24th	1997–2001	Wayne Cao	Progressive Conservative
25th	2001–2004	Wayne Cao	Progressive Conservative
26th	2004–2008	Wayne Cao	Progressive Conservative
27th	2008–2012	Wayne Cao	Progressive Conservative
28th	2012–2015	Wayne Cao	Progressive Conservative
29th	2015–2019	Joe Ceci	New Democratic
Riding dissolved into Calgary-Acadia, Calgary-Buffalo, Calgary-East and Calgary-Peigan

The electoral district of Calgary-Fort was created in the boundary re-distribution of 1997. The district covers central southeast Calgary and was carved primarily from Calgary-East. Progressive Conservative Wayne Cao won the district in the first election held in 1997 with just under half the popular vote.

Cao would run for his second term in 2001 and win a landslide victory winning almost 69% of the popular vote over a crowded field of eight candidates. He was re-elected in 2004 with a significantly reduced margin of victory taking just over half the popular vote.

Cao stood for a fourth term in the 2008 election and for the first time since 1997 he won less than half of the popular vote in one of the lowest voter turnout races in the province. Cao would retire prior to the 2015 Alberta general election which saw New Democrat and former Calgary Councillor Joe Ceci elected in Calgary-Fort.

== Legislative election results ==
1997 Alberta general election
Party	Candidate	Votes	%	±%
Progressive Conservative	Wayne Cao	4,410	48.82%	–
Liberal	Shirley-Anne Reuben	2,817	31.18%	–
Social Credit	Bren Blanchet	916	10.14%	–
New Democratic	Ken Sahil	891	9.86%	–
Total		9,034	–	–
Rejected, spoiled and declined		53	–	–
Eligible electors / turnout		21,947	41.40%	–
Progressive Conservative pickup new district.				
Source(s) Source: "Calgary-Fort Official Results 1997 Alberta general election". Alberta Heritage Community Foundation. "1997 General Election". Elections Alberta.

2001 Alberta general election
Party	Candidate	Votes	%	±%
Progressive Conservative	Wayne Cao	6,740	68.59%	19.77%
Liberal	Brian Huskins	2,004	20.39%	-10.79%
New Democratic	Vinay Dey	501	5.10%	-4.76%
Social Credit	R. Chick Hurst	160	1.63%	-8.51%
Greens	Michael Alvarez-Toye	121	1.23%	–
Independent	Metro Peter Demchynski	102	1.04%	–
Independent	Brian Slater	100	1.02%	–
Alberta First	Wyatt McIntyre	99	1.01%	–
Total		9,827	–	–
Rejected, spoiled and declined		43	–	–
Eligible electors / turnout		22,882	43.13%	1.73%
Progressive Conservative hold		Swing		15.28%
Source(s) Source: "Calgary-Fort Official Results 2001 Alberta general election". Alberta Heritage Community Foundation. "2001 Statement of Official results Calgary-Fort" (PDF). Elections Alberta.

2004 Alberta general election
Party	Candidate	Votes	%	±%
Progressive Conservative	Wayne Cao	4,137	53.86%	-14.73%
Liberal	Gerry Hart	1,786	23.25%	2.86%
New Democratic	Elizabeth A. Thomas	584	7.60%	2.50%
Alberta Alliance	Travis P. Chase	524	6.82%	–
Greens	Tyler Charkie	439	5.72%	4.48%
Separation	Leo Ollenberger	211	2.75%	1.71%^{1}
Total		7,681	–	–
Rejected, spoiled and declined		88	–	–
Eligible electors / turnout		23,271	33.38%	-9.75%
Progressive Conservative hold		Swing		-8.79%
Source(s) Source: "Calgary-Fort Official Results 2004 Alberta general election". Alberta Heritage Community Foundation. "Calgary-Fort Statement of Official Results 2004 Alberta general election" (PDF). Elections Alberta. Note: 1. Results change compared to Alberta First Party in the 2001 general election.

2008 Alberta general election
Party	Candidate	Votes	%	±%
Progressive Conservative	Wayne Cao	4,123	49.81%	−4.08%
Liberal	Carole Oliver	1,770	21.39%	−1.86
New Democratic	Julie Hrdlicka	1,178	14.23%	6.63%
Wildrose Alliance	Travis Chase	715	8.64%	1.82%
Green	Mark Taylor	491	5.93%	0.21%
Total		8,277		
Rejected, Spoiled and Declined		32		
Eligible electors / Turnout		28,974	28.68%	
Progressive Conservative hold		Swing		−2.97%
Source: "Calgary-Fort Statement of Official Results 2008 Alberta general election" (PDF). Elections Alberta. pp. 210–212.

2012 Alberta general election
Party	Candidate	Votes	%	±%
Progressive Conservative	Wayne Cao	4,855	40.94%	16.03%
Wildrose	Jeevan Mangat	4,711	39.73%	35.41%
Liberal	Said Abdulbaki	1,180	9.95%	-0.74%
New Democratic	Don Monroe	796	6.71%	-0.40%
Evergreen	Janice Dixon	317	2.67%	-0.30%
Total		11,859	–	–
Rejected, spoiled and declined		110	–	–
Eligible electors / turnout		27,215	43.98%	-17.25%
Progressive Conservative hold		Swing		-6.50%
Source(s) Source: "12 - Calgary-Fort Official Results 2012 Alberta general election". officialresults.elections.ab.ca. Elections Alberta.

2015 Alberta general election
Party	Candidate	Votes	%	±%
New Democratic	Joe Ceci	7,027	49.77%	43.05%
Progressive Conservative	Andy Bao Nguyen	3,204	22.69%	-18.25%
Wildrose	Jeevan Mangat	3,003	21.27%	-18.46%
Liberal	Said Abdulbaki	476	3.37%	-6.58%
Alberta Party	Vic Goosen	410	2.90%	–
Total		14,120	–	–
Rejected, spoiled and declined		114	–	–
Eligible electors / turnout		32,411	43.92%	-0.06%
New Democratic gain from Progressive Conservative		Swing		12.93%
Source(s) Source: "12 - Calgary-Fort Official Results 2015 Alberta general election". officialresults.elections.ab.ca. Elections Alberta.

== Senate nominee election results ==
=== 2004 ===
2004 Senate nominee election results: Calgary-Fort				Turnout 33.21%	
Affiliation	Candidate	Votes	% votes	% ballots	Rank
Progressive Conservative	Bert Brown	3,587	16.92%	52.83%	1
Progressive Conservative	Betty Unger	2,797	13.19%	41.23%	2
Progressive Conservative	Jim Silye	2,665	12.57%	39.28%	5
Progressive Conservative	Cliff Breitkreuz	2,274	10.73%	33.52%	3
Progressive Conservative	David Usherwood	2,028	9.57%	29.89%	6
Independent	Link Byfield	1,869	8.82%	27.55%	4
Independent	Tom Sindlinger	1,511	7.13%	22.27%	9
Alberta Alliance	Vance Gough	1,509	7.12%	22.24%	8
Alberta Alliance	Michael Roth	1,491	7.03%	21.98%	7
Alberta Alliance	Gary Horan	1,470	6.92%	21.67%	10
Total votes		21,201	100%		
Total ballots		6,784	3.13 votes per ballot		
Rejected, spoiled and declined		945			
23,271 eligible electors

Voters had the option of selecting four candidates on the ballot.

== Student vote results ==
=== 2004 ===
Participating schools
Ian Bazalgette Jr. High School
Sherwood School

On November 19, 2004, a student vote was conducted at participating Alberta schools to parallel the 2004 Alberta general election results. The vote was designed to educate students and simulate the electoral process for persons who had not yet reached the legal majority. The vote was conducted in 80 of the 83 provincial electoral districts, with students voting for actual election candidates. Schools with a large student body who reside in another electoral district had the option to vote for candidates outside of the electoral district than where they were physically located.

2004 Alberta student vote results
Affiliation	Candidate	Votes	%	
Progressive Conservative	Wayne Cao	53	38.13%	
Green	Tyler Charkie	40	28.78%	
AB	Liberal	Gerry Hart	25	17.99%
Alberta Alliance	Travis Chase	8	5.75%	
Separation	Leo Ollenberger	7	5.04%	
New Democratic	Elizabeth Thomas	6	4.31%	
Total		139	100%	
Rejected, spoiled and declined		0		

=== 2012 ===
2012 Alberta student vote results
Affiliation	Candidate	Votes	%
Progressive Conservative	Jason Luan		%
Wildrose	Jeevan Mangat		%
Liberal	Said Abdulbaki		%
New Democratic	Don Monroe		%
Social Credit			%
Total			100%

== See also ==
- List of Alberta provincial electoral districts
- Canadian provincial electoral districts
