= 2007 Calgary municipal election =

Election in Alberta, Canada

← 2004	October 15, 2007	2010 →

Mayor and 12 of 14 aldermen to Calgary City Council
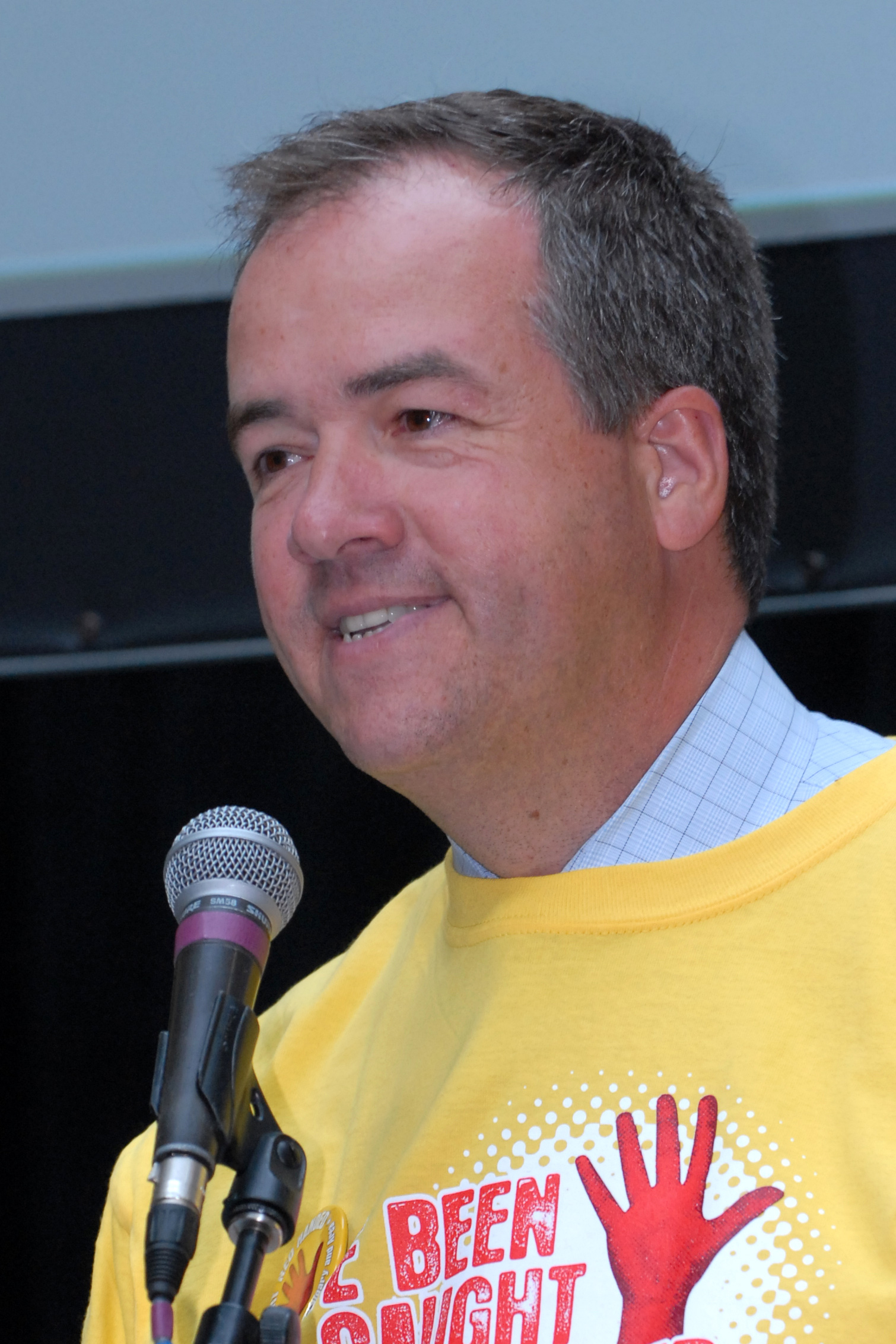
		A. K.
Leader	Dave Bronconnier	Alnoor Kassam
Popular vote	128,112	35,442
Percentage	61.08%	16.90%
Mayor before election
Dave Bronconnier
Elected mayor
Dave Bronconnier

The 2007 Calgary municipal election was held Monday, October 15, 2007. The citizens of Calgary elected one mayor, 12 of their 14 aldermen (one from each of 14 wards) to the city council, five of the seven Calgary School District trustees (each representing 2 of 14 wards), and three of the seven Calgary Catholic School District trustees (each representing 2 of 14 wards). All but one of the incumbent councillors ran again in this election (Barry Erskine, of Ward 11), and two incumbents were returned by acclamation. Five of the incumbent public school trustees ran again, two were acclaimed, and four separate school incumbent trustees ran, three were acclaimed, while Ward 13/14 had only one new candidate. Since 1968, provincial legislation has required every municipality to hold triennial elections.

The percent of eligible voters who voted was 33% — putting turnout at a higher level than the previous election in 2004.

== Results ==
Bold indicates elected, italics indicates incumbent.

=== Mayor ===
Mayor
Candidate	Votes	%
**Dave Bronconnier**	**128,112**	**61.08%**
Alnoor Kassam	35,442	16.90%
Sandy Jenkins	16,531	7.88%
Jeremy Zhao	8,025	3.83%
Allan Foster	6,455	3.08%
David Bertram	5,549	2.65%
Elizabeth Kaur Fielding	4,010	1.91%
Harry Heck	3,811	1.82%
J. J. Sunstrum	1,813	0.86%

=== Aldermen ===
Aldermen
Ward 1			Ward 2			Ward 3			Ward 4		
Candidate	Votes	%	Candidate	Votes	%	Candidate	Votes	%	Candidate	Votes	%
**Dale Hodges**	**12,059**	**56.1%**	**Gord Lowe**	**10,269**	**61.1%**	**Jim Stevenson**	**5,452**	**36.86**	**Bob Hawkesworth**	**10,555**	**73.9%**
Jennifer Banks	8,579	39.9%	Joe Magliocca	3,979	23.7%	George Chahal	5,419	36.64	Richard Evans	2,632	18.4%
Normand Perrault	869	4.0%	Terry Avramenko	2,242	13.3%	Helene Larocque	3,919	26.50	Alex Peterson	1,088	7.6%
Ward 5			Daniel M. Del Re	312	1.9%	Ward 6			Ward 7		
**Ray Jones**	**7,590**	**79.6%**				**Joe Connelly**	**9,068**	**46.6%**	**Druh Farrell**	**8,998**	**68.9%**
Mohamed El-Rafih	1,945	20.4%				Craig Burrows	6,594	33.9%	Barry Elridge	2,249	17.2%
Ward 8			Ward 9			James Donald Istvanffy	2,732	14.0%	Merle Terlesky	1,280	9.8%
**John Mar**	**4,014**	**31.6%**	**Joe Ceci**	**7,213**	**56.6%**	James Kohut	852	4.4%	Jag Aithal	532	4.1%
Madeline King	3,847	30.3%	Al Koenig	4,962	38.9%	Rosemary Berglund	205	1.1%			
Steve Chapman	3,430	27.0%	Stan Waciak	572	4.5%	Ward 10			Ward 11		
Lindsay Luhnau	1,412	11.1%				**Andre Chabot**	**8,263**	**88.6%**	**Brian Pincott**	**6,037**	**34.2%**
						Nargis Dossa	1,064	11.4%	Evonne Whelan	4,490	25.4%
Ward 12			Ward 13			Ward 14			James M. Murray	3,353	19.0%
**Richard William McIver**	**16,700**	**91.1%**	**Diane Colley-Urquhart**	**Acclaimed**		**Linda Fox-Mellway**	**Acclaimed**		Dave Matthews	2,241	12.7%
Nick Halfyard	1,634	8.9%							Jim Rockwell	1,539	8.7%

=== Public School Trustees ===
Calgary School District
Ward 1/2			Ward 3/4			Ward 5/10		
Candidate	Votes	%	Candidate	Votes	%	Candidate	Votes	%
**Gordon Dirks**	**Acclaimed**		**Lynn C. Ferguson**	**14,326**	**73.6%**	**Pamela King**	**8,927**	**73.2%**
			Jadine Kohut	5,136	26.4%	Michael P. Stefanyshyn	3,273	26.8%
Ward 6/7			Ward 8/9			Ward 11/13		
**George S. Lane**	**9,039**	**45.8%**	**Pat Cochrane**	**Acclaimed**		**Karen Kryczka**	**7,990**	**38.2%**
Greg Scott	6,707	34.0%	Ward 12/14			Deborah Duncan	5,778	27.6%
Drake Hammill	3,976	20.2%	**Carol Bazinet**	**13,720**	**69.6%**	Neil Mackie	3,752	17.9%
			Gregory C. Humphreys	5,998	30.4%	Kathy Power	3,383	16.2%

=== Separate School Trustees ===
Calgary Catholic School District
Ward 1/2/Cochrane			Ward 3/5/Airdrie			Ward 4/7		
**Serafino Scarpino**	**Acclaimed**		**Linda Wellman**	**Acclaimed**		**Margaret Belcourt**	**Acclaimed**	
Ward 6/8			Ward 9/10/Chestermere			Ward 11/12		
Candidate	Votes	%	Candidate	Votes	%	Candidate	Votes	%
**Lois H. Burke-Gaffney**	**4,564**	**66.4%**	**Rosemarie Goerlitz**	**3,691**	**62.7%**	**Michael V. Annuik**	**6,033**	**82.4%**
Antoni (Tony) Grochowski	2,313	33.6%	Gerald A.J. Heighes	1,673	28.4%	Cathie Williams	1,287	17.6%
Ward 13/14			Michael O'Malley	520	8.8%			
**Mary Martin**	**Acclaimed**							

== Key Issues ==
Some of the prominent issues receiving public attention include the following (listed in alphabetical order):

=== Crime ===
Recent high-profile violent crimes in Calgary had generated public concern for safety in the city.

=== Environment ===
Calgary has the highest per capita ecological footprint amongst Canada's larger cities. The City has concentrated past efforts on increasing community water conservation and reducing its corporate GHG emissions. Community goals to reduce the community's ecological footprint were identified through the Imagine Calgary process. These were intended to form the basis for comprehensive community-based initiatives to reduce the per capita ecological footprint.

=== Housing ===
There was an ongoing shortage of housing in the city. That, combined with what was among the highest rates of growth in housing costs in Canada, had made housing a significant issue for the public.

=== Infrastructure ===
A week before the election, the provincial government agreed to provide $3.3 billion for infrastructure in Calgary over the next 10 years. It would be up to city council to allocate those funds.

=== Transportation ===
- Disruption of roads, paths and sidewalks due to construction.
- Public transit infrastructure.
- Increasing motor-vehicle congestion.

=== Voter participation ===
Voter turnout in the previous Calgary municipal election was 19.8%, while in the 2001 municipal elections it was 38%.

== Controversies ==
- Campaign finance.

=== Regarding specific candidates ===
- Sandy Jenkins was forcibly ejected from the University of Calgary MacEwan Hall Ballroom by security during a Weakerthans concert which he sneaked in after not having paid for a ticket.
- Dave Bronconnier's fundraising has raised concerns about the impact of funding on the campaign.
- Craig Burrows (incumbent, Ward 6) was the Chair of the City Audit Committee. He was approved to take a University of Calgary business management course which would provide assistance to him in his role on the Audit Committee. He was later asked to repay the course fee, which he did indirectly through a reduction in his spending in the subsequent year.
- Mayoral candidate Alnoor Kassam was reported to have spent a million dollars of his own money on his campaign, which led to allegations that his money had been acquired in illegal or unethical manners. Columnist Don Braid attempted to connect him to a banking scandal in Kenya prior to moving to Canada. While Kassam did admit that the local political culture required regular bribes in order to do business, he noted that a Canadian immigration tribunal had completely exonerated him. He insisted that he did not take money when leaving Kenya, but had made his entire current fortune in Calgary. News articles also accused Kassam of attempting economic evictions in a Mount Royal apartment building, although he apparently also supported residents in finding other housing.
