= 2001 Calgary municipal election =

- October 15, 2001

Mayor and 14 aldermen to Calgary City Council
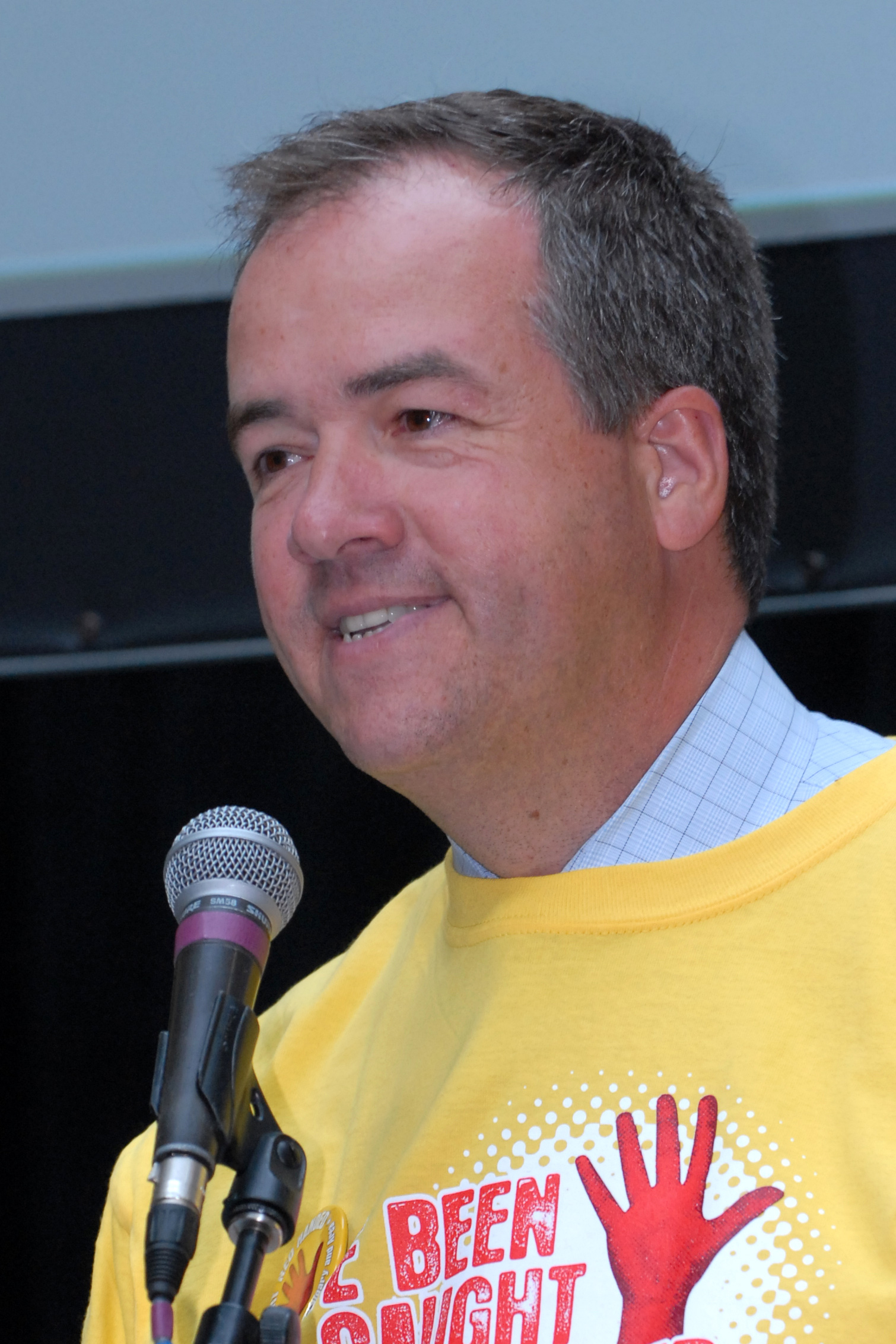
		B. L.
Leader	Dave Bronconnier	Bev Longstaff
Popular vote	62,745	58,537
Percentage	28.3%	26.4%
	R. M.	R. C.
Leader	Richard Magnus	Ray Clark
Popular vote	49,884	45,506
Percentage	22.5%	20.5%
Mayor before election
Al Duerr
Elected mayor
Dave Bronconnier

The 2001 Calgary municipal election was held on October 15, 2001, to elect a Mayor and 14 Aldermen to Calgary City Council. Three term Calgary Aldermen Dave Bronconnier won 28 per cent of the vote defeating four term Aldermen Bev Longstaff and fifteen other candidates to become the 35th Mayor of Calgary.

== Results ==
=== Mayor ===
	Votes	%
Dave Bronconnier	62,745	28.3%
Bev Longstaff	58,537	26.4%
Richard Magnus	49,884	22.5%
Ray Clark	45,506	20.5%
Allan Hunter	1,461	0.3%
Oscar Fech	584	0.2%
Douglas Allan Service	491	0.2%
Roy Allan Foster	413	0.1%
Russell Burton Ward	318	0.1%
James Leo Delay	284	0.1%
Bob Krengel	259	0.1%
Rickey Robert Boucher	258	0.1%
Brett Graham Martin	258	0.1%
Chad Hamzeh	184	0.1%
Derek John Wilken	150	0.1%
Vincent James Symington	112	0.1%
Peter Robert Sadlon	69	0.1%
Total	221,513	

=== Ward 1 ===
Candidate	Votes	Percent
Dale Hodges	Acclaimed	

=== Ward 2 ===
Candidate	Votes	Percent
Frederick Gordon Lowe	5,300	
Jason Luan	4,747	
Anne Eileen Burke	2,462	
Robert Edward Banner	1,154	
Duncan Ooko	1,139	
Han J. Kim	1,043	
Eirik Feir	494	
Marnie D. Jeffery	405	
Monica Anne Guttman	272	
Darnelda Siegers	212	
Scott Alexander McGurrin	159	
Kenneth M.S. Dauphinais	118	
Daniel M. Del Re	58	

=== Ward 3 ===
Candidate	Votes	Percent
John Schmal	8,962	
William Blair Houston	1,515	
Jerry Bruce Vague	926	

=== Ward 4 ===
Candidate	Votes	Percent
Robert Andrew Hawkesworth	13,816	
David Chambers	3,109	
Edward R. Peebles	570	

=== Ward 5 ===
Candidate	Votes	Percent
Ray Jones	6,917	
William Calvin Garth	1,888	
Francis A. Byron	1,268	

=== Ward 6 ===
Candidate	Votes	Percent
Craig Burrows	5,485	
James Donald Istvanffy	4,115	
Kirk Ryan	2,637	
Gary Andrew Swinamer	2,583	
J. W. MacDonald	1,825	
Charles Edward MacKinnon	1,638	
David Charles McKee	625	
Robert James Hogan	243	

=== Ward 7 ===
Candidate	Votes	Percent
Druh Farrell	7,687	
Augustine Joseph Barron	3,565	
Margot Aftergood	2,079	
Kendrick L. Charles	1,733	
Harvey Cohen	1,214	
Jon Adams	743	
Wyatt-James Taylor McIntyre	289	

=== Ward 8 ===
Candidate	Votes	Percent
Madeleine King	2,307	
Robert Victor Lang	1,949	
Heesung Kim	1,749	
Alan George Browne	1,699	
Donald Derrell Delaney	1,648	
Lorena Dunlop	1,363	
Matt Urquhart	887	
Stephen Denis Chapman	667	
Joy Ann McKerr	351	
Gayle Anne McKenzie	235	
Art Proctor	162	

=== Ward 9 ===
Candidate	Votes	Percent
Joseph Anthony Ceci	8,497	
Le-Anna Layne Lundgren	2,350	
Stanley Gabriel Waciak	920	

=== Ward 10 ===
Candidate	Votes	Percent
Diane Lynn Danielson	5,341	
Andre R. Chabot	3,751	

=== Ward 11 ===
Candidate	Votes	Percent
James Barry Erskine	12,035	
Craig Gary Cheffins	6,311	
William Gagnon	1,390	
Dean Rocklin Schattenkirk	915	

=== Ward 12 ===
Candidate	Votes	Percent
Richard William McIver	5,513	
Warren Michael Bates	4,068	
Thomas Edward Lynch	2,996	
Arthur John Johnston	2,780	
Roderick Alexander McLeod	2,195	
Jarett Ryan Lalonde	712	

=== Ward 13 ===
Candidate	Votes	Percent
Diane Marie Colley-Urquhart	Acclaimed	

=== Ward 14 ===
Candidate	Votes	Percent
Linda J. Fox-Mellway	10,706	
Jack Zenert	3,002	
Dean Nathan Bracko	2,452	

== See also ==
- List of Calgary municipal elections
