= Calgary-Hays =

Provincial electoral district in Alberta, Canada

Coordinates: 50.94°N 113.98°W

Alberta electoral district
- Calgary-Hays within the City of Calgary, 2017 boundaries

Provincial electoral district
- Legislature: Legislative Assembly of Alberta
MLA
Ric McIver
United Conservative
- District created: 2003
- First contested: 2004
- Last contested: 2023

Calgary-Hays is a provincial electoral district mandated to return one member to the Legislative Assembly of Alberta, Canada using the first past the post method of voting.

The riding was formed in 2004, carved out of the Calgary-Shaw electoral district. The district is named after former Calgary mayor and Canadian Senator Harry Hays who represented the electoral district of Calgary South as a Member of Parliament.

In its present boundaries the electoral district covers the deep southeast corner of Calgary and includes the neighbourhoods of McKenzie Lake, McKenzie Towne, Quarry Park, Douglas Glen, and Douglasdale.

== History ==
The electoral district was created in the 2003 boundary redistribution from Calgary-Shaw. The 2010 boundary redistribution split the riding in half to form most of Calgary-South East due to significant growth of new communities in the southeast quadrant of Calgary.

=== Boundary history ===
13 Calgary-Hays 2003 boundaries
Bordering districts
North	East	West	South
Calgary-Fort, Calgary-Egmont	Airdrie-Chestermere	Calgary-Egmont, Calgary-Fish Creek, Calgary-Shaw, Highwood	Highwood
riding map goes here			
Legal description from the Statutes of Alberta 2003, Electoral Divisions Act.
Starting at the intersection of Barlow Trail SE with Glenmore Trail SE; then 1. east along Glenmore Trail SE to the Calgary city boundary; 2. generally south and west along the city boundary to the right bank of the Bow River; 3. north along the right bank of the Bow River to the north boundary of Sec. 13, Twp. 23, Rge. 1 W5; 4. east along the north boundary of Sec. 13 and the north boundary of Sec. 16 in Twp. 23, Rge. 29 W4 to Barlow Trail SE; 5. north along Barlow Trail SE to the starting point.
Note: New District

16 Calgary-Hays 2010 boundaries
Bordering districts
North	East	West	South
Calgary-Fort	Calgary-Fort and Calgary-South East	Calgary-Fish Creek and Calgary-Shaw	Calgary-South East
Legal description from the Statutes of Alberta 2010, Electoral Divisions Act.

=== Electoral history ===
Members of the Legislative Assembly for Calgary-Hays
Assembly	Years	Member	Party
See Calgary-Shaw 1993-2004
26th	2004–2008	Arthur Johnston	Progressive Conservative
27th	2008–2012	Arthur Johnston	Progressive Conservative
28th	2012–2015	Ric McIver	Progressive Conservative
29th	2015–2017	Ric McIver	Progressive Conservative
29th	2017–2019	Ric McIver	United Conservative
30th	2019–2023	Ric McIver	United Conservative
31st	2023–	Ric McIver	United Conservative

The electoral district was created in the boundary redistribution of 2004 out of Calgary-Shaw after that electoral district became one of the most populated electoral districts in Alberta.

The first election held in the district in 2004 saw Progressive Conservative candidate Arthur Johnston win the election with a landslide majority taking nearly 64% of the popular vote while the second place candidate trailed far behind with just 22%.

Johnston stood for re-election in the 2008 provincial election. He won a higher popular vote but his percentage of victory dropped as the Liberal and Wildrose Alliance candidates made gains. However Johnston held the district with almost 55% of the popular vote.

Johnston announced his retirement as incumbent after being defeated twice for the Progressive Conservative nomination in Calgary-Hays and in the new electoral district of Calgary-South East.

In 2012, PC Candidate Ric McIver defeated Wayne Anderson, contender for the Wild Rose Party, to become the second representative for the Hays district since its creation.

== Legislative election results ==
=== 2004 ===
2004 Alberta general election
Party	Candidate	Votes	%	±%
Progressive Conservative	Arthur Johnston	5,523	63.78%	–
Liberal	Sharon L. Howe	1,926	22.24%	–
Alberta Alliance	Robert Wawrzynowski	534	6.17%	–
Green	Bernie Amell	378	4.37%	–
New Democratic	Rachel Weinfeld	298	3.44%	–
Total		8,659	–	–
Rejected, spoiled and declined		29	8	2
Eligible electors / Turnout		24,936	34.85%	–
Progressive Conservative pickup new district.				
Source(s) Source: "00 - Calgary-Hays, 2004 Alberta general election". officialresults.elections.ab.ca. Elections Alberta. Alberta. Chief Electoral Officer (2005). Report of the Chief Electoral Officer on the General Enumeration and General Election of the Twenty-sixth Legislative Assembly (Report). Edmonton: Alberta Legislative Assembly, Office of the Chief Electoral Officer.

=== 2008 ===
2008 Alberta general election
Party	Candidate	Votes	%	±%
Progressive Conservative	Arthur Johnston	6,968	54.23%	-9.56%
Liberal	Bill Kurtze	3,586	27.91%	5.66%
Wildrose Alliance	Devin Cassidy	1,366	10.63%	4.46%
Green	Keely Bruce	564	4.39%	0.02%
New Democratic	Tyler Kinch	366	2.85%	-0.59%
Total		12,850	–	–
Rejected, spoiled and declined		14	14	2
Eligible electors / Turnout		34,364	37.44%	2.59%
Progressive Conservative hold		Swing		-7.61%
Source(s) Source: "13 - Calgary-Hays, 2008 Alberta general election". officialresults.elections.ab.ca. Elections Alberta. Chief Electoral Officer (2008). The Report on the March 3, 2008 Provincial General Election of the Twenty-Seventh Legislative Assembly (Report). Edmonton, Alta.: Elections Alberta.

=== 2012 ===
2012 Alberta general election
Party	Candidate	Votes	%	±%
Progressive Conservative	Ric McIver	8,621	55.09%	0.86%
Wildrose Alliance	Wayne Anderson	5,670	36.23%	25.60%
Liberal	Brian MacPhee	898	5.74%	-22.17%
New Democratic	Regina Vergara	461	2.95%	0.10%
Total		15,650	–	–
Rejected, spoiled and declined		126	55	10
Eligible electors / Turnout		28,749	54.91%	17.47%
Progressive Conservative hold		Swing		-3.73%
Source(s) Source: "16 - Calgary-Hays, 2012 Alberta general election". officialresults.elections.ab.ca. Elections Alberta. Chief Electoral Officer (2012). The Report of the Chief Electoral Officer on the 2011 Provincial Enumeration and Monday, April 23, 2012 Provincial General Election of the Twenty-eighth Legislative Assembly (PDF) (Report). Edmonton, Alta.: Elections Alberta. Archived (PDF) from the original on May 6, 2021.

=== 2015 ===
2015 Alberta general election
Party	Candidate	Votes	%	±%
Progressive Conservative	Ric McIver	6,671	38.26%	-16.83%
New Democratic	Carla Drader	5,138	29.47%	26.52%
Wildrose	Bob Mailloux	4,562	26.16%	-10.07%
Liberal	Shawn Emran	722	4.14%	-1.60%
Green	Graham Mackenzie	250	1.43%	–
Social Credit	Zachary Doyle	93	0.53%	–
Total		17,436	–	–
Rejected, spoiled and declined		28	29	6
Eligible electors / turnout		32,793	53.27%	-1.64%
Progressive Conservative hold		Swing		-5.03%
Source(s) Source: "16 - Calgary-Hays, 2015 Alberta general election". officialresults.elections.ab.ca. Elections Alberta. Chief Electoral Officer (2016). 2015 General Election. A Report of the Chief Electoral Officer (PDF) (Report). Edmonton, Alta.: Elections Alberta.

=== 2019 ===
2019 Alberta general election
Party	Candidate	Votes	%	±%	Expenditures
United Conservative	Ric McIver	14,186	63.19%	-1.23%	$56,063
New Democratic	Tory Tomblin	5,706	25.42%	-4.05%	$48,441
Alberta Party	Chris Nowell	2,052	9.14%	–	$4,184
Liberal	Frances Woytkiw	293	1.31%	-2.84%	$500
Alberta Independence	Kenneth Morrice	211	0.94%	–	$1,209
Total		22,448	–	–	
Rejected, spoiled and declined		129	53	6	
Eligible electors / turnout		34,230	65.97%	12.70%	
United Conservative hold		Swing			
Source(s) Source: Elections Alberta Note: Expenses is the sum of "Election Expenses", "Other Expenses" and "Transfers Issued". The Elections Act limits "Election Expenses" to $50,000.

=== 2023 ===
2023 Alberta general election
Party	Candidate	Votes	%	±%
United Conservative	Ric McIver	11,807	55.61	-7.59
New Democratic	Andrew Stewart	8,987	42.33	+16.91
Green	Evelyn Tanaka	321	1.51	–
Solidarity Movement	Garry Leonhardt	118	0.56	–
Total		21,233	99.38	–
Rejected and declined		133	0.62	
Turnout		21,366	60.45	
Eligible voters		35,345		
United Conservative hold		Swing		-12.25
Source(s) Source: Elections Alberta

== Senate nominee election results ==
=== 2004 ===
2004 Senate nominee election results: Calgary-Hays				Turnout 34.85%	
Affiliation	Candidate	Votes	% votes	% ballots	Rank
Progressive Conservative	Bert Brown	4,329	17.89%	57.24%	1
Progressive Conservative	Betty Unger	3,672	15.17%	48.55%	2
Progressive Conservative	Jim Silye	3,640	15.04%	48.13%	5
Progressive Conservative	David Usherwood	2,849	11.77%	37.67%	6
Progressive Conservative	Cliff Breitkreuz	2,619	10.82%	34.63%	3
Independent	Link Byfield	1,796	7.42%	23.75%	4
Alberta Alliance	Vance Gough	1,449	5.99%	19.16%	8
Alberta Alliance	Michael Roth	1,354	5.59%	17.90%	7
Independent	Tom Sindlinger	1,253	5.18%	16.57%	9
Alberta Alliance	Gary Horan	1,243	5.13%	16.44%	10
Total votes		24,204	100%		
Total ballots		7,563	3.20 votes per ballot		
Rejected, spoiled and declined		1,127			
24,936 eligible electors

Voters had the option of selecting four candidates on the ballot

== See also ==
- List of Alberta provincial electoral districts
- Canadian provincial electoral districts
