= 2004 Calgary municipal election =

Election in Alberta, Canada

- October 18, 2004

Mayor and 14 aldermen to Calgary City Council
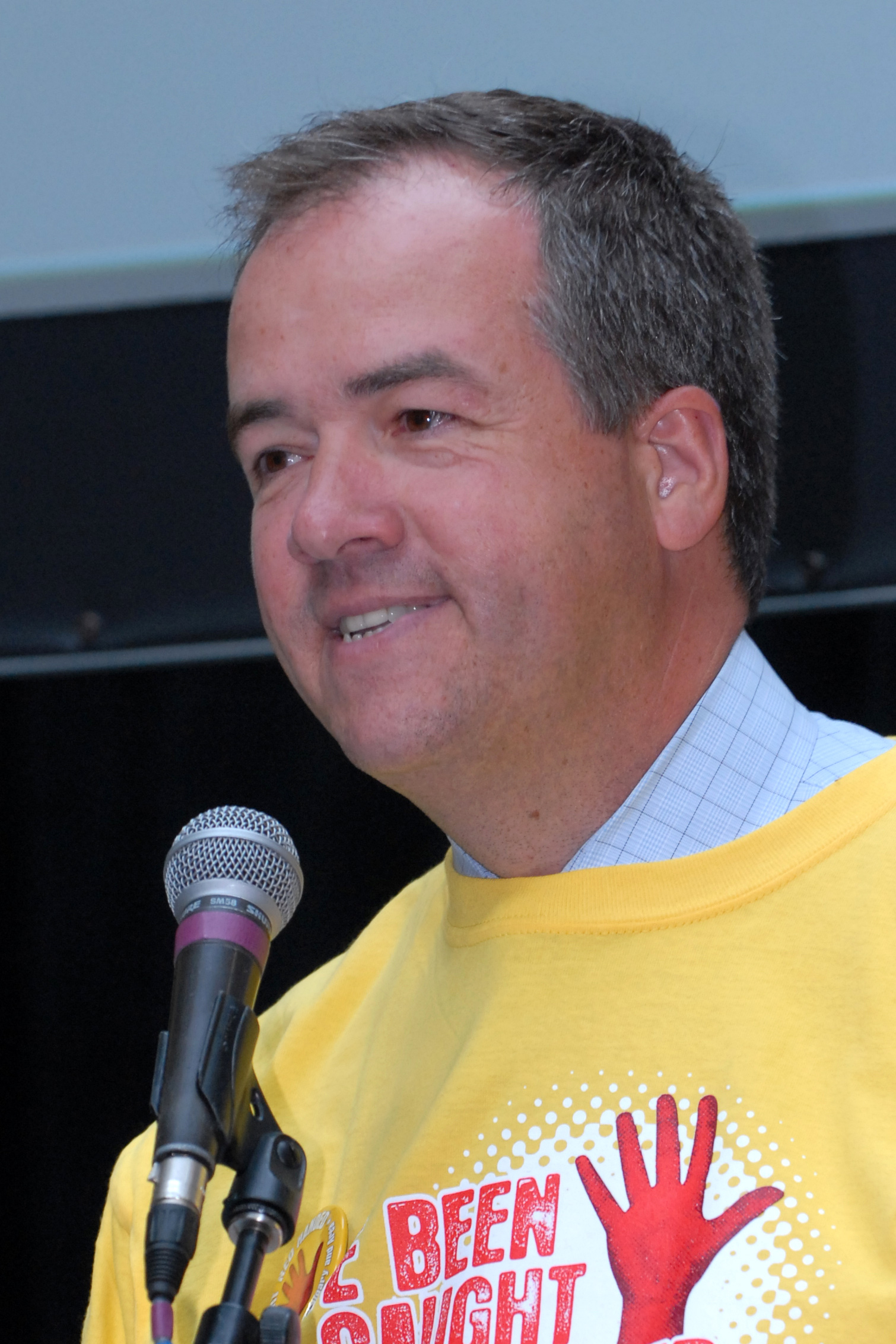
		O. F.
Leader	Dave Bronconnier	Oscar Fech
Popular vote	94,228	6,357
Percentage	81.5%	5.5%
Mayor before election
Dave Bronconnier
Elected mayor
Dave Bronconnier

The 2004 Calgary municipal election was held on October 18, 2004 to elect a Mayor and fourteen Aldermen to Calgary City Council. Only 19.81% of the population voted, making the turnout one of the lowest in Western Canadian history.

The election was highly controversial after allegations of electoral fraud by incumbent Ward 10 Alderman Margot Aftergood who subsequently resigned after the election in 2004.

== Ward 10 Controversy ==
The 2004 Calgary municipal election was the first election Calgary would allow the use of mail-in ballots. From September 29 to October 3, 2004, the City would receive 1,080 online applications for special mail-in ballots for Ward 10. Of the 1,080 requests, 1,074 originated from two computers, requesting the ballots be mailed to the same postal box "Suite 307" in a North-East Calgary strip mall. Ultimately 1,266 Special Ballot packages would be mailed to Suite 307, of which 851 were eventually submitted to the Returning Office. Of those 694 were rejected due to improper completion of the certificate envelope, and 157 which were properly completed were marked "rejected" by the Returning Officer. The final result of the Ward 10 election saw Aftergood defeat her next closest opponent Diane Danielson by 138 votes.

On October 14, the Calgary Police Service Commercial Crime and Arson unit was notified of the irregularity and began investigating. On November 11 Calgary Police executed a search warrant on Member of the Legislative Assembly of Alberta Hung Pham's home for electronic equipment after the online applications had been traced to an account at his home. Hung Pham identified the traced account holder as his sister-in-law.

On November 29, 2004 the City of Calgary and Margot Aftergood reached an agreement where she would resign her office as Alderman for Ward 10 in exchange for the City paying 60% of her legal costs. The City provided Diane Danielson the same offer, which she rejected. Calgary City Council passed a resolution on December 6, 2004 requesting the Government of Alberta convene an inquiry "into and concerning the Calgary October 2004 municipal election in Ward 10 including, but not limited to, the conduct of all Ward 10 candidates, their campaign teams and the City of Calgary elections office".

On December 29, 2004, the Minister of Municipal Affairs Rob Renner ordered an investigation into the election under Section 571 of the Municipal Government Act, which was completed by Robert C. Clark on June 22, 2005. The report concluded a significant irregularity occurred during the election involving the application for and return of Special Ballots using the names of persons who did not know that this was taking place.

Eventually, Margot Aftergood acknowledged the postal box in question was rented by her husband David Aftergood, but asserted that neither she nor her husband did anything wrong. In 2007 David Aftergood was found guilty of violating the Elections Act and was sentenced to 14 days in jail and a $2,000 fine. However, David Aftergood was granted a new trial on appeal and in January 2010, the Crown stayed charges against him. Ron Aftergood, Margot's brother and campaign volunteer Son Nguyen pleaded guilty to violating the Local Authorities Election Act and were fined $4,000 and $1,500 respectively. Charges against other accused individuals were dropped.

Andre Chabot was elected Alderman in the 2005 by-election for Ward 10.

== Results ==
=== Mayor ===
	Votes	%
Dave Bronconnier (inc.)	94,228	81.5%
Oscar Fech	6,357	5.5%
Mike Pal	4,666	4.0%
Harinder Dhillon	2,893	2.5%
Greg Lang	2,781	2.4%
Douglas Allan Service	2,678	2.3%
Antoni Grochowski	1,946	1.7%
Total	115,549	

=== Council ===
==== Ward 1 ====
Candidate	Votes	Percent
Dale Hodges	9,861	82.9%
Perrault Normand	2,041	17.1%
Total	11,902	-

==== Ward 2 ====
Candidate	Votes	Percent
Gord Lowe	8,309	87.0%
Daniel Del Re	1,244	13.0%
Total	9,553	-

==== Ward 3 ====
Candidate	Votes	Percent
Helene Larocque	2,036	21.3%
David Heyman	1,882	19.7%
Jim Stevenson	1,855	19.4%
Naheed Nenshi	1,259	13.2%
Lynn Martin	850	8.9%
Balvir Khurana	599	6.3%
Blaine Thoreson	338	3.5%
Dave Chambers	269	2.8%
Allan Hunter	217	2.3%
Francis Byron	170	1.8%
Jon Saby	69	0.7%
Total	9,544	-

==== Ward 4 ====
- Bob Hawkesworth - Acclaimed

==== Ward 5 ====
Candidate	Votes	Percent
Ray Jones	4,333	59.5%
Jag Brar	1,569	21.6%
Wil Garth	841	11.6%
Raleigh Dehaney	535	7.4%
Total	7,278	-

==== Ward 6 ====
Candidate	Votes	Percent
Craig Burrows	9,145	80.1%
James Kohut	2,275	19.9%
Total	11.420	-

==== Ward 7 ====
- Druh Farrell - Acclaimed

==== Ward 8 ====
Candidate	Votes	Percent
Madeleine King	3,040	44.0%
Steve Chapman	2,894	41.9%
Matthew Urquhart	573	8.3%
Alan Chamberlain	402	5.8%
Total	6,909	-

==== Ward 9 ====
Candidate	Votes	Percent
Joe Ceci	5,304	70.2%
Russell Welch	1,555	20.6%
Stan Waciak	696	9.2%
Total	7,555	-

==== Ward 10 ====
Candidate	Votes	Percent
Margot Aftergood	2,072	39.5%
Diane Danielson	1,934	36.9%
Andre Chabot	979	18.7%
Brad Berard	254	4.8%

==== Ward 11 ====
- Barry Erskine - Acclaimed

==== Ward 12 ====
- Ric McIver - Acclaimed

==== Ward 13 ====
Candidate	Votes	Percent
Diane Colley-Urquhart	6,485	71.6%
Bob Krengel	1,579	17.4%
Mark Dyrholm	993	11.0%
Total	9,057	-

==== Ward 14 ====
Candidate	Votes	Percent
Linda Fox-Mellway	6,122	62.0%
Brian Pincott	3,752	38.0%
Total	9,874	-

== See also ==
- List of Calgary municipal elections

== Sources ==
Official Election Results (City of Calgary newsroom)
