= Marlborough Park, Calgary =

Marlborough Park
- Neighbourhood
- Location of Marlborough Park in Calgary
- Coordinates: 51°03′37″N 113°56′53″W
- Country: Canada
- Province: Alberta
- City: Calgary
- Quadrant: NE
- Ward: 10
- Established: 1972
- Annexed: 1961

Government
  - Mayor: Jeromy Farkas
  - Administrative body: Calgary City Council
  - Councillor: Andre Chabot (Communities First)

Area
  - Total: 2.5 km^{2} (0.97 sq mi)
- Elevation: 1,065 m (3,494 ft)

Population (2006)
  - Total: 8,513
  - Average Income: $52,535
- Website: Marlborough Park Community Association

Marlborough Park is a residential neighbourhood in the northeast quadrant of Calgary, Alberta. It is bounded by 68 Street E to the east, 52 Street E to the west, Trans-Canada Highway to the north and Memorial Drive to the south. The homonymous park is located at the center of the community.

The land was annexed by the City of Calgary in 1961 and Marlborough Park was established in 1972. It is represented in the Calgary City Council by the Ward 10 councillor.

== Demographics ==
In the City of Calgary's 2021 municipal census, Marlborough Park had a population of 8,290 living in 2,870 dwellings With a land area of 2.5 km^{2} (0.97 sq mi), it had a population density of 3,320/km^{2} (8,590/sq mi) in 2021.

Residents in this community had a median household income of $81,000 in 2021, and there were 10% low income residents living in Marlborough Park. As of 2021, 38% of the residents were immigrants. A proportion of 4% of the buildings were condominiums or apartments, and 25% of the housing was used for renting.

Pop. Overtime
| Year | Population |
|---|---|
| 2014 | 8741 |
| 2015 | 8878 |
| 2016 | 8711 |
| 2017 | 8673 |
| 2018 | 8670 |
| 2019 | 8523 |
| 2021 | 8290 |

== Crime ==
Crime Data
| Year | Crime Rate (/100) |
|---|---|
| 2018 | 3.6 |
| 2019 | 3.5 |
| 2020 | 3.0 |
| 2021 | 2.3 |
| 2022 | 2.7 |
| 2023 | 2.0 |

== Education ==
The community is served by Cappy Smart Elementary School, Roland Michener Elementary, Dr. Gladys McKelvie Egbert Community public schools and by St. Martha Elementary & Junior High (Catholic).

== See also ==
- List of neighbourhoods in Calgary
