= Wayne Cao =

Canadian politician and former member of the Legislative Assembly of Alberta

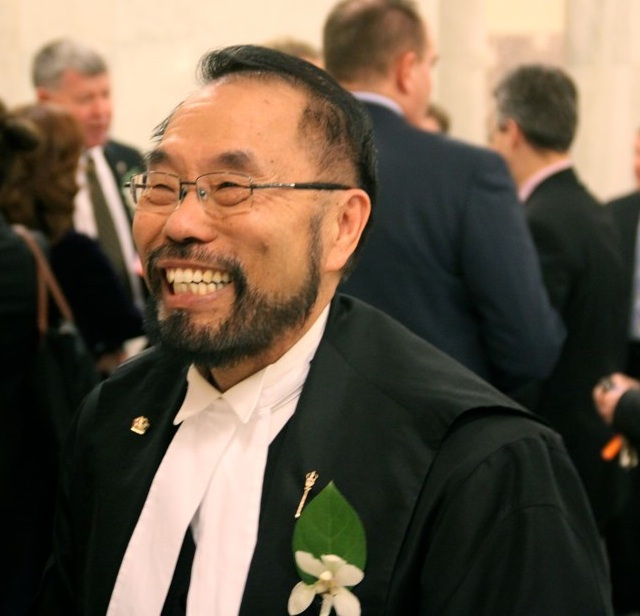
- Cao in 2011

MLA for Calgary-Fort
- In office March 11, 1997 – May 5, 2015
- Preceded by: New district
- Succeeded by: Joe Ceci

Personal details
- Born: Nguyễn Cảo; December 7, 1946 (age 79) North Vietnam
- Party: Progressive Conservative
- Spouse: Kim Hoang
- Children: three
- Education: University of Waterloo; University of Auckland
- Occupation: Information technology professional

Wayne Cao (born Nguyễn Cảo; December 7, 1946) is a Canadian politician and former member of the Legislative Assembly of Alberta, where he represented the district of Calgary-Fort as a Progressive Conservative. He was first elected in the 1997 provincial election and was re-elected four times. He is perhaps best known as the sponsor of the legislation that led to the enshrining of "Alberta". In April 2008, he elected as the Legislature's Deputy Speaker and Chair of Committees and served in that position for the 27th Legislature. Mr. Cao also served as a member of the Standing Committee on Resource Stewardship.

== Early life ==
Cao was born December 7, 1946, in northern Vietnam. He studied engineering, mathematics, and computing science in Saigon and at the University of Auckland and the University of Waterloo. After the Vietnam War, he came to California as a refugee - he boarded an American helicopter just before the fall of Saigon - and settled in Calgary in 1976. He worked for Shell Petroleum for twenty-six years before taking early retirement in 1997 to enter politics. During this time, he also lectured at the Southern Alberta Institute of Technology.

== Political career ==
Cao first sought public office in the 1997 provincial election, when he ran in the riding of Calgary-Fort as the Progressive Conservative. He was elected handily, and was re-elected in each of the next three elections. He supported Jim Dinning in the 2006 P.C. leadership race.

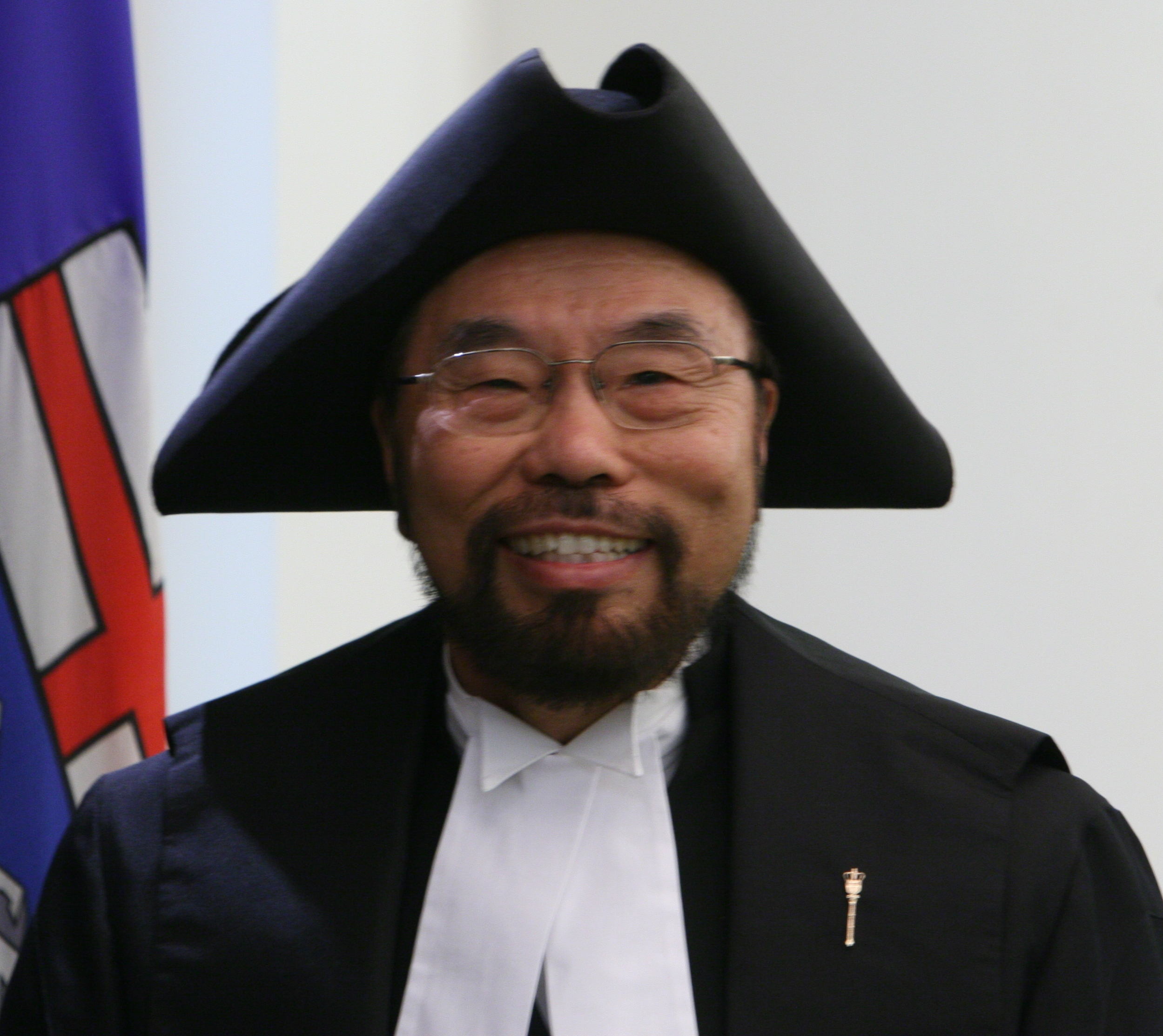
Wayne Cao elected Deputy Speaker and Chairman of Whole Assembly Committees, Legislature, Alberta, Canada, April 2008

In April 2008, he was elected by his legislator colleagues as the Deputy Speaker of the Legislative Assembly of Alberta, defeating Len Mitzel and Bridget Pastoor in a secret ballot. Cao would announce he would retire from the legislature in February 2015, prior to the 2015 Alberta general election which saw the Progressive Conservative dynasty end when the New Democratic Party would be elected to a majority government. Cao's former electoral district Calgary-Fort would elect New Democrat Joe Ceci.

=== Legislative initiatives ===
Cao has moved a large number of private member's bills. Of these, the only one to pass was 2001's Alberta Official Song Act, which established a contest for the province's official song, with the winner to be selected by an all party committee of the legislature. It passed with the support of members from all parties, although Progressive Conservative Rob Renner felt that the province's official song should be something that was already known to most Albertans rather than a new song composed for the occasion, and Liberal Hugh MacDonald argued that no official song was necessary, since Alberta already had an "unofficial song", Alberta Bound (which MacDonald recalled hearing Ian Tyson sing at the closing ceremonies of the 1988 Winter Olympics, although the song, along with Four Strong Winds, was actually sung at the opening ceremonies by Tyson and Gordon Lightfoot, the song's composer and singer). The ensuing competition selected "Alberta", composed by Mary Kieftenbeld, as the province's official song. Cao followed this bill with efforts to encourage the translation of O Canada into all languages spoken by Canadians; he composed a Vietnamese version and sang it on the Canadian Broadcasting Corporation.

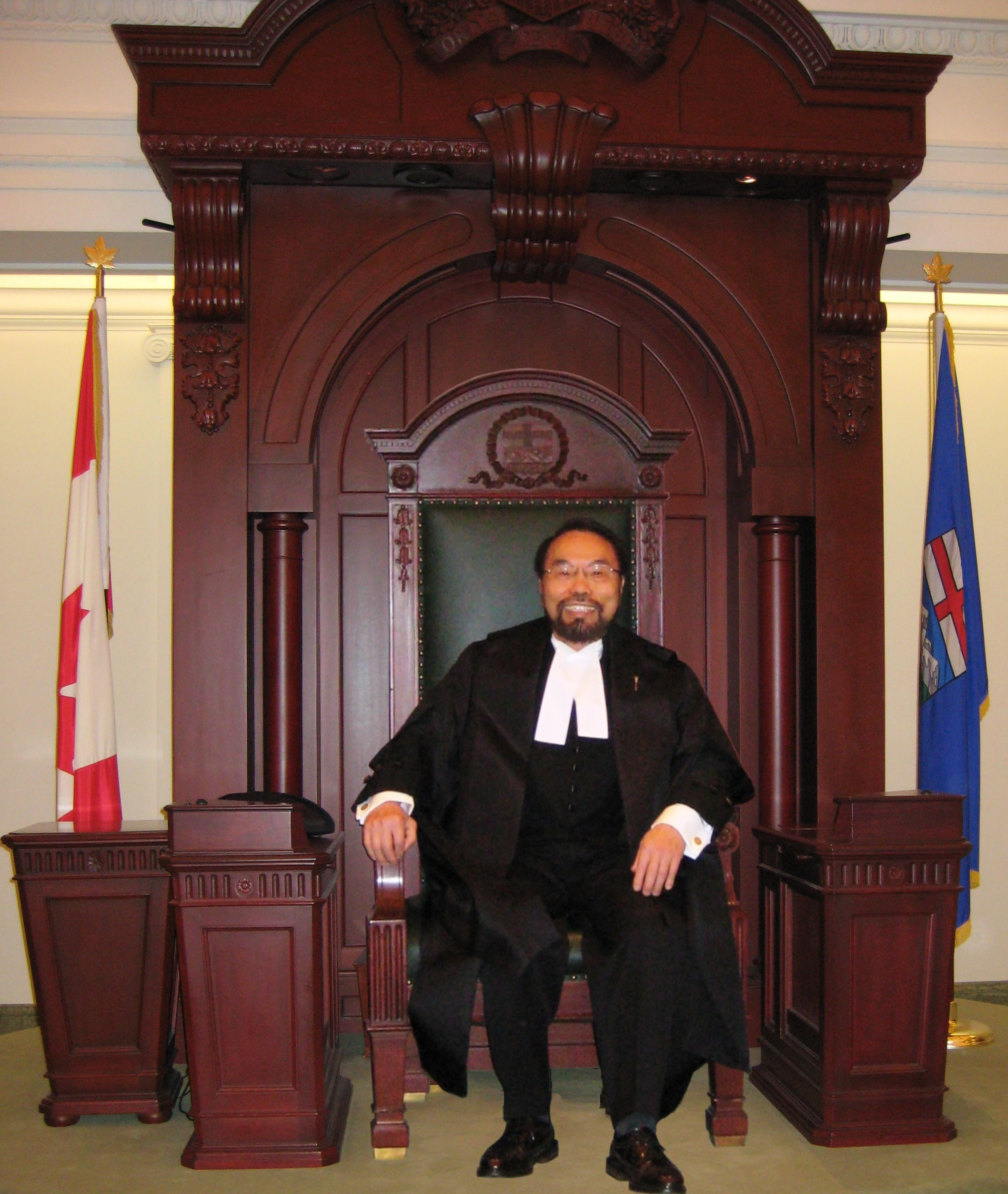
Wayne Cao, Deputy Speaker, Legislature, Alberta, Canada 2008

Cao also made headlines in 2007 with the School (Canadian History Content) Amendment Act, which would have mandated that 75% of the instructional hours in high school social studies courses be devoted to Canadian history. Several MLAs spoke in opposition to the bill, including Liberals Bill Bonko (who felt, as a former school trustee, that any percentage should be mandated by local school boards) and Harry Chase, New Democrat David Eggen (who suggested that global history was as or more important than Canadian history), and Progressive Conservative Education Minister Ron Liepert (who agreed with Eggen and who extolled the virtues of the recently implemented existing social studies curriculum). Outside of the legislature, Progressive Conservatives Neil Brown and Len Webber expressed reservations about the decision being made at the political, rather than local, level. The legislature adjourned before the bill came to a vote.

Cao also sponsored the Employment Standards (Parental Leave) Amendment Act, which would have combined the provisions for adoptive leave and maternity leave and extended them to 27 weeks (Alberta's maternity leave provisions were, at the time, the least generous in the country). He first introduced the bill in 1999, but the legislature adjourned before it reached second reading. He re-introduced it in 2000, when several MLAs, including Liberals Don Massey, Laurie Blakeman, Linda Sloan, and Percy Wickman and Progressive Conservatives Moe Amery, Karen Kryczka, and Mary Anne Jablonski, spoke in support of the bill on second reading. Only Shiraz Shariff spoke against, citing concerns that the business community hadn't been sufficiently consulted. The bill passed second reading with 34 votes in favour and four (Gary Friedel, Richard Magnus, Barry McFarland, and Rob Renner) against. However, the legislature adjourned while the bill was still in committee.

In 2008, Cao sponsored the Alberta Volunteer Service Medal Act, which would have established a medal for exceptional volunteers. It received bipartisan support from Progressive Conservatives Jonathan Denis, Carl Benito, Neil Brown, and Greg Weadick and Liberals Hugh MacDonald and Darshan Kang, but was ultimately hoisted on a motion from Progressive Conservative Fred Horne. The bill's opponents included Liberal Harry B. Chase (who felt that the government's role in volunteer recognition should come in the form of support, rather than in the form of after-the-fact recognition) and Progressive Conservatives Richard Marz (who argued that medals should be restricted to those who had risked their lives), Heather Forsyth (who was concerned by the level of bureaucracy in the bill), George Rogers (who suggested that it duplicated existing government programs), Ray Prins (who was concerned that by singling out individual volunteers it would demean the contributions of those who weren't recognized), and Doug Griffiths (who echoed Rogers' arguments and also expressed concern that the proposed award would have a built in bias in favour of volunteers with large organizations).

His other private member's bills have included 1997's Highway Traffic Amendment Act, 2002's Environmental Protection and Enhancement (Residential Land Disclosure) Amendment Act, 2003's Financial Summit Act, and 2004's Government Accountability (Identification of Expenditures) Amendment Act, none of which reached second reading.

In addition to his private member's bills, Cao has sponsored a government bill, the Tobacco Tax Amendment Act of 2003. The bill was in response to an increase in the number of Albertans buying tobacco products out of province, after the government imposed taxes on the import of tobacco products to Alberta that saw taxes on such goods more than double. It passed after little debate. Cao also sponsored a successful private bill in 1998, the Tanya Marie Bryant Adoption Termination Act.

== Personal life ==
Cao is married to Kim Hoang, an engineer and banker. The pair have three sons: William (a lawyer), Winston (an engineer), and Willis (a scientist). They also have three grandchildren: Dylan from Mimi/William, Maxwell and Chelsea from Sarah/Winston.

He identifies Confucius and Winston Churchill as his political heroes.

== Election results ==
1997 Alberta general election: Calgary-Fort
Party	Candidate	Votes	%	±%
Progressive Conservative	Wayne Cao	4,410	48.82%	–
Liberal	Shirley-Anne Reuben	2,817	31.18%	–
Social Credit	Bren Blanchet	916	10.14%	–
New Democratic	Ken Sahil	891	9.86%	–
Total		9,034	–	–
Rejected, spoiled and declined		53	–	–
Eligible electors / turnout		21,947	41.40%	–
Progressive Conservative pickup new district.				
Source(s) Source: "Calgary-Fort Official Results 1997 Alberta general election". Alberta Heritage Community Foundation. "1997 General Election". Elections Alberta.

2001 Alberta general election: Calgary-Fort
Party	Candidate	Votes	%	±%
Progressive Conservative	Wayne Cao	6,740	68.59%	19.77%
Liberal	Brian Huskins	2,004	20.39%	-10.79%
New Democratic	Vinay Dey	501	5.10%	-4.76%
Social Credit	R. Chick Hurst	160	1.63%	-8.51%
Greens	Michael Alvarez-Toye	121	1.23%	–
Independent	Metro Peter Demchynski	102	1.04%	–
Independent	Brian Slater	100	1.02%	–
Alberta First	Wyatt McIntyre	99	1.01%	–
Total		9,827	–	–
Rejected, spoiled and declined		43	–	–
Eligible electors / turnout		22,882	43.13%	1.73%
Progressive Conservative hold		Swing		15.28%
Source(s) Source: "Calgary-Fort Official Results 2001 Alberta general election". Alberta Heritage Community Foundation. "2001 Statement of Official results Calgary-Fort" (PDF). Elections Alberta.

2004 Alberta general election: Calgary-Fort
Party	Candidate	Votes	%	±%
Progressive Conservative	Wayne Cao	4,137	53.86%	-14.73%
Liberal	Gerry Hart	1,786	23.25%	2.86%
New Democratic	Elizabeth A. Thomas	584	7.60%	2.50%
Alberta Alliance	Travis P. Chase	524	6.82%	–
Greens	Tyler Charkie	439	5.72%	4.48%
Separation	Leo Ollenberger	211	2.75%	1.71%^{1}
Total		7,681	–	–
Rejected, spoiled and declined		88	–	–
Eligible electors / turnout		23,271	33.38%	-9.75%
Progressive Conservative hold		Swing		-8.79%
Source(s) Source: "Calgary-Fort Official Results 2004 Alberta general election". Alberta Heritage Community Foundation. "Calgary-Fort Statement of Official Results 2004 Alberta general election" (PDF). Elections Alberta. Note: 1. Results change compared to Alberta First Party in the 2001 general election.

2008 Alberta general election: Calgary-Fort
Party	Candidate	Votes	%	±%
Progressive Conservative	Wayne Cao	4,123	49.81%	−4.08%
Liberal	Carole Oliver	1,770	21.39%	−1.86
New Democratic	Julie Hrdlicka	1,178	14.23%	6.63%
Wildrose Alliance	Travis Chase	715	8.64%	1.82%
Green	Mark Taylor	491	5.93%	0.21%
Total		8,277		
Rejected, Spoiled and Declined		32		
Eligible electors / Turnout		28,974	28.68%	
Progressive Conservative hold		Swing		−2.97%
Source: "Calgary-Fort Statement of Official Results 2008 Alberta general election" (PDF). Elections Alberta. pp. 210–212.

2012 Alberta general election: Calgary-Fort
Party	Candidate	Votes	%	±%
Progressive Conservative	Wayne Cao	4,855	40.94%	16.03%
Wildrose	Jeevan Mangat	4,711	39.73%	35.41%
Liberal	Said Abdulbaki	1,180	9.95%	-0.74%
New Democratic	Don Monroe	796	6.71%	-0.40%
Evergreen	Janice Dixon	317	2.67%	-0.30%
Total		11,859	–	–
Rejected, spoiled and declined		110	–	–
Eligible electors / turnout		27,215	43.98%	-17.25%
Progressive Conservative hold		Swing		-6.50%
Source(s) Source: "12 - Calgary-Fort Official Results 2012 Alberta general election". officialresults.elections.ab.ca. Elections Alberta.

== See also ==
- List of University of Waterloo people
