= Mayland Heights, Calgary =

Mayland Heights
- Neighbourhood
- Location of Mayland Heights in Calgary
- Coordinates: 51°03′41″N 114°00′48″W
- Country: Canada
- Province: Alberta
- City: Calgary
- Quadrant: NE/SE
- Ward: 10
- Established: 1962
- Annexed: 1910

Government
  - Mayor: Jeromy Farkas
  - Administrative body: Calgary City Council
  - Councillor: Andre Chabot (Communities First)

Area
  - Total: 2.0 km^{2} (0.77 sq mi)
- Elevation: 1,075 m (3,527 ft)

Population (2014)
  - Total: 6,357
  - Density: 3,200/km^{2} (8,200/sq mi)
  - Median Income: $61,339
- Website: Mayland Heights Community Association

Mayland Heights is a residential neighbourhood in the northeast/southeast quadrant of Calgary, Alberta. It is bounded by Barlow Trail to the east, Memorial Drive to the south, Deerfoot Trail to the west and Trans-Canada Highway to the north.

The neighbourhood of Radisson heights is to the south, Franklin/Marlborough to the east.

The land was annexed to the City of Calgary in 1910. Originally called Crossroads, the community was established in 1962. It is represented in the Calgary City Council by the Ward 3 councillor.

== Belfast ==
The area in the Northwest corner of Mayland Heights was originally classified as its own neighborhood named Belfast. It is unknown when Belfast was annexed into Mayland Heights, but Belfast was bounded by 19 Street NE, 8 Avenue NE, 16 Avenue NE, and Deerfoot Trail.

== Demographics ==
In the City of Calgary's 2014 municipal census, Mayland Heights had a population of 6,357 living in 2,723 dwellings, a 9% increase from its 2011 population of 5,830. With a land area of 2.0 km^{2} (0.77 sq mi), it had a population density of 3,200/km^{2} (8,200/sq mi) in 2016.

Residents in this community had a median household income of $61,339 in 2011, and there were 12% low income residents living in the neighbourhood. As of 2011, 17% of the residents were immigrants. A proportion of 27% of the buildings were condominiums or apartments, and 49% of the housing was used for renting. The area can also be noted for its large Italian community.

Pop. Overtime
Year	Population
2014	6,357
2015	6,157
2016	5,919
2017	5,808
2018	5,913
2019	5,961
2021	5,925

== See also ==
- List of neighbourhoods in Calgary
