= Arthur Johnston (politician) =

Canadian politician

Member of Legislative Assembly of Alberta for Calgary-Hays
- In office November 22, 2004 – April 23, 2012
- Preceded by: New district
- Succeeded by: Ric McIver

Personal details
- Born: August 3, 1947 (age 78) Halifax, Nova Scotia, Canada
- Party: Progressive Conservative
- Spouse: Shirley
- Children: Ed, Eric, Don and Darcy
- Occupation: police officer

Arthur "Art" Johnston (born August 3, 1947) is a Canadian politician. Johnston was a Member of the Legislative Assembly of Alberta representing the constituency of Calgary-Hays as a Progressive Conservative.

== Early life ==
Johnston was born August 3, 1947, in Halifax, Nova Scotia. In 1970, he began a career with the Canadian Forces, eventually earning two United Nations service medals and NATO Service Medal. He held the rank of sergeant when he left the Forces 11 years later. In 1979 he attended the University of New Brunswick before starting a 25-year career with the Calgary Police Service (CPS). In 2003, Johnston retired from the CPS as a patrol sergeant. During his service he was awarded the 12 year Police Service Medal and the 20 year Police Exemplary Medal.

== Political career ==
Johnston first sought public office in the 2001 Calgary municipal election as alderman for Ward 12. Defeat in the aldermanic race did not deter him from later seeking election provincially in the constituency of Calgary-Hays in 2004. In that election, he was the successful candidate and received 64% of the vote.

Since his election to the Legislative Assembly of Alberta, Johnston has been involved with various committees. During his first term in office, he held the position of chair for the Social Care Facilities Review Committee, the Special Constable Review Committee, and the Alberta Heritage Savings Trust Fund Committee while also sitting as a member on a number of other committees. He also helped develop several bills including: Correction Amendment Act, 2007, Safer Communities and Neighbourhoods Act, Peace Officer Act, and Traffic Safety Amendment Act, 2007.

In the 2008 provincial election Johnston was reelected with 54% of the vote. He was chair of both the Cabinet Policy Committee on Community Services and the Social Care Facilities Review Committee, and a member of the Standing Committee on the Alberta Heritage Savings Trust Fund, the Legislative Review Committee, and the Standing Committee on Community Services.

== Personal life ==
Johnston is currently married and has four sons. In addition to reading and playing badminton, Johnston enjoys hockey, is a member of the Fish Creek Recreational Hockey League, and is a two-time gold medal recipient in the Charles Schulz hockey tournament in Santa Rosa, California. An active volunteer, he has served as director of both the Shawnessy Community Association and the Calgary-Shaw Progressive Conservative Association and volunteered for various community events. Johnston was awarded the Centennial Medal for his community contributions.

== Election results ==
2008 Alberta general election results ( Calgary-Hays )		Turnout 39.1%	
Affiliation	Candidate	Votes	%
Progressive Conservative	Arthur Johnston	6,959	54%
Liberal	Bill Kurtze	3,582	28%
Green	Bruce Keely	564	4%
NDP	Tyler Kinch	367	3%
Wildrose Alliance	Devin Cassidy	1,364	11%
2004 Alberta general election results ( Calgary-Hays )		Turnout 34.9%	
Affiliation	Candidate	Votes	%
Progressive Conservative	Arthur Johnston	5,523	63.8%
Liberal	Sharon Howe	1,926	22.2%
Alberta Alliance	Robert Wawrzynowski	534	6.2%
NDP	Rachell Wienfeld	298	3.4%
Green	Bernie Amell	378	4.4%
