= Al Duerr =

Canadian politician

Alfred Herman Duerr
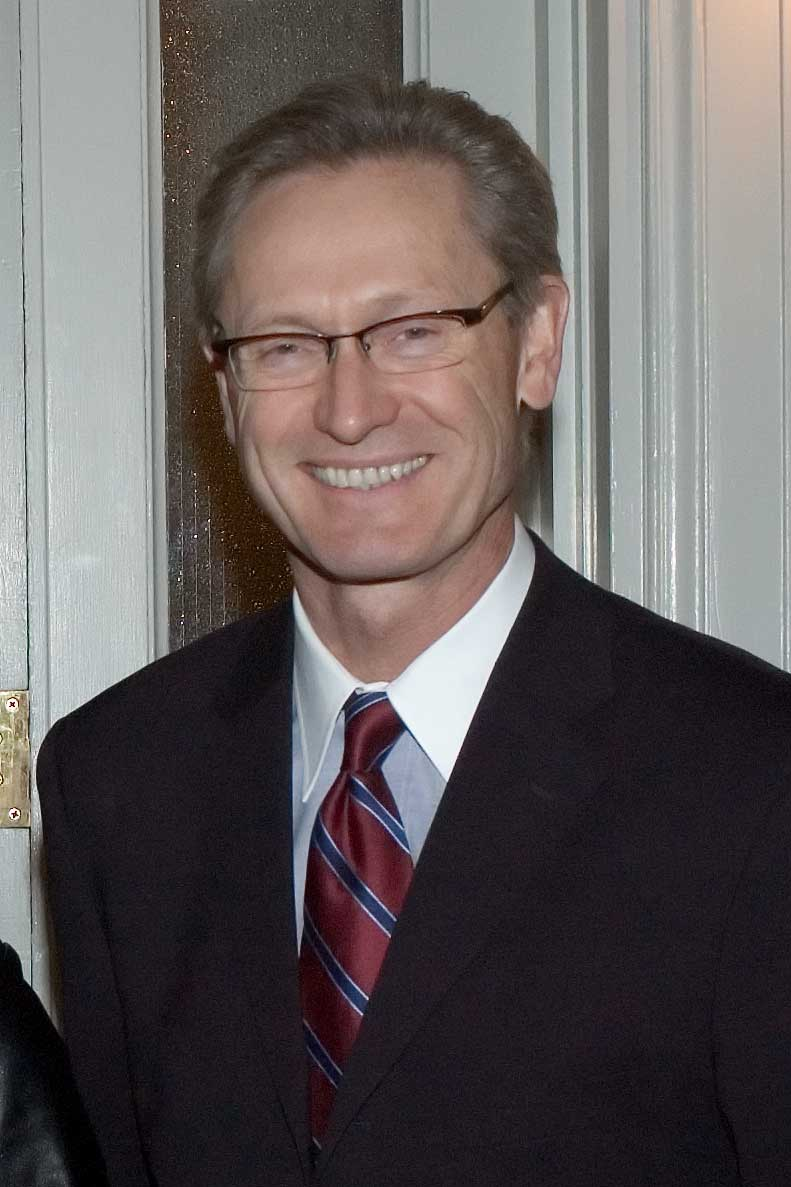

34th Mayor of Calgary
- In office October 23, 1989 – October 22, 2001
- Preceded by: Donald Adam Hartman
- Succeeded by: Dave Bronconnier

Calgary City Council Alderman
- In office October 24, 1983 – October 23, 1989

Personal details
- Born: January 29, 1951 (age 75) Humboldt, Saskatchewan, Canada
- Spouse: Kit Chan
- Education: University of Saskatchewan, University of Calgary

Alfred Herman Duerr (born January 29, 1951) is a former Canadian politician who served as the 34th mayor of Calgary, Alberta from 1989 to 2001, and a city alderman from 1983 to 1989.

== Early life and education ==
Duerr was born January 29, 1951, in Humboldt, Saskatchewan, the fourth of six children. He attended Humboldt Collegiate.

Duerr graduated from the University of Saskatchewan with a degree in regional and urban development in 1973. He holds a Master of Business Administration degree from the University of Calgary.

== Political career ==
Duerr was first elected as an alderman for Ward 9 on Calgary City Council in 1983 and was re-elected in 1986. Incumbent Mayor Ralph Klein resigned in the months before the 1989 municipal election to pursue provincial office and Duerr contested and won the mayor's seat in the 1989 election. Duerr would go on to be re-elected as mayor three more times in 1992, 1995, and 1998 before deciding not to contest the 2001 election, which was won by former Alderman Dave Bronconnier.

Duerr's time as mayor coincided with significant spending cuts by the federal government and austerity policies by Ralph Klein's provincial government. Provincial austerity would result in a significant reduction in grant funding for municipalities which in turn resulted in lower capital spending and public construction projects in Calgary.

In 1991, Duerr would proclaim gay pride week in Calgary; however, he would deny future proclamations due to public pressure.

During his four terms, Duerr was considered one of the most popular mayors in the city's history. His conciliatory, managerial style and likeable personality made him well respected. Duerr was given the nickname of "Mr. Beige" by local media columnists, and in the 1998 election would be challenged by local political columnist Rick Bell, although Bell's candidacy was not a serious attempt to contest the mayor's office.

In 1997 while serving as mayor, Duerr played the character of Mayor Wilkins in an episode of the television show Viper.

== Later life ==
He is the Chief Executive Officer of Emergo Projects International, and serves on the board of directors for two other companies in Calgary. He is a member of the Community and Partners Advisory Committee of the Libin Cardiovascular Institute of Alberta.

In 2014, Duerr was appointed Chair of the independent Calgary Ward Boundary Commission to examine the boundaries of Calgary City Council wards in time for the 2017 Calgary municipal election. The Commission recommended against increasing the number of councillors for the City and instead recommended creating satellite offices for larger constituencies and increasing the budget of the councillor's office.

== Personal life ==
Duerr is married to Kit Chan and has two children.

Preceded by Donald Adam Hartman	Mayor of Calgary; 1989–2001	Succeeded by Dave Bronconnier
