= Vista Heights, Calgary =

Vista Heights
- Neighbourhood
- Location of Vista Heights in Calgary
- Coordinates: 51°04′16″N 114°00′48″W
- Country: Canada
- Province: Alberta
- City: Calgary
- Quadrant: NE
- Ward: 5
- Established: 1962

Government
  - Mayor: Jeromy Farkas
  - Administrative body: Calgary City Council
  - Councillor: Raj Dhaliwal (Independent)

Area
  - Total: 1.0 km^{2} (0.39 sq mi)
- Elevation: 1,090 m (3,580 ft)

Population (2006)
  - Total: 2,190
  - Average Income: $51,370
- Website: Vista Heights Community Association

Vista Heights is a residential neighbourhood in the northeast quadrant of Calgary, Alberta. It is bounded to the south by the Trans-Canada Highway and to the west by Deerfoot Trail. To the north and east it borders the South Airways Industrial Area.

Vista Heights was established in 1962. It is represented in the Calgary City Council by the Ward 5 councillor.

== Demographics ==
In the City of Calgary's 2012 municipal census, Vista Heights had a population of 2,204 living in 844 dwellings, a -3.1% increase from its 2011 population of 2,274. With a land area of 1.1 km^{2} (0.42 sq mi), it had a population density of 2,000/km^{2} (5,190/sq mi) in 2012.

Residents in this community had a median household income of $51,370 in 2000, and there were 25.4% low income residents living in the neighbourhood. As of 2000, 18.6% of the residents were immigrants. Most buildings were single-family detached homes and row houses, and 47% of the housing was used for renting.

Pop. Overtime
Year	Population
2014	2336
2015	2444
2016	2286
2017	2302
2018	2321
2019	2370
2021	2300

== Education ==
The community is served by the Vista Heights Elementary public school.

== See also ==
- List of neighbourhoods in Calgary
