= Abbeydale, Calgary =

Abbeydale
- Neighbourhood
- Location of Abbeydale in Calgary
- Coordinates: 51°03′39″N 113°55′40″W
- Country: Canada
- Province: Alberta
- City: Calgary
- Quadrant: NE
- Ward: 10
- Established: 1976
- Annexed: 1976

Government
  - Mayor: Jeromy Farkas
  - Administrative body: Calgary City Council
  - Councillor: Andre Chabot (Communities First)

Area
  - Total: 2.0 km^{2} (0.77 sq mi)
- Elevation: 1,067 m (3,501 ft)

Population (2015)
  - Total: 6,012
  - Average Income: $81,232
- Website: Profile

Abbeydale is a neighbourhood in the northeast quadrant of Calgary, Alberta. It is bordered to the north by Trans-Canada Highway, to the east by Stoney Trail, to the south by Canadian National Railway tracks and to the west by 68 Street E.

Abbeydale was annexed by the City of Calgary in 1976.

== Demographics ==
In the City of Calgary's 2016 municipal census, Abbeydale had a population of 6,150 living in 2,015 dwellings, a 7.9% increase from its 2011 population of 5,700. With a land area of 1.7 km^{2} (0.66 sq mi), it had a population density of 2,130/km^{2} in 2012.

Residents in this community had a median household income of $81,232 in 2015, and there were 21% low income residents living in the neighbourhood. As of 2016, 31% of the residents were immigrants. A proportion of 1% of the buildings were condominiums or apartments, and 26% were used for renting.

Pop. Overtime
| Year | Population |
|---|---|
| 2014 | 6071 |
| 2015 | 6167 |
| 2016 | 5912 |
| 2017 | 6043 |
| 2018 | 5986 |
| 2019 | 5957 |
| 2021 | 5925 |

== Education ==
The community is served by Abbeydale Elementary public school and also by St. Kateri Tekakwitha Elementary School (catholic).

== See also ==
- List of neighbourhoods in Calgary
