= Dave Bronconnier =

Canadian politician

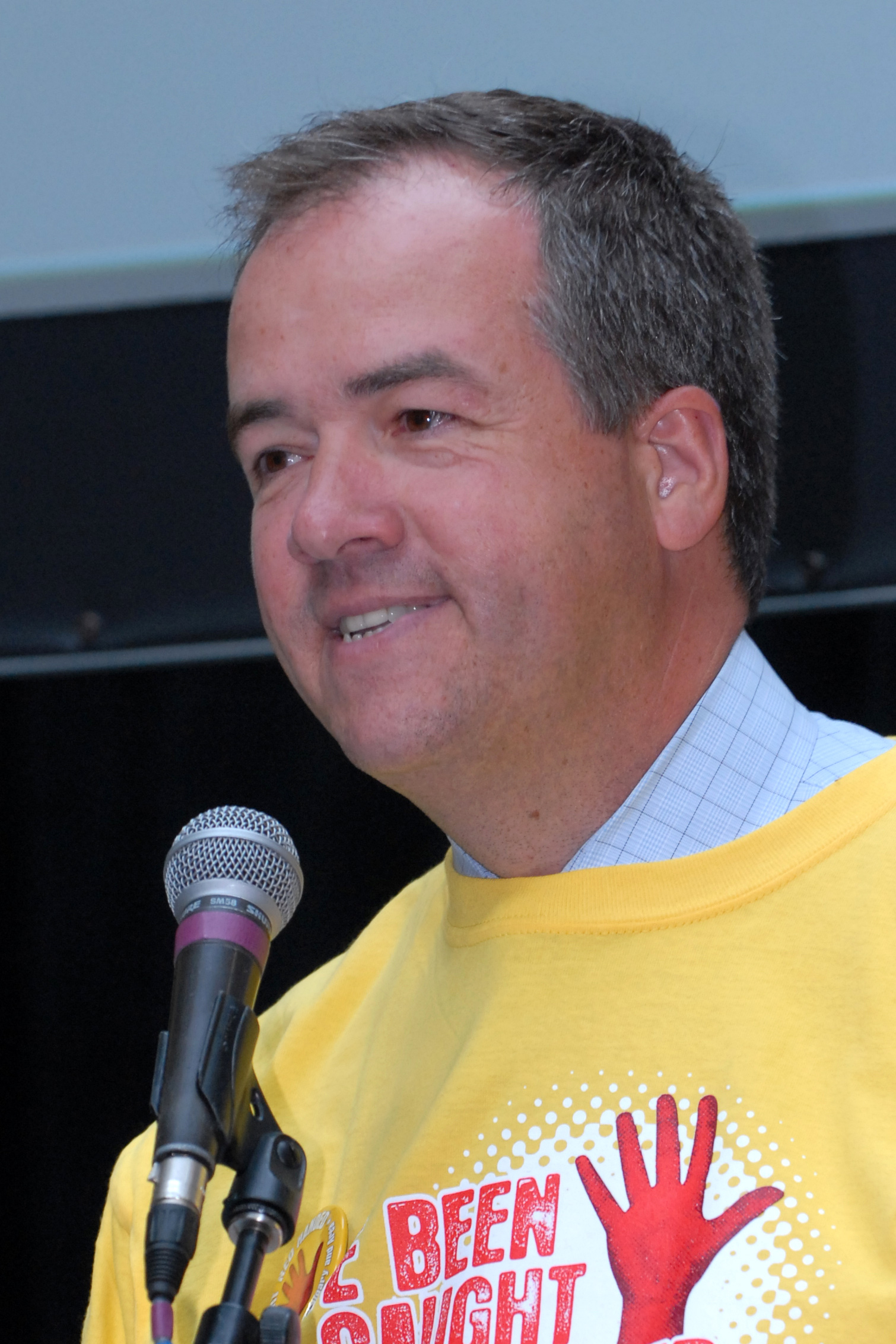

35th Mayor of Calgary
- In office October 22, 2001 – October 25, 2010
- Preceded by: Al Duerr
- Succeeded by: Naheed Nenshi

Personal details
- Born: October 7, 1962 (age 63) Calgary, Alberta
- Spouse: Cindy Bronconnier

David Thomas Bronconnier (born October 7, 1962) is a Canadian politician who served as the 35th mayor of Calgary, Alberta.

== Personal life ==
A fourth-generation Calgarian (his great grandmother was born in Calgary in 1895), he grew up in the southwest community of Glenbrook and attended Viscount Bennett High School. Bronconnier enrolled at the University of Calgary but left after a short while to pursue work opportunities. He worked for the City of Calgary Electric System and for Alberta Government Telephones and then in 1983, started a small construction company. In 1987, Bronconnier and his business partner founded First General Services, a company which specializes in various types of insurance restoration in buildings. The firm has grown substantially since then. Dave is married to Cindy Bronconnier, with whom he has four children; Adam, Weston, Leslie and Grant.

== Political career ==
Bronconnier served on Calgary's city council as the alderman for Ward 6 for nine years. He was first elected in 1992 and then served 3 terms before deciding to run for mayor. In 1997, Bronconnier ran in the federal election as the Liberal candidate for Calgary West. Bronconnier was defeated by a landslide in this election by Reform Party candidate Rob Anders. Long serving and very popular mayor Al Duerr was retiring leaving the position open. Bronconnier narrowly defeated Bev Longstaff, Duerr's protégé, winning the mayoralty race of 2001. He became Calgary's 35th mayor.

Bronconnier was re-elected in 2004 with nearly 80% of the votes. Only 18% of the population voted, making it the lowest voter turnout for a municipal election in Western Canada. He campaigned for re-election in the 2007 Calgary municipal election and was re-elected with 61% of the votes.

On February 23, 2010, Bronconnier announced that he would not seek reelection in the 2010 municipal election. He was among the finalists for the 2010 World Mayor prize.

In November 2011, Bronconnier was named by Premier Alison Redford to be Alberta's trade commissioner in Washington, D.C. for a nine-month term.

== Mayoralty ==
=== Environmental leadership ===
Mounting international, domestic, and celebrity criticism of Alberta's underdeveloped green technology infrastructure prompted former Premier Ed Stelmach's government to commit 4 billion CAD to a province-wide green capital projects plan in 2009.

In 2009 Bronconnier and Pembina Institute was awarded at the "UN Climate Change Summit" with the 'Reaching Out to Global Energy Award' for the technical and engineering collaboration with Calgary's 'Greening the Grid program'. city consulted with Pembina for technical advice. Pembina scholars compiled the Options for Reducing GHG Emissions in Calgary to advise the city on how to implement infrastructure projects for environmental protection. The city acted on these recommendations through city-owned company Enmax decided on a series of public works facilities such as the 'Shepard Energy Center', and a 12-turbine wind farm that supplies wind power for Calgary Transit's C-trains, and the District Energy Centre, a heat capture energy plant providing heat and energy for the downtown core. The city publication of the 'Greening the Grid' was entitled 'Calgary Climate Change Action Plan: Target (down arrow) 50' (Target Minus 50)

The 'Greening the Grid' program's objectives are to empower city facilities by renewable sources by 2012. Calgary Transit's C-trains' electrical needs were partially provided by wind power in 2001, by 2009 the inception year of 'Greening the Grid', the C-train were fully empowered by 'Ride the Wind' a program launched by Enmax and wind power engineers 'Vision Quest Windlectric. committed 250 million CAD on the 'Greening the grid' program.
