= Belvedere, Calgary =

Belvedere
- Neighbourhood
- Location of Belvedere in Calgary
- Coordinates: 51.03773°N 113.90475°W
- Country: Canada
- Province: Alberta
- City: Calgary
- Quadrant: SE

Government
  - Mayor: Jeromy Farkas
  - Administrative body: Calgary City Council

Belvedere is a residential neighbourhood that is currently under development in the southeast quadrant of Calgary, Alberta. It is bounded by the East Hills shopping centre and 84 Street SE to the west, Huxley to the north, and 17 Avenue SE to the south.

== History ==
The land where Belvedere stands on was annexed by Calgary in 2007, and the community was approved by Calgary City Council on April 8, 2013.

Development of the community began in September 2020, after the development of the East Hills Shopping Centre in 2013.

== See also ==
- List of neighbourhoods in Calgary
