= Hub Oil explosion =

1999 industrial accident in Calgary

Coordinates: 51.0370°N 113.9483°W

The Hub Oil explosion was an industrial explosion that occurred on August 9, 1999, in Calgary, Alberta, resulting in two fatalities. The Hub Oil refinery was situated at 5805 17 Avenue SE, near the eastern edge of Calgary and just south of the residential community of Penbrooke.

== Historical background ==
The Kalmacoff family traces its roots to Kamsack, Saskatchewan, where Jake Kalmacoff Sr. established a conventional crude oil refinery in the 1930s. During World War II, this refinery also re-refined used lube oil for the Air Force and was designated as essential to the war effort. In 1958, his son, Jake Kalmacoff Jr., relocated to Calgary with his family and acquired the dormant Monarch Refinery in what was then the Village of Hubalta, Alberta. The refinery, built in 1939, had operated for only two years before being shut down. Jake Jr. applied the re-refining technology the family had developed during the war and renamed the business Hub Oil Company Ltd.

Building on its past experience, the company focused on collecting and recycling used lubricating oil from industrial and commercial businesses. In the 1990s, it expanded its operations to include the collection and recycling of used oil filters, plastic oil containers, and antifreeze. At its peak, the facility processed and recycled 15 million liters (3,300,000 imp gal; 4,000,000 US gal) of used oil annually.

== Products ==
The facility's end product was a base mineral oil that, when combined with additives, could be compounded and blended into various products, including automotive engine oil, transmission fluid, gear oil, and other industrial lubricants. Much of the industrial oil was sold to potash mines in Saskatchewan. Because the oil was considered food-grade, potash companies could use it as an anti-clumping and dust-suppressing spray suitable for potash that would eventually become fertilizer for the food industry. The metal from oil filters was repurposed to make rebar for the construction industry, the plastic was recycled into various materials, and the antifreeze was cleaned and processed into reusable antifreeze.

== Fire ==
The fire raged out of control for more than nine hours after the initial explosion, fuelled by oil, jet fuel, and propane. Two additional major explosions occurred shortly after the first.

C.S. Martin was asleep at a nearby house on Penworth Place when the first explosion occurred, a moment he remembers vividly.

"Since I was three years old, I grew up in Penbrooke and at one point, I lived on Penrith Crescent less than a kilometre from the blast site. The people in the community always talked about the smells coming from Hub Oil. Many people suffered from frequent headaches, and symptoms not unlike those from the community of Lynwood Ridge.

The morning of the blast, I was in bed, and was wakened by the sound of thunder. I looked out my bedroom window, and the sky was blue, but I thought nothing of it. Moments later, my mother banged on the door and told me to wake up, as she thought Hub Oil had exploded; as she always thought it would.

We drove to a pedestrian bridge over train tracks close to a mobile home park close to the blast, and from that vantage point about 35 feet above the horizon, we could see the damage and feel the intense heat from the flames. Later, a very large radius including this bridge, and up to 100 feet from my home were evacuated. My family decided to head south to my aunt and uncle's house on Riverside Crescent which I later bought from them in 2011.

Safely evacuated, all we could do was watch on the news to see if any more tanks had ruptured and wiped out the community. The fire burned out, and we returned home to find fallout for weeks to come. That day faded into nothing more than a memory."

All three explosions were loud enough to be clearly heard from the opposite side of Calgary. Many residents in communities near the site initially dismissed the first blast and the resulting plume of smoke as a fire training exercise, given that the Calgary Fire Department operates a training facility about 600 yards (550 m) south of the site.

Approximately 300 nearby residents were evacuated for 20 hours. When they returned, they found their homes covered in globs of oil, fine dust, and shrapnel from exploded refinery vessels. The Calgary Fire Department lost two truck units in the second explosion, and several firefighters sustained minor injuries. Additionally, a Calgary Police Service car was destroyed in the third major blast.

In total, three major explosions and over a dozen minor ones occurred, significantly hindering efforts to control the fire. Since no major structures were under immediate threat and there was no significant fuel source to spread the fire further, the Calgary Fire Department decided to withdraw to a safe distance, allowing the fire to burn itself down considerably before making another attempt to extinguish it.

Also destroyed in the fire was the Corral Four Drive-In, a four-screen drive-in theatre that was closed at the time of the accident. The remaining parts of the drive-in were removed in 2001.

The two fatalities in the accident were refinery workers Ryan Silver, 24, and Ryan Eckhard, 26. Both men lost their lives when the small brick building they were in was completely destroyed by the initial explosion.

An investigation determined that a pressure buildup in a second-hand storage tank caused the massive fireball. During the trial, it was revealed that the tank had been sold as scrap 28 years earlier.

The vessel, measuring over two meters (6 ft 7 in) in diameter and nine meters in length, was fabricated in 1963 and decommissioned in 1971. Hub Oil purchased it in 1985, but the tank remained unused for another six years until the company transitioned its fuel recycling operation from a one-step to a two-step recovery system.

== Trial ==
Hub Oil eventually pleaded guilty to the following charges:

- Three counts of common nuisance
- Endangering the public

The company was commended by the court for identifying the cause of the fire, pleading guilty to the charge of common nuisance, and refusing to lay blame on its employees. The company paid a fine of $200,000, voluntarily endowed two bursaries totaling $100,000 to SAIT's Workplace Safety program, and established a $100,000 trust fund for the children of the two men who died in the fire.

== Site remediation ==
Following the fire, Hub Oil continued operations on a reduced basis (collection, storage, and dispatching) until 2001, when the company voluntarily shut down with the intention of promoting urban renewal. The site was cleared of all unusable structures and damaged oil tanks. Extensive soil, groundwater, and soil vapor testing was immediately initiated by WorleyParsons Komex and continues to this day. In 2003, a groundwater treatment system was voluntarily installed to prevent the potential offsite migration of contaminants. At no point has the company been under a directive from Alberta Environment due to non-compliance with the Environmental Enhancement and Protection Act.

In June 2007, when questioned in the legislature, Minister of the Environment Rob Renner stated, "Hub Oil is working with Alberta Environment, with the various stakeholders... As long as they continue to own that land, and as long as they put in place the necessary provisions to ensure that any contamination does not go beyond the land in question, they’re not in contravention of our legislation."

During this time, numerous public meetings were held to keep the community updated on Hub Oil's remediation plans. From these meetings, a permanent Stakeholder Group was established, composed of community members, regulatory agencies, and elected officials, to ensure that the reclamation plan was both acceptable and complete.

In April 2008, Alberta Environment approved Hub Oil's "Remediation and Reclamation" plan. The plan includes the currently operating water containment system, a proposed 1.2 metres (3 ft 11 in) clay cap over the site, and extensive groundwater and soil vapor monitoring, testing, and reporting for the next ten years. The plan also calls for continued reporting to stakeholders as the company proceeds with the development of the site to ensure they are kept informed.

== Site redevelopment ==
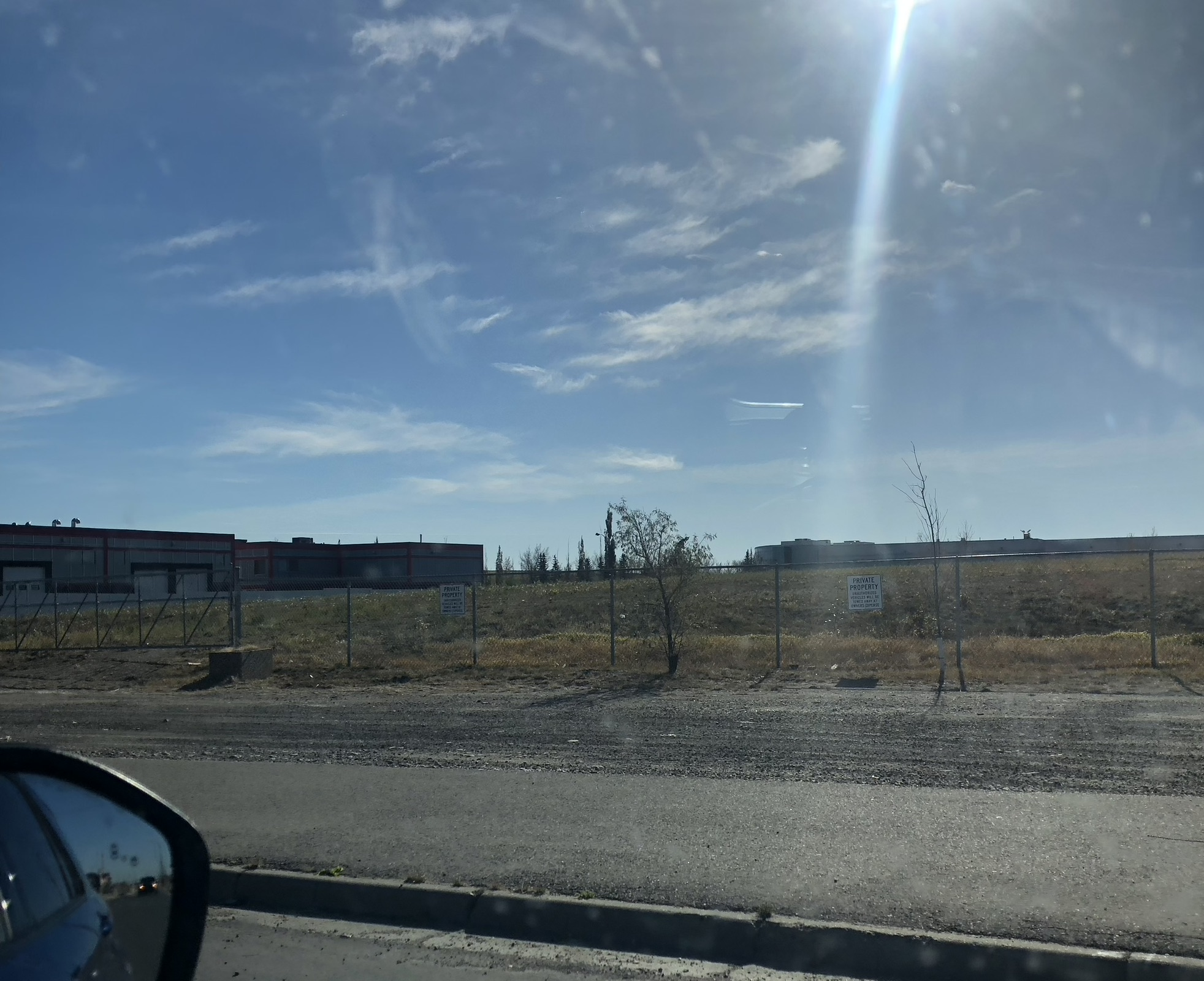
site of the Hub Oil explosion as seen in October 2025

Hub Oil is committed to redeveloping the site for its highest and best use. One development being considered is a technology incubation center, as proposed in the report commissioned by the Government of Alberta titled "Task Force on Value-added and Technology Commercialization." The report recommended the creation of new product commercialization centers. These facilities and services would assist Alberta's start-up and growth-oriented firms in developing new products and services. Examples of focus sectors include green technology, life sciences, advanced materials, nanotechnology, and geomatics.

== See also ==
- List of explosions
