= Ric McIver =

Canadian politician (born 1958)

The Honourable Ric McIver ECA MLA
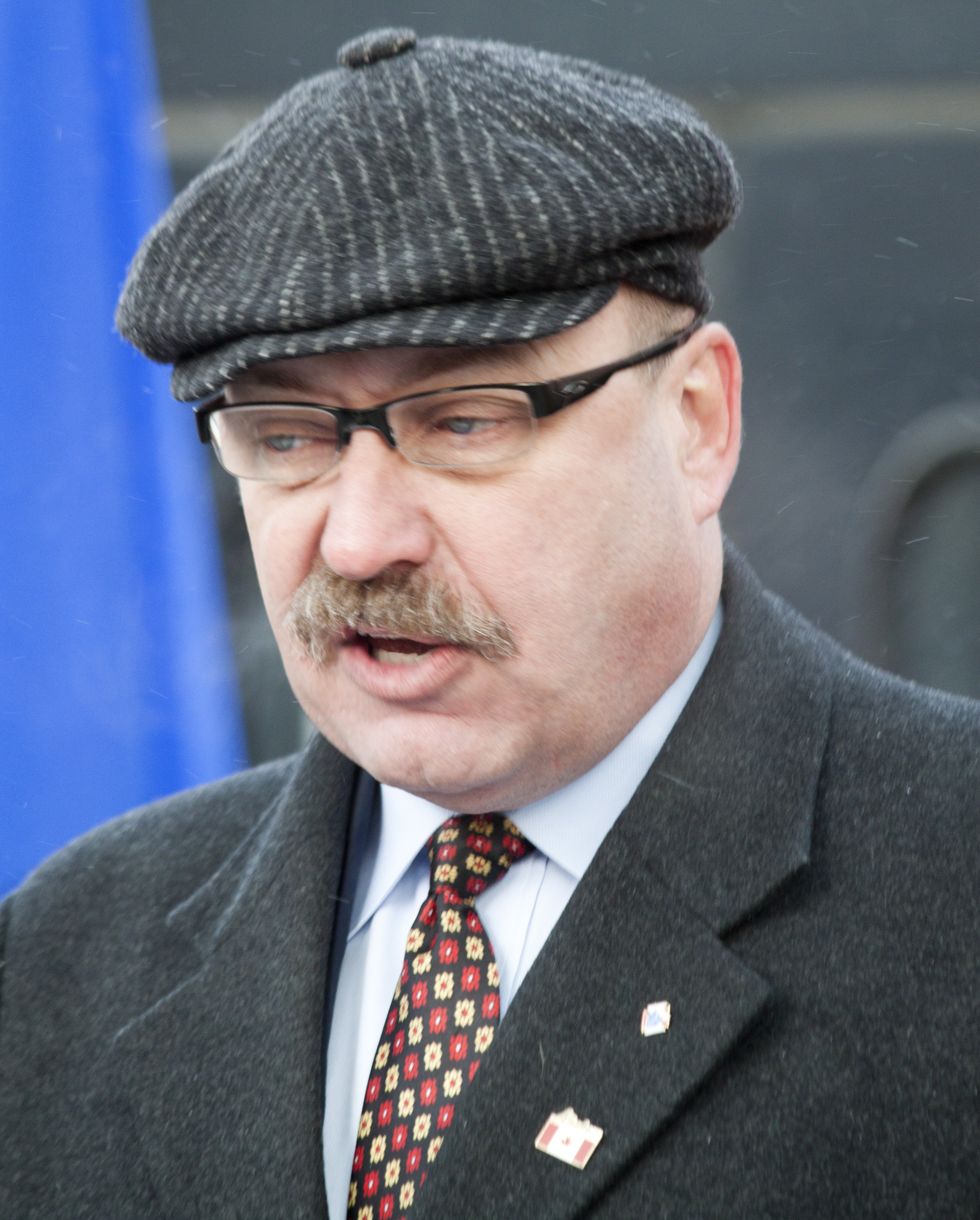
- McIver in 2012

15th Speaker of the Legislative Assembly of Alberta
- Incumbent
- Assumed office May 13, 2025
- Preceded by: Nathan Cooper

Interim Leader of the Progressive Conservative Association of Alberta
- In office May 11, 2015 – March 18, 2017
- Preceded by: Jim Prentice
- Succeeded by: Jason Kenney
Alberta Executive Council
Minister of Municipal Affairs
In office June 9, 2023 – May 13, 2025
Premier	Danielle Smith
Preceded by	Rebecca Schulz
Succeeded by	Joseph Schow (interim)
In office July 8, 2021 – October 21, 2022
Premier	Jason Kenney; Danielle Smith
Preceded by	Tracy Allard
Succeeded by	Rebecca Schulz
In office May 8, 2012 – December 6, 2013
Premier	Alison Redford
Preceded by	Ray Danyluk
Succeeded by	Wayne Drysdale
Minister of Transportation
In office April 30, 2019 – July 8, 2021
Premier	Jason Kenney
Preceded by	Brian Mason
Succeeded by	Rajan Sawhney
In office May 8, 2012 – May 6, 2014
Premier	Alison Redford; Dave Hancock
Preceded by	Ray Danyluk
Succeeded by	Wayne Drysdale
Minister of Jobs, Skills, Training and Labour
In office September 15, 2014 – May 24, 2015
Premier	Jim Prentice
Preceded by	Thomas Lukaszuk
Succeeded by	Lori Sigurdson
Minister of Infrastructure
In office December 13, 2013 – May 6, 2014
Premier	Alison Redford; Dave Hancock
Preceded by	Wayne Drysdale
Succeeded by	Wayne Drysdale
Parliamentary constituencies
Member of the Legislative Assembly of Alberta for Calgary-Hays
Incumbent
Assumed office April 23, 2012
Preceded by	Art Johnston
Member of the Calgary City Council for Ward 12
In office October 15, 2001 – October 18, 2010
Preceded by	Sue Higgins
Succeeded by	Shane Keating

Personal details
- Born: Richard William McIver; August 28, 1958 (age 68) Woodstock, Ontario, Canada
- Party: United Conservative
- Spouse: Christine McIver
- Children: 4
- Occupation: Politician

Richard William McIver ECA MLA (born August 28, 1958) is a Canadian politician who has represented Calgary-Hays in the Legislative Assembly of Alberta since 2012. A member of the United Conservative Party (UCP), McIver is the current Speaker of the Legislative Assembly of Alberta since May 2025, stepping down from his role as minister of municipal affairs to do so.

He entered politics in 2001 when he was elected to the Calgary City Council, serving until 2010. In 2012, he joined the Progressive Conservatives (PCs) and was elected as a member of the Legislative Assembly (MLA). McIver was a cabinet minister from 2013 until the PCs were defeated in the 2015 provincial election. He served as interim PC leader from 2015 to 2017, and returned to cabinet when the new UCP formed government in 2019.

== Political career ==
=== Municipal politics ===
McIver first ran for the position of Ward 12 Alderman in 1998 against long time incumbent Sue Higgins. McIver came second but lost by a huge margin with Higgins receiving 15,000 votes and McIver with just under 3,000 votes. During that term McIver ran in a by-election for Ward 14 again placing second of twelve candidates losing to Diane Colley-Urquhart by 288 votes. After Sue Higgins announced she would not run again in Ward 12, McIver ran there again, this time successfully in 2001. He began his first term as Ward 12 Alderman in October 2001. He was acclaimed to a second term in 2004. In the 2007 election, he again faced opposition at the ballot box but was re-elected with a 91% majority.

McIver held his post on Calgary City Council from his election in October 2001 until his run for mayor in October 2010. On April 21, 2010, he announced his intentions to run for mayor in the October 2010 municipal election.

He came in second in the mayoral election, garnering over 112,000 votes.

During his time on city council, McIver served on the following civic boards and committees:

- Calgary Housing Company, Chair for three years
- Standing Policy Committee on Community and Protective Services, Chair
- Standing Policy Committee on Finance and Corporate Services
- Land and Asset Strategy Committee
- Family and Community Support Services, Chair
- Provincial Justice Policy Advisory Committee
- Audit Committee
- Emergency Management Committee, Chair
- Aldermanic Office Coordinating Committee
- Calgary Police Commission
- Alberta Urban Municipalities Association, Vice President

=== Provincial politics ===
In December 2011, McIver ran at the provincial level challenging MLA Art Johnston for the Progressive Conservative Association of Alberta (PC) nomination in the Calgary-Hays constituency, a riding including many neighbourhoods of his former ward 12. McIver defeated the incumbent by a margin of 285 votes, taking the election 406–121. On April 23, 2012, in the provincial election, McIver was elected into the Legislative Assembly of Alberta, receiving 8,614 votes out of 15,642 (55.07%) to become just the second representative for the Calgary-Hays district since its creation. McIver was sworn in on May 8, 2012.

In addition to his duties as MLA, McIver subsequently held the following roles in government:

- Alberta's Minister of Transportation. (McIver was the first Minister of Transportation for Alberta to be selected from one of its major cities)
- Government of Alberta's Treasury Board Committee.
- Government's Operations and Policy Cabinet Committee.
- Minister of Infrastructure. (assigned after a cabinet shuffle in December 2013)

=== Progressive Conservative leadership run ===
McIver resigned from cabinet in May 2014 in order to stand in the PC leadership election, following the resignation of Premier Alison Redford. During the leadership campaign, he attended the March for Jesus. He later made it clear he did not share in the group's anti-gay beliefs after media attention to the event. McIver placed second with 11.7% of the vote, losing to Jim Prentice. On September 15, 2014, McIver was appointed Minister of Jobs, Skills, Training and Labour in Prentice's cabinet.

=== Progressive Conservative interim leader ===
On May 11, 2015, following the party's defeat in the 2015 provincial election the previous week and the resulting resignation of party leader Jim Prentice, McIver was chosen by caucus to be interim leader of the PC Party. At the time, he did not rule out running for permanent leader at the leadership election to be held in 2017.

On April 18, 2016, McIver was thrown out of the Alberta legislature by Speaker Bob Wanner for repeatedly refusing to sit down despite the speaker's requests after learning that sheets explaining the speaker's ruling for an NDP amendment on a motion tabled by McIver had been distributed before the amendment was debated on the floor.

McIver announced on November 8, 2016, that he would not be running for the permanent leadership and would remain interim leader until the March convention.

=== United Conservative Party ===
In 2017, McIver joined the UCP, along with most of the PC caucus, when the party merged with Wildrose.

At the party's founding convention in May 2018, McIver passionately argued against a proposed policy that would allow schools to inform parents if their child joins a gay-straight alliance. Addressing party delegates, he stated that “You may disagree with some people in the room with people being gay, but they are gay. They need to be safe. We cannot out kids that are in a club (designed) to protect themselves.” McIver further argued "Don't be called the Lake of Fire Party. I am begging you." Despite these pleas, the policy passed with 57% support.

On May 13, 2025, McIver stepped down as Minister of Municipal Affairs after being elected as Speaker of the Legislative Assembly of Alberta to replace Nathan Cooper, who took up a role representing Alberta in Washington D.C.

=== Recall Petition ===
A recall petition against McIver was approved by Elections Alberta on November 14, 2025. Signature collection runs from November 25, 2025 to February 22, 2026, requiring 12,820 signatures.

== Electoral record ==
2023 Alberta general election: Calgary-Hays
Party	Candidate	Votes	%	±%
United Conservative	Ric McIver	11,807	55.61	-7.59
New Democratic	Andrew Stewart	8,987	42.33	+16.91
Green	Evelyn Tanaka	321	1.51	–
Solidarity Movement	Garry Leonhardt	118	0.56	–
Total		21,233	99.38	–
Rejected and declined		133	0.62	
Turnout		21,366	60.45	
Eligible voters		35,345		
United Conservative hold		Swing		-12.25
Source(s) Source: Elections Alberta

2019 Alberta general election: Calgary-Hays
Party	Candidate	Votes	%	±%	Expenditures
United Conservative	Ric McIver	14,186	63.19%	-1.23%	$56,063
New Democratic	Tory Tomblin	5,706	25.42%	-4.05%	$48,441
Alberta Party	Chris Nowell	2,052	9.14%	–	$4,184
Liberal	Frances Woytkiw	293	1.31%	-2.84%	$500
Alberta Independence	Kenneth Morrice	211	0.94%	–	$1,209
Total		22,448	–	–	
Rejected, spoiled and declined		129	53	6	
Eligible electors / turnout		34,230	65.97%	12.70%	
United Conservative hold		Swing			
Source(s) Source: Elections Alberta Note: Expenses is the sum of "Election Expenses", "Other Expenses" and "Transfers Issued". The Elections Act limits "Election Expenses" to $50,000.

2015 Alberta general election: Calgary-Hays
Party	Candidate	Votes	%	±%
Progressive Conservative	Ric McIver	6,671	38.26%	-16.83%
New Democratic	Carla Drader	5,138	29.47%	26.52%
Wildrose	Bob Mailloux	4,562	26.16%	-10.07%
Liberal	Shawn Emran	722	4.14%	-1.60%
Green	Graham Mackenzie	250	1.43%	–
Social Credit	Zachary Doyle	93	0.53%	–
Total		17,436	–	–
Rejected, spoiled and declined		28	29	6
Eligible electors / turnout		32,793	53.27%	-1.64%
Progressive Conservative hold		Swing		-5.03%
Source(s) Source: "16 - Calgary-Hays, 2015 Alberta general election". officialresults.elections.ab.ca. Elections Alberta. Chief Electoral Officer (2016). 2015 General Election. A Report of the Chief Electoral Officer (PDF) (Report). Edmonton, Alta.: Elections Alberta.

2012 Alberta general election: Calgary-Hays
Party	Candidate	Votes	%	±%
Progressive Conservative	Ric McIver	8,621	55.09	+0.86
Wildrose	Wayne Anderson	5,670	36.23	+25.60
Liberal	Brian MacPhee	898	5.74	-22.17
New Democratic	Regina Vergara	461	2.95	+0.10
Total		15,650		
Rejected, spoiled and declined				
Eligible electors / Turnout			%	
Progressive Conservative hold		Swing		-12.37

Alberta provincial government of Jason Kenney
Cabinet post (1)
Predecessor	Office	Successor
Brian Mason	Minister of Transportation; April 30, 2019–July 8, 2021	Rajan Sawhney
Alberta provincial government of Jim Prentice
Cabinet post (1)
Predecessor	Office	Successor
Thomas Lukaszuk	Minister of Jobs, Skills, Training and Labour; September 15, 2014–May 23, 2015	Lori Sigurdson
Alberta provincial government of Dave Hancock
Cabinet post (1)
Predecessor	Office	Successor
con'd from Redford ministry	Minister of Infrastructure; March 23, 2014–May 6, 2014	Wayne Drysdale
Alberta provincial government of Alison Redford
Cabinet posts (2)
Predecessor	Office	Successor
Wayne Drysdale	Minister of Infrastructure; December 6, 2013–March 23, 2014	con'd into Hancock ministry
Ray Danyluk	Minister of Transportation; May 8, 2012–December 6, 2013	Wayne Drysdale
