= Joe Ceci =

Canadian politician

The Honourable Joe Ceci ECA MLA
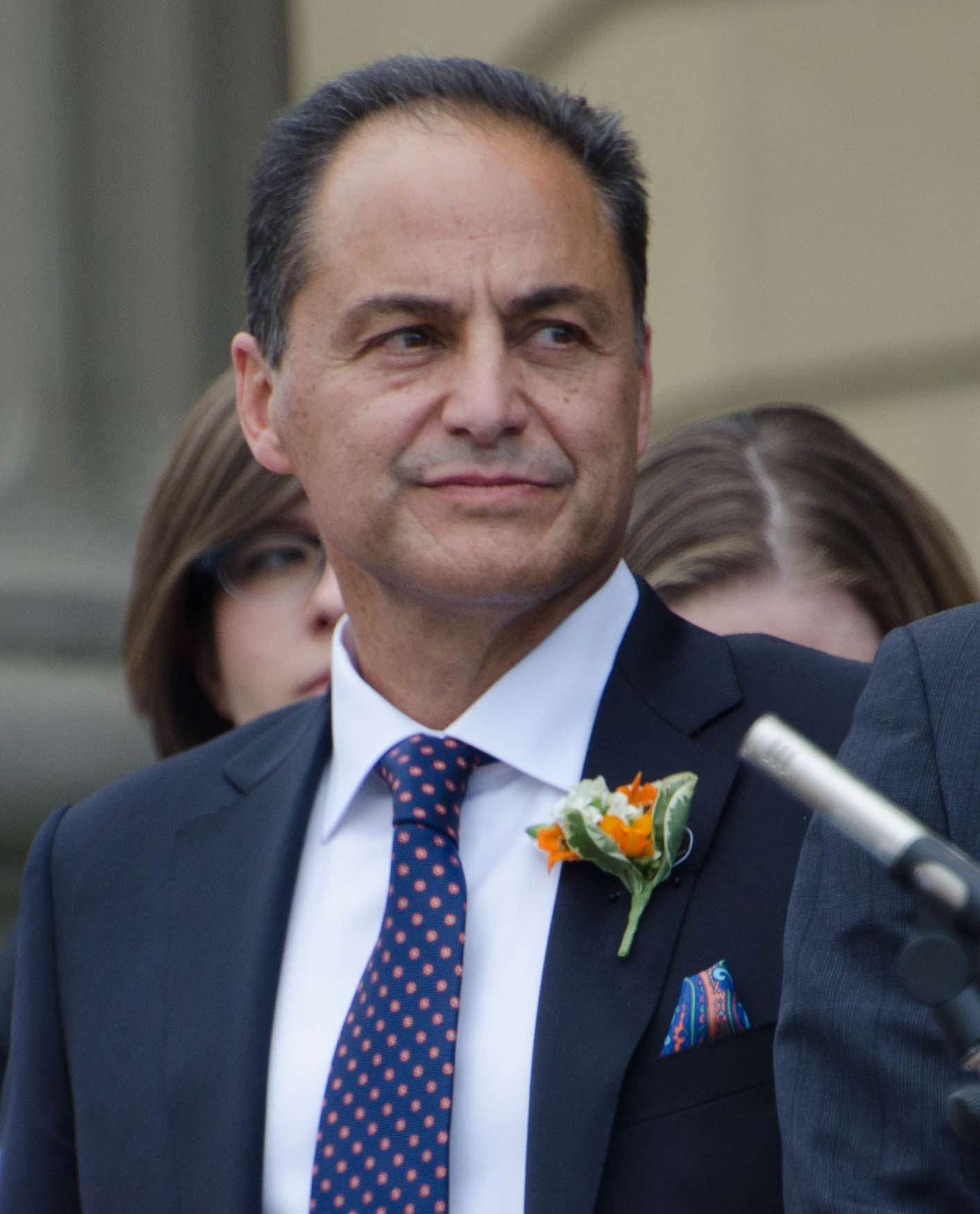
- Ceci in May 2015

Minister of Finance of Alberta President of the Treasury Board
- In office May 24, 2015 – April 30, 2019
- Preceded by: Robin Campbell
- Succeeded by: Travis Toews

Member of the Legislative Assembly of Alberta
- Incumbent
- Assumed office April 16, 2019
- Preceded by: Kathleen Ganley
- Constituency: Calgary-Buffalo
- In office May 5, 2015 – April 16, 2019
- Preceded by: Wayne Cao
- Succeeded by: district abolished
- Constituency: Calgary-Fort

Alderman for Calgary Ward 9
- In office 1995–2010

Personal details
- Born: Joseph Anthony Ceci; July 30, 1957 (age 69) Toronto, Ontario, Canada
- Party: New Democratic
- Spouse: Christine
- Education: University of Western Ontario; University of Calgary
- Occupation: Social Worker
- Portfolio: Minister of Finance & President of the Alberta Treasury Board

Joseph Anthony Ceci ECA MLA (born July 30, 1957) is a Canadian politician who was elected in the 2019 Alberta general election to represent the electoral district of Calgary-Buffalo in the 30th Alberta Legislature. He was previously elected in 2015 to represent Calgary-Fort in the 29th Legislature. He is a member of the Alberta New Democratic Party. Prior to holding provincial office, Ceci served as an alderman on the Calgary City Council, representing Ward 9 from 1995 to 2010.

== Background ==
Ceci was born in 1957 in Toronto, where he lived until 1976, following graduation from local high school Nelson A. Boylen Collegiate Institute. He received a Bachelor of Social Work degree from the University of Western Ontario in 1980. Later that year, he moved to Calgary, where he worked as a social worker. During this time, he attended the University of Calgary, where he received a master's degree in social work in 1989.

== Calgary alderman ==
He previously served on Calgary City Council as the alderman for Ward 9 from 1995 to 2010. In his 2004–2007 term he was a founding member community safety councils in Inglewood-Ramsay and Forest Lawn.

Ceci was challenged in the 2007 election by Al Koenig, president of the Calgary Police Association, who had criticized city council for not being "...as assertive on crime as we'd like to see"; Ceci defeated him by a wide margin. He retired from City Council in 2010, choosing to not run for re-election after 15 years on the Council.

== Provincial career ==
Touted as a star candidate, Ceci ran for the Alberta New Democratic Party in the 2015 Alberta general election for the electoral district of Calgary-Fort, hoping to become the first NDP MLA elected in Calgary since 1993, when Bob Hawkesworth was defeated in the riding of Calgary Mountain View. He won the riding with a majority of over 3000 votes and 49.8% of the popular vote; Progressive Conservative candidate Andy Nguyen finished second in the popular vote. On May 24, 2015, he was sworn in as Minister of Finance and President of the Treasury Board in the Alberta Cabinet. Ceci was re-elected in the 2019 provincial election, however the NDP lost government and therefore Ceci lost his cabinet position. As of June 21, 2024, he serves as the Official Opposition critic for Arts and Culture and also chairs the Official Opposition caucus.

== Electoral history ==
=== 2023 general election ===
2023 Alberta general election: Calgary-Buffalo
| Party | Candidate | Votes | % | ±% |
|---|---|---|---|---|
| New Democratic | Joe Ceci | 13,221 | 63.00 | +14.14 |
| United Conservative | Astrid Kuhn | 7,292 | 34.75 | -4.41 |
| Green | Jonathan Parks | 349 | 1.66 | -0.22 |
| Solidarity Movement | Lona Henry | 125 | 0.60 | – |
| Total | | 20,987 | 98.82 | – |
| Rejected and declined | | 250 | 1.18 | |
| Turnout | | 21,237 | 56.18 | |
| Eligible voters | | 37,801 | | |
| New Democratic hold | | Swing | | +9.28 |
Source(s) Source: Elections Alberta

=== 2019 general election ===
2019 Alberta general election: Calgary-Buffalo
| Party | Candidate | Votes | % | ±% | Expenditures |
|---|---|---|---|---|---|
| New Democratic | Joe Ceci | 11,292 | 48.86% | 13.75% | $56,232 |
| United Conservative | Tom Olsen | 9,050 | 39.16% | 0.92% | $60,374 |
| Alberta Party | Omar Masood | 1,597 | 6.91% | +4.01% | $24,282 |
| Liberal | Jennifer Khan | 590 | 2.55% | -22.11% | $500 |
| Green | Heather Morigeau | 436 | 1.89% | -0.09% | $534 |
| Alberta Independence | Cory Hetherington | 147 | 0.64% | – | $1,005 |
| Total | | 23,112 | – | – | |
| Rejected, spoiled and declined | | 290 | – | – | |
| Eligible electors / turnout | | 38,432 | 60.89% | 20.02% | |
| New Democratic hold | | Swing | | 1.34% | |
Source(s) Source: Elections Alberta Note: Expenses is the sum of "Election Expenses", "Other Expenses" and "Transfers Issued". The Elections Act limits "Election Expenses" to $50,000.

=== 2015 general election ===
2015 Alberta general election: Calgary-Fort
| Party | Candidate | Votes | % | ±% |
|---|---|---|---|---|
| New Democratic | Joe Ceci | 7,027 | 49.77% | 43.05% |
| Progressive Conservative | Andy Bao Nguyen | 3,204 | 22.69% | -18.25% |
| Wildrose | Jeevan Mangat | 3,003 | 21.27% | -18.46% |
| Liberal | Said Abdulbaki | 476 | 3.37% | -6.58% |
| Alberta Party | Vic Goosen | 410 | 2.90% | – |
| Total | | 14,120 | – | – |
| Rejected, spoiled and declined | | 114 | – | – |
| Eligible electors / turnout | | 32,411 | 43.92% | -0.06% |
| New Democratic gain from Progressive Conservative | | Swing | | 12.93% |
Source(s) Source: "12 - Calgary-Fort Official Results 2015 Alberta general election". officialresults.elections.ab.ca. Elections Alberta.
