= 2014 Progressive Conservative Association of Alberta leadership election =

- September 6, 2014
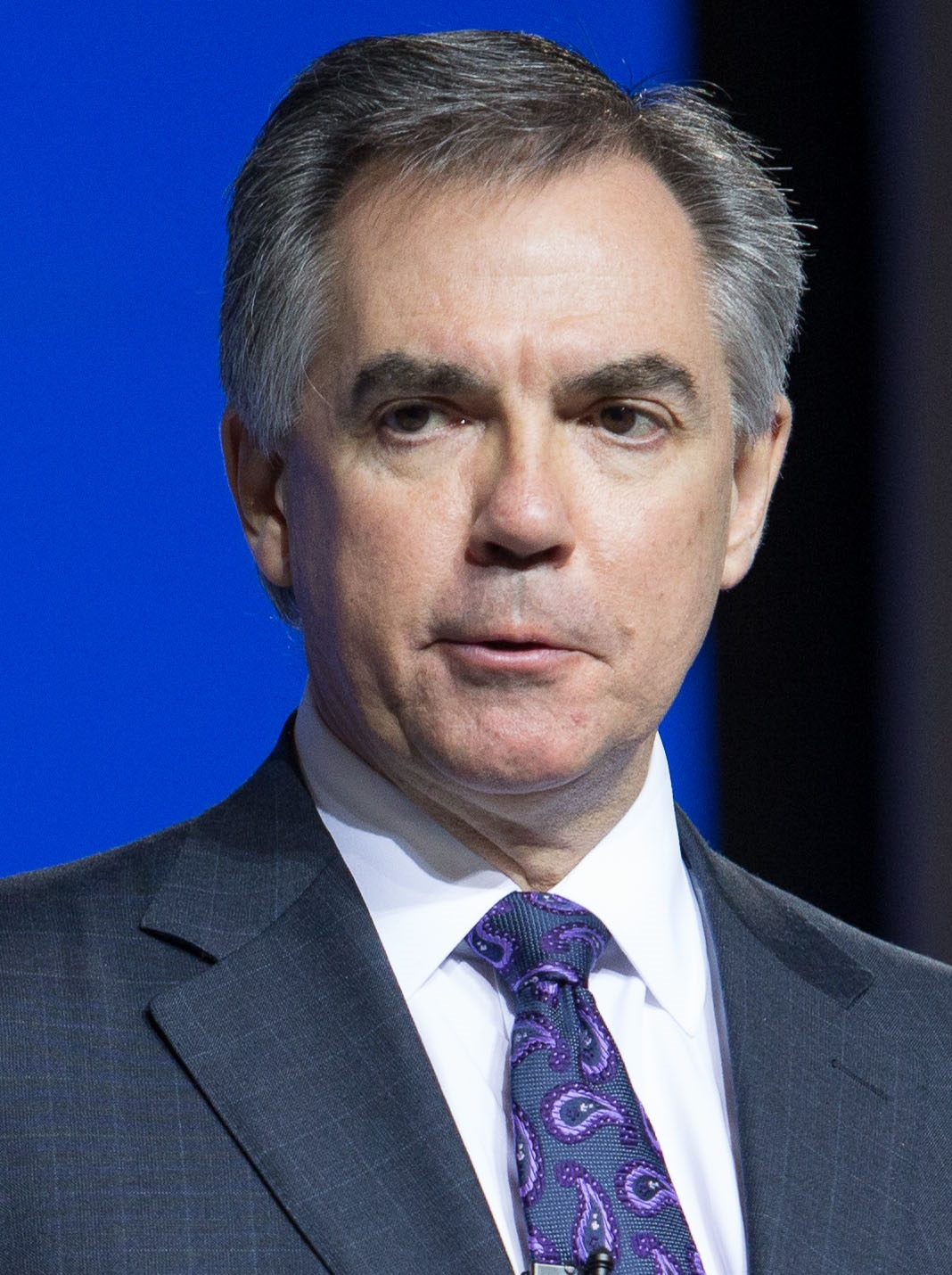

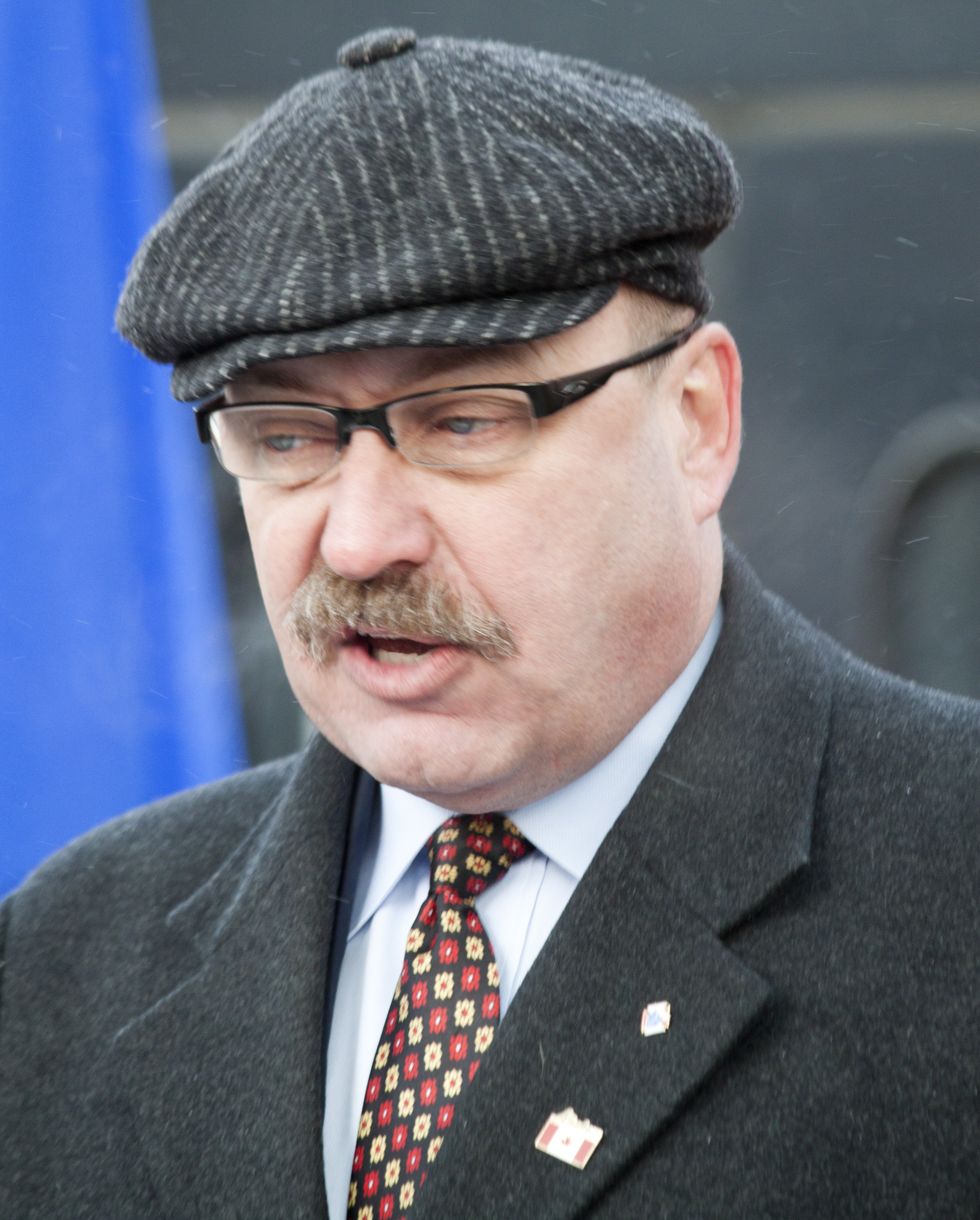

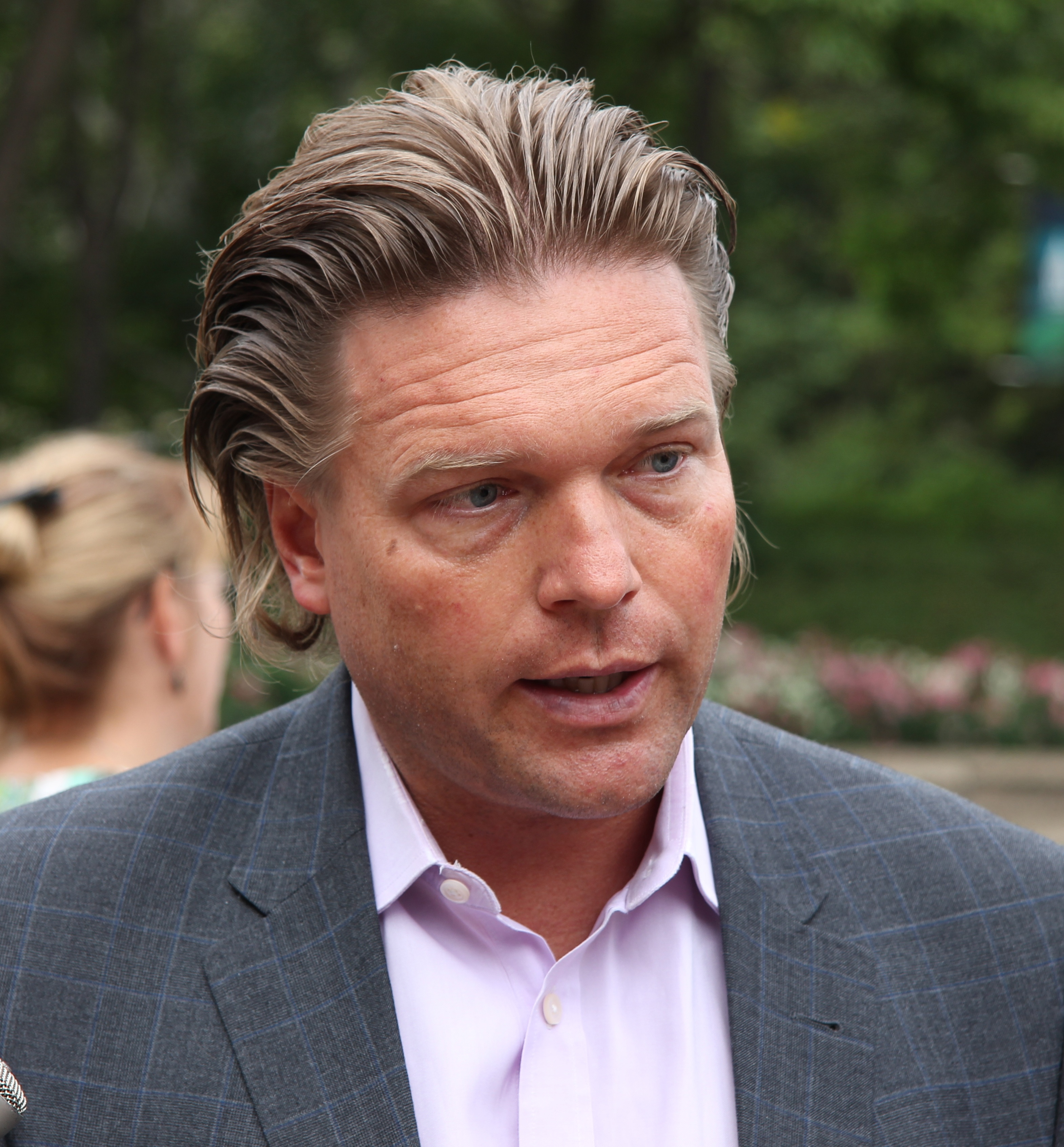
Candidate	Jim Prentice	Ric McIver	Thomas Lukaszuk
Party	Progressive Conservative	Progressive Conservative	Progressive Conservative
Popular vote	17,963	2,742	2,681
Percentage	76.81%	11.72%	11.46%
Leader before election
Dave Hancock
Elected Leader
Jim Prentice

2014 Progressive Conservative Association of Alberta leadership election
- Date: September 6, 2014
- Convention: Edmonton Expo Centre
- Resigning leader: Alison Redford
- Won by: Jim Prentice
- Ballots: 1
- Candidates: 3
- Entrance fee: $50,000 (non refundable)
- Spending limit: none, $30,000 donation limit

The 2014 Progressive Conservative Association of Alberta leadership election was prompted by Alison Redford's announcement that she would be resigning as leader of the Progressive Conservatives and Premier of Alberta on March 23, 2014.

According to the party's constitution, the process to select a new leader must take no less than four months and no more than six months from when the leader resigns. A Two-round system was chosen with September 6, 2014 set as the date for the first round of voting. If no candidate had received a majority, a second round of voting with the top two candidates on the ballot would have occurred on September 20. Unlike the 2011 leadership election a preferential ballot was not used. All party members were eligible to vote. Jim Prentice was elected on the first ballot.

Because the Progressive Conservatives form the government by virtue of holding a majority of seats in the Legislative Assembly of Alberta, in accordance with convention the winner of the leadership election was appointed by the Lieutenant Governor as Premier of Alberta. In the meantime, Dave Hancock served as interim PC leader and thus Premier.

To be nominated, a candidate had to gather at least 100 signatures from party members in each of the province's five regions, pay a non-refundable $50,000 deposit and be registered as a candidate with Elections Alberta.

== Timeline ==
- March 19, 2014 - Alison Redford announces her resignation as Premier and Progressive Conservative party leader, effective March 23.
- March 20, 2014 - Caucus chooses Deputy Premier Dave Hancock as interim leader and premier to hold office until a leadership election is held.
- March 23, 2014 - Redford's resignation takes effect.
- March 24, 2014 - Party executive meets to set the rules and dates for the leadership election.
- April 7, 2014 - Ken Hughes resigns as Minister of Municipal Affairs.
- April 11, 2014 - Hughes announces his candidacy.
- May 6, 2014 - Ric McIver resigns as Minister of Infrastructure.
- May 7, 2014 - McIver declares his candidacy.
- May 12, 2014 - Ken Hughes withdraws to support Jim Prentice's possible candidacy.
- May 15, 2014 - Nomination period officially opens; Prentice announces he is collecting signatures.
- May 16, 2014 - Prentice files his nomination papers with the required number of signatures and a deposit.
- May 21, 2014 - Prentice launches his campaign.
- May 22, 2014 - Thomas Lukaszuk resigns as Labour Minister, and announces his candidacy.
- May 26, 2014 - McIver files his nomination papers.
- May 30, 2014 - Nomination period officially closes at 4pm MT (UTC−6).
- June 2, 2014 - Official candidates formally introduced.
- August 15, 2014 - Final day that candidates can withdraw from ballot.
- September 6, 2014 - First round of voting, results are announced at Edmonton Expo Centre at 7:30 pm MT. Jim Prentice elected leader with 76% of the vote.
- September 15, 2014 - Prentice is sworn in as premier, as well as new cabinet ministers.
- September 20, 2014 - Second ballot would have been held between top 2 finishers from first round if no candidate had received 50% +1 of the votes cast in the first round, results were to have been announced at BMO Centre in Calgary.

== Candidates ==
=== Thomas Lukaszuk ===
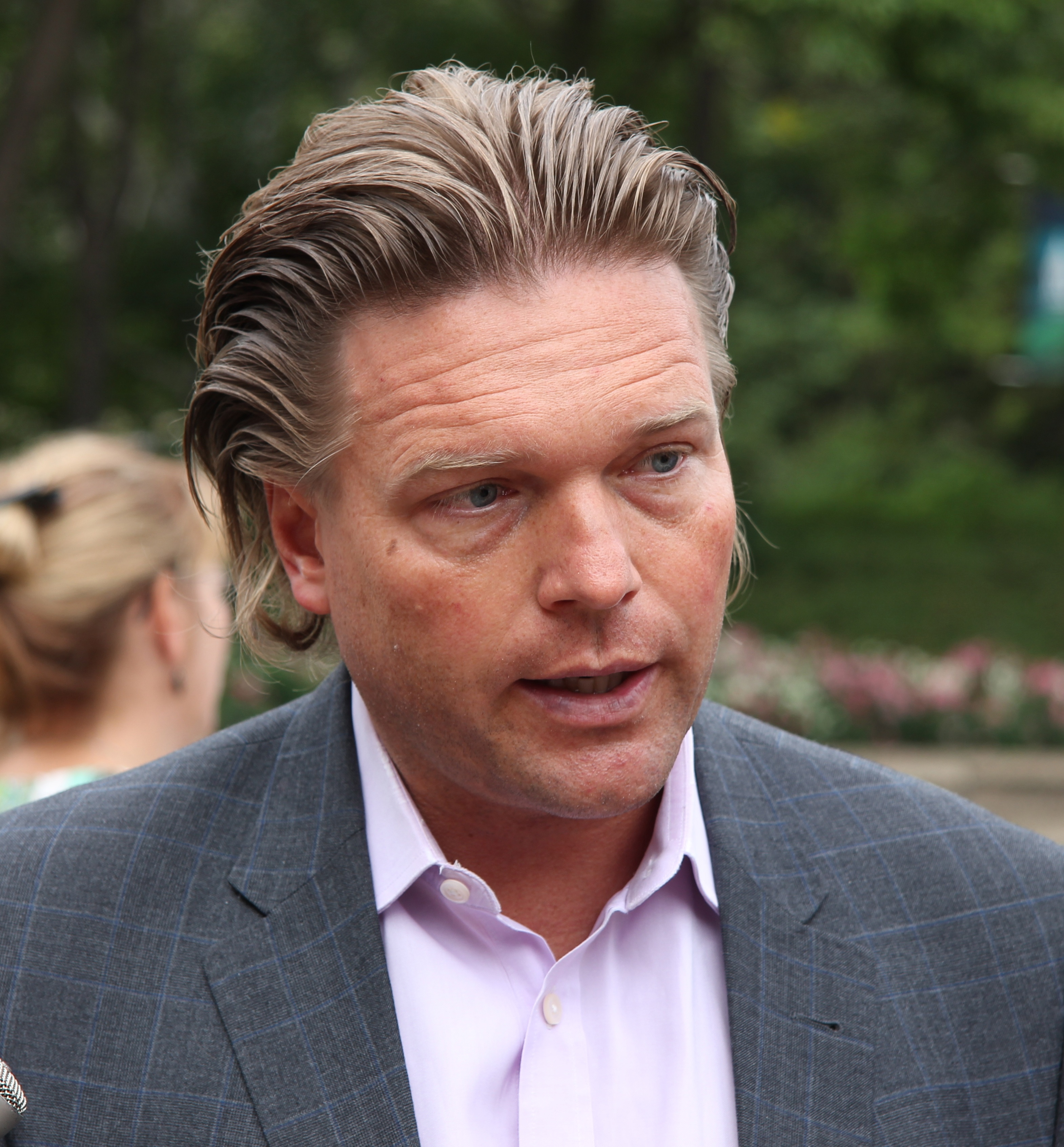
Thomas Lukaszuk

Background

MLA for Edmonton-Castle Downs since 2001. Served as Minister of Employment and Immigration (2010-2011), Minister of Education (2011-2013), Deputy Premier (2012-2013), Minister of Enterprise and Advanced Education (2013), and Labour Minister (2013-2014).

Date candidacy declared: May 22, 2014
Date officially nominated: May 30, 2014
Supporters
Support from caucus members:
Support from federal caucus members:
Support from former provincial caucus members:
Other prominent supporters:
Policies:

=== Ric McIver ===
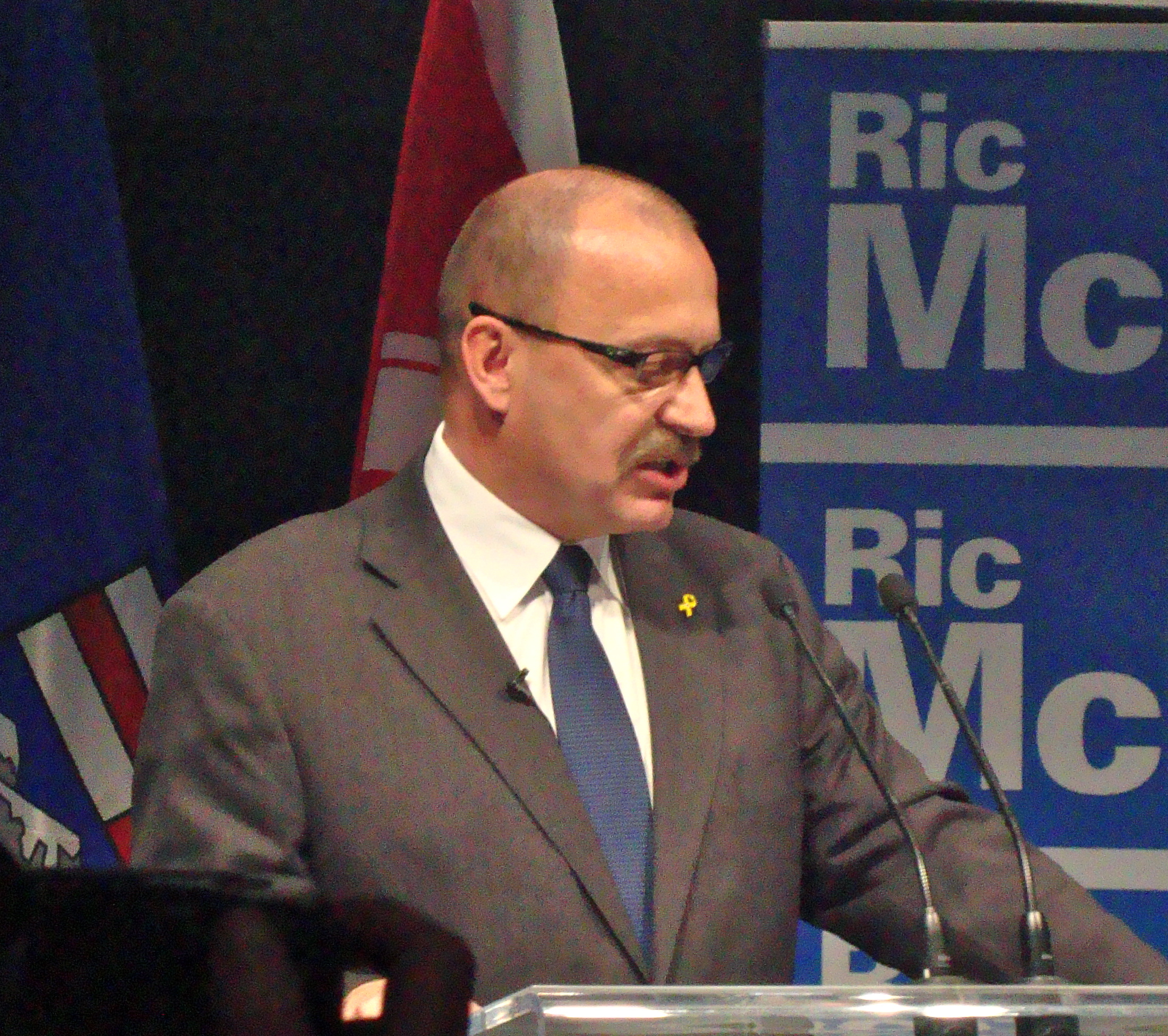
Ric McIver

Background

MLA for Calgary-Hays since 2012, previously councillor on Calgary City Council (2001-2010), runner up Mayoral candidate in the 2010 Calgary municipal election. McIver was Minister of Transportation (2012-2013) and then Minister of Infrastructure (2013-2014) until resigning to enter the leadership campaign.

Date candidacy declared: May 7, 2014
Date officially nominated: May 26, 2014
Supporters
Support from caucus members:
Support from federal caucus members:
Support from former provincial caucus members:
Other prominent supporters:
Policies:

=== Jim Prentice ===
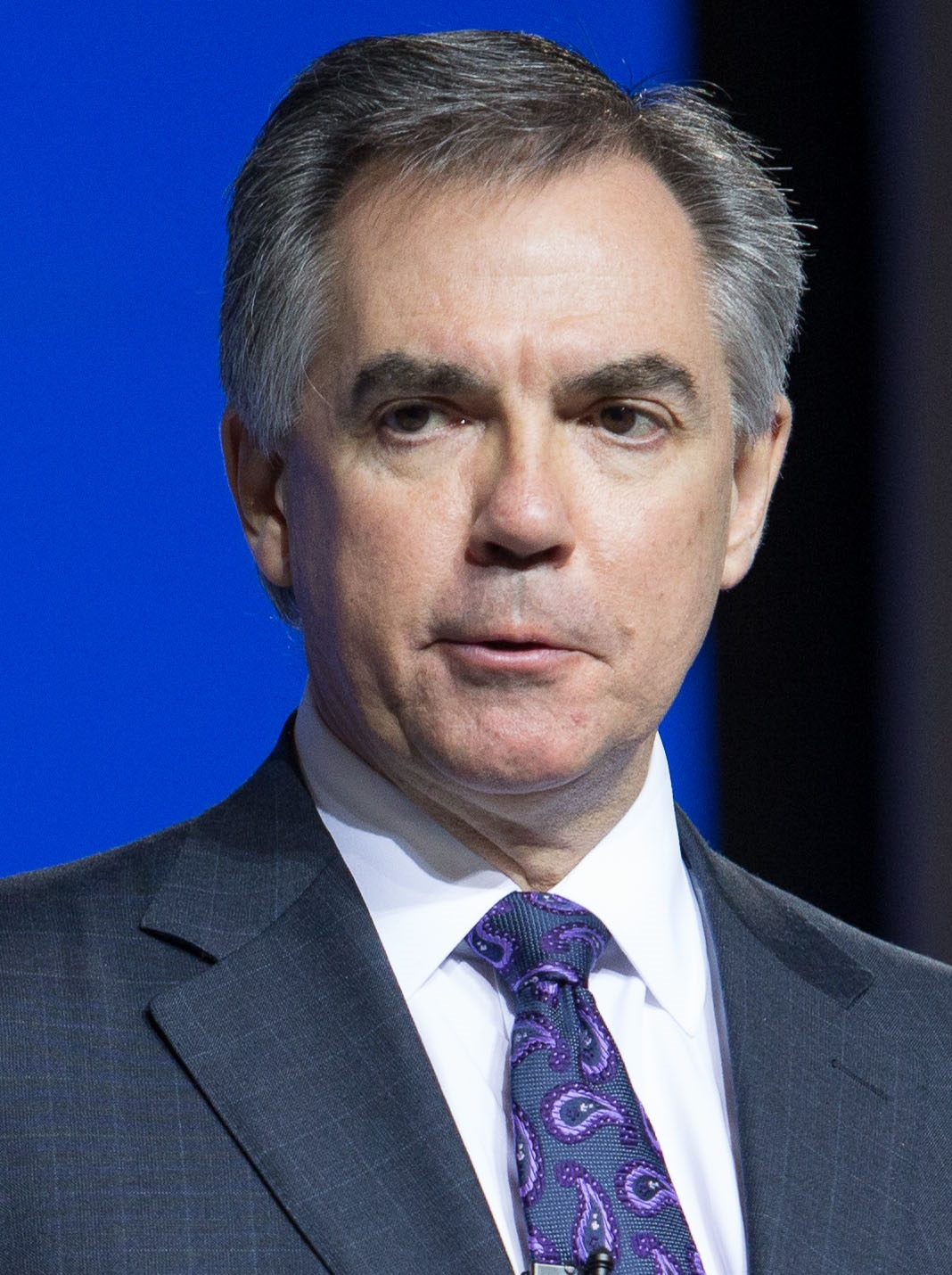
Jim Prentice

Background

MP for Calgary Centre-North (2004-2010), federal Minister of Indian Affairs and Northern Development (2006-2007), federal Minister of Industry (2007-2008), federal Minister of the Environment (2008-2010). Runner-up to Peter MacKay in the 2003 Progressive Conservative Party of Canada leadership election in which he advocated the merger of the federal Progressive Conservative Party of Canada and the Canadian Alliance. Since resigning from parliament, Prentice has served as vice-chairman of the Canadian Imperial Bank of Commerce.

Date candidacy declared: May 15, 2014
Date officially nominated: May 16, 2014
Supporters
Support from caucus members: Moe Amery (Calgary-East), Naresh Bhardwaj (Edmonton-Ellerslie), Manmeet Bhullar (Calgary-Greenway), Neil Brown (Calgary-Mackay-Nose Hill), Pearl Calahasen (Lesser-Slave Lake), Robin Campbell (West Yellowhead), Wayne Cao (Calgary-Fort), Christine Cusanelli (Calgary-Currie), Cal Dallas (Red Deer-South), Alana DeLong (Calgary-Bow), Jonathan Denis (Calgary-Acadia), David Dorward (Edmonton-Gold Bar), Wayne Drysdale (Grande Prairie-Wapiti), Kyle Fawcett (Calgary-Klein), Jacquie Fenske (Fort Saskatchewan-Vegreville), Yvonne Fritz (Calgary-Cross), Hector Goudreau (Dunvegan-Central Peace-Notley), Doug Griffiths (Battle River-Wainwright), Fred Horne (Edmonton-Rutherford), Doug Horner (Spruce Grove-St. Albert), Ken Hughes (Calgary-West), Mary Anne Jablonski (Red Deer-North), Sandra Jansen (Calgary-North West), Matt Jeneroux (Edmonton-South West), Jeff Johnson (Athabasca-Sturgeon-Redwater), Heather Klimchuk (Edmonton-Glenora), Maureen Kubinec (Barrhead-Morinville-Westlock), Ken Lemke (Stony Plain), Genia Leskiw (Bonnyville-Cold Lake), Jason Luan (Calgary-Hawkwood), Everett McDonald (Grande Prairie-Smoky), Diana McQueen (Drayton Valley-Devon), Frank Oberle (Peace River), Cathy Olesen (Sherwood Park), Verlyn Olson (Wetaskiwin-Camrose), Sohail Quadri (Edmonton-Mill Woods), David Quest (Strathcona-Sherwood Park), Dave Rodney (Calgary-Lougheed), George Rogers (Leduc-Beaumont), Peter Sandhu (Edmonton-Manning), Janice Sarich (Edmonton-Decore), Don Scott (Fort McMurray-Conklin), Greg Weadick (Lethbridge-West), Teresa Woo-Paw (Calgary-Northern Hills), David Xiao (Edmonton-McClung), Steve Young (Edmonton-Riverview)
Support from federal caucus members:
Support from former provincial caucus members: Shirley McClellan, former cabinet minister;
Support from former federal caucus members: Jay Hill, former cabinet minister;
Other prominent supporters: Stephen Mandel, former Mayor of Edmonton (2004-2013), Patricia Mitsuka, municipal politician
Policies:

== Withdrawn ==
=== Ken Hughes ===
MLA for Calgary-West since 2012, previously Member of Parliament for Macleod (1988-1993). Hughes was Chair of Alberta Health Services (2008-2011) before re-entering politics and served in the provincial cabinet as Minister of Energy (2012-2013) and Minister of Municipal Affairs (2012-2014) until resigning to contest the leadership. Hughes had declared his intention to run but withdrew prior to the official opening of nominations in order to support Jim Prentice's prospective candidacy.

Date candidacy declared: April 11, 2014
Date withdrawn: May 12, 2014
Support from caucus members: Ron Casey (Banff-Cochrane), Jason Luan (Calgary-Hawkwood),

== Declined ==
- Federal Health Minister Rona Ambrose (MP for Edmonton—Spruce Grove)
- Human Services Minister Manmeet Bhullar (Calgary-Montrose)
- Justice Minister Jonathan Denis (Calgary-Acadia)
- Former provincial treasurer Jim Dinning
- Service Alberta Minister Doug Griffiths (Battle River-Wainwright)
- Premier and interim leader Dave Hancock (Edmonton-Whitemud)
- Finance Minister Doug Horner (Spruce Grove-St. Albert)
- Education Minister Jeff Johnson (Athabasca-Redwater)
- Former associate minister for energy and Independent MLA Donna Kennedy-Glans (Calgary-Varsity)
- Federal Employment Minister Jason Kenney (MP for Calgary Southeast)
- Member of Parliament Mike Lake (Edmonton—Mill Woods—Beaumont)
- Former Edmonton mayor Stephen Mandel
- Former minister Gary Mar who placed second in the 2011 leadership election
- Energy Minister Diana McQueen (Drayton Valley-Calmar)
- Member of Parliament James Rajotte (Edmonton—Leduc)
- Federal Western Economic Development Minister Michelle Rempel (MP for Calgary Centre-North)
- Former party president Bill Smith
- Senator Scott Tannas
- Independent MLA Len Webber (Calgary-Foothills)

== Results ==
The first and only ballot was held on September 6, 2014.

Candidate	Votes	Percentage
Jim Prentice	17,963	76.81
Ric McIver	2,742	11.72
Thomas Lukaszuk	2,681	11.46
Total	23,386	100.00

(Source: CBC News)

== See also ==
- Progressive Conservative Association of Alberta leadership elections
