= David Goatley =

David Goatley may refer to:

- David Goatley (artist) (born 1954), Canadian portrait painter
- David Emmanuel Goatley (born 1961), American theologian
