= Jim Prentice =

Premier of Alberta from 2014 to 2015

The Honourable Jim Prentice PC QC
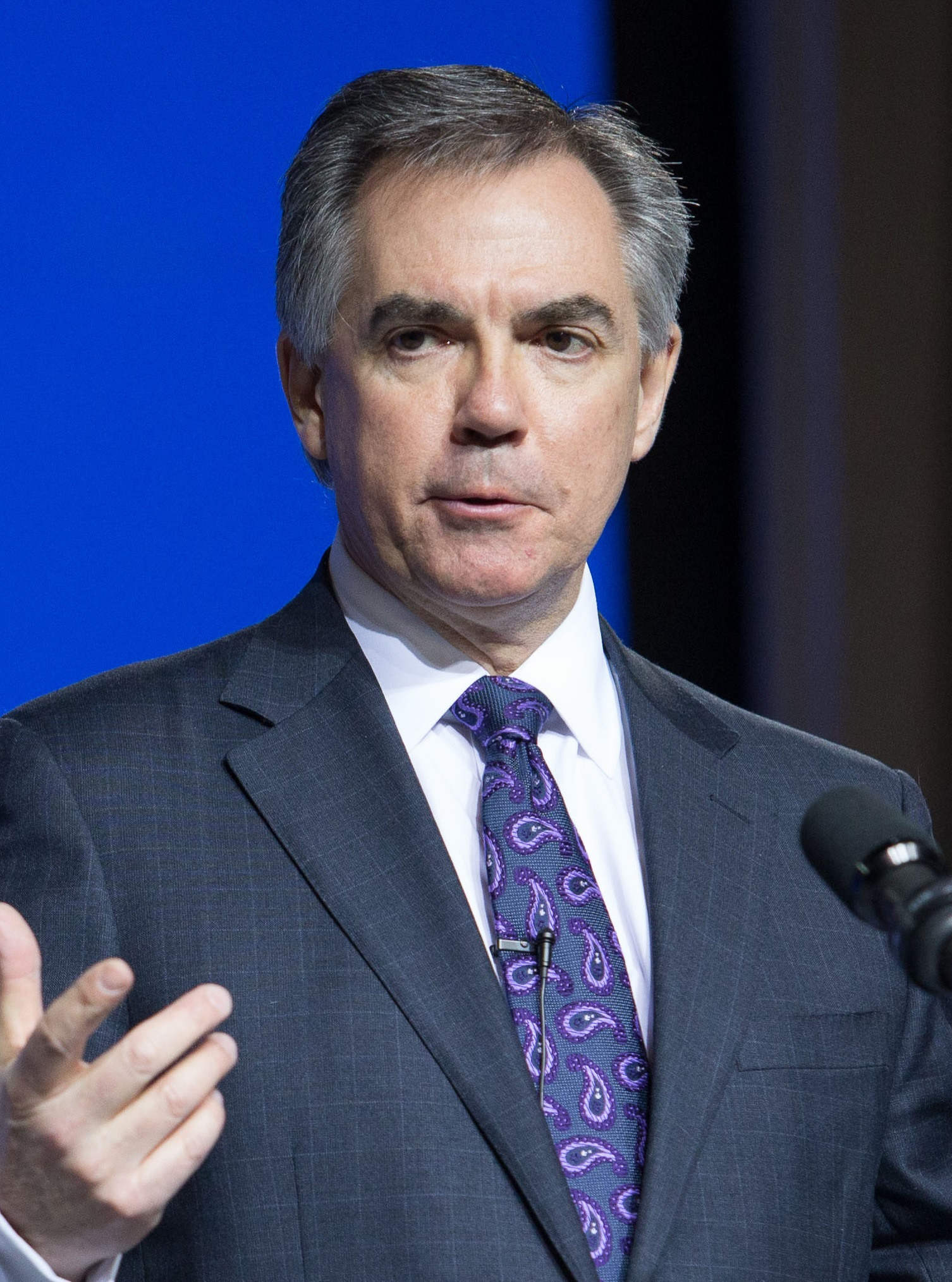
- Prentice in 2014

16th Premier of Alberta
- In office September 15, 2014 – May 24, 2015
- Monarch: Elizabeth II
- Lieutenant Governor: Donald Ethell
- Preceded by: Dave Hancock
- Succeeded by: Rachel Notley

Leader of the Progressive Conservative Association of Alberta
- In office September 6, 2014 – May 5, 2015
- Preceded by: Dave Hancock (interim)
- Succeeded by: Ric McIver (interim)
28th Canadian Ministry
Minister of the Environment
In office October 30, 2008 – November 4, 2010
Prime Minister	Stephen Harper
Preceded by	John Baird
Succeeded by	John Baird
Minister of Western Economic Diversification
In office October 30, 2008 – November 4, 2010
Prime Minister	Stephen Harper
Preceded by	Rona Ambrose
Succeeded by	Rona Ambrose
Minister of Industry
In office August 14, 2007 – October 30, 2008
Prime Minister	Stephen Harper
Preceded by	Maxime Bernier
Succeeded by	Tony Clement
Minister of Indian Affairs and Northern Development
In office February 6, 2006 – August 14, 2007
Prime Minister	Stephen Harper
Preceded by	Andy Scott
Succeeded by	Chuck Strahl
Parliamentary constituencies
Member of the Legislative Assembly of Alberta for Calgary-Foothills
In office October 27, 2014 – May 5, 2015
Preceded by	Len Webber
Succeeded by	Prasad Panda
Member of Parliament for Calgary Centre-North
In office June 28, 2004 – November 14, 2010
Preceded by	Riding established
Succeeded by	Michelle Rempel Garner (2011)

Personal details
- Born: Peter Eric James Prentice; July 20, 1956 South Porcupine, Ontario, Canada
- Died: October 13, 2016 (aged 60) Lake Country, British Columbia, Canada
- Cause of death: Plane crash
- Party: Provincial: Progressive Conservative; Federal: Progressive Conservative (1976–2003); Conservative (2003–his death)
- Spouse: Karen Prentice
- Children: 3
- Education: University of Alberta; Dalhousie University
- Profession: Lawyer

Peter Eric James Prentice PC QC (July 20, 1956 – October 13, 2016) was a Canadian politician who served as the 16th premier of Alberta from 2014 to 2015. In the 2004 federal election he was elected to the House of Commons of Canada as a candidate of the Conservative Party of Canada. He was re-elected in the 2006 federal election and appointed to the cabinet as Minister of Indian Affairs and Northern Development and Federal Interlocutor for Métis and Non-Status Indians. Prentice was appointed Minister of Industry on August 14, 2007, and after the 2008 election became Minister of Environment on October 30, 2008. On November 4, 2010, Prentice announced his resignation from cabinet and as MP for Calgary Centre-North. After retiring from federal politics he entered the private sector as vice-chairman of CIBC.

Prentice entered provincial politics in his home province of Alberta, and ran for the leadership of the Progressive Conservative Association of Alberta to replace Dave Hancock, who was serving as Premier and interim party leader after Alison Redford's resignation. On September 6, 2014, Prentice won the leadership election, becoming both the leader of the Progressive Conservatives and as such the Premier, as his party held a majority in the Legislative Assembly of Alberta. As Premier of Alberta, Prentice formed a new cabinet consisting of some members from the previous government, but also new Ministers including two who did not hold seats in the Legislature—Stephen Mandel and Gordon Dirks. All three stood as candidates in by-elections scheduled for October 27, 2014, and all three were elected with Prentice becoming the MLA for Calgary-Foothills. After introducing his first budget in 2015, Prentice declared an early provincial election on May 5, 2015. In the election, Prentice's PCs suffered an unprecedented defeat, dropping to third place in the legislature with just 10 seats – ending 44 years of Tory rule in Alberta, the longest consecutive reign for any political party at the provincial level in Canada. Despite winning re-election in Calgary-Foothills, on election night Prentice resigned as both PC leader and MLA and retired from politics after results indicated that the Alberta NDP had won a majority government.

On October 13, 2016, Prentice and three others were killed when the aircraft in which they were travelling crashed shortly after taking off from Kelowna, British Columbia. The flight was en route from Kelowna to Springbank Airport, just outside Calgary.

== Background ==
Prentice was born to a large, blue-collar family in South Porcupine, near Timmins, Ontario. The family then moved to Alberta in 1969. He was the son of Wilma Lyle Marea (Mawhiney) and Eric Prentice, a professional hockey player who played five games in the National Hockey League (NHL) in the 1940s. His uncle Dean Prentice played in the NHL for more than 20 years. Prentice was educated at the University of Alberta (where he became a member of the Phi Gamma Delta fraternity) and Dalhousie University. He paid for his tuition by working as a coal miner in the summer months for seven years.

As a lawyer, he served as a Law Commissioner of the Indian Claims Commission of Canada.

In his personal life, Prentice served for seven years on the Board of Directors at the Calgary Winter Club, including stints as president and Chairman. He was an active member and volunteer leader in the Grace Presbyterian Church. Prentice and his wife Karen have three daughters and two grandchildren.

He was also a member of the Trilateral Commission, a non-partisan organization that aims to increase cooperation within the developed world. In this capacity, Prentice was one of 20 Canadian members.

== Early political career ==
Prentice joined the Progressive Conservative Party of Canada in 1976, and was active in Tory circles ever since. In the 1986 provincial election, Prentice ran for the Progressive Conservatives in Calgary Mountain View, being defeated by NDP candidate Bob Hawkesworth.

During the early 1990s, Prentice served as the governing federal PC party's chief financial officer and treasurer (1990–93). Prentice first ran for Parliament as the nominated Progressive Conservative candidate in a spring 2002 by-election in the riding of Calgary Southwest that followed the retirement of Preston Manning as the riding's Member of Parliament (MP). When newly elected Canadian Alliance leader Stephen Harper replaced nominated CA candidate Ezra Levant in the by-election, Prentice withdrew from the race, following common practice to allow a party leader to win a seat uncontested so they may lead their party within Parliament.

He ran in the 2003 Progressive Conservative leadership election to support the "United Alternative" proposal to merge the PC party with the Canadian Alliance. He was seen by many as an alternative to the "status quo" candidate and front runner Peter MacKay. A basic platform of Prentice's campaign was that "no one has ever defeated the Liberals with a divided conservative family." Prentice entered the 2003 convention day with some momentum, after delivering a passionate speech to the assembled delegates that encouraged Tories to be proud of their accomplishments, despite recent setbacks, and that recalled the sacrifices of Canadian soldiers who fought in the Battle of Passchendaele. He also unexpectedly received the support of fellow leadership challenger Craig Chandler, who withdrew early. Prentice ultimately emerged in second-place on the fourth ballot to the eventual winner MacKay. Consistent with his positions during the leadership race, Prentice was a supporter of the merger endorsed by both the CA and PC parties in December 2003 that formed the new Conservative Party of Canada.

Prentice was the first declared candidate for the leadership of the new Conservative Party, announcing his run on December 7, 2003, the day after the new party was ratified by members of the PC Party. Prentice began his campaign in Calgary and toured parts of Ontario, specifically visiting Kingston, Ontario, the hometown of the first conservative leader Sir John A. Macdonald. However, he withdrew from the race on January 12, 2004, citing difficulty in raising new funds less than a year after his unsuccessful first leadership bid. The leadership election was won by Stephen Harper, who later became Prime Minister of Canada after the 2006 Canadian federal election.

== Early parliamentary career ==
Prentice ran in the riding of Calgary Centre-North in the 2004 election for the new Conservative Party, and won the seat with 54% of the popular vote.

After being sworn in as the MP for Calgary Centre North on July 16, Conservative Party Leader Stephen Harper named Prentice to the Shadow Cabinet as the Official Opposition Critic for Indian and Northern Affairs. In that role Prentice opposed the Tli Cho land claim agreement, which he said would make Canadian law secondary to Tlicho local law. Prentice was also a strong supporter of the proposed and controversial Mackenzie Valley pipeline. He criticized the Liberal government for its treatment of aboriginal women, and its alleged costs of administering the Residential School Claims program for aboriginal victims of abuse.

Prentice described himself as a Red Tory in the Conservative Party and surprised many observers when he was one of three Conservative MPs that voted in favour of Bill C-38 supporting same-sex marriage.

== Minister of Indian Affairs and Northern Development ==
Prentice had been assigned the Minister of Aboriginal Affairs and Northern Development in the Conservative government, and was sworn into this role on February 6, 2006, until August 13, 2007. One of his main challenges as Minister was to implement "The Nunavut Project," a 2006 report authored by Thomas Berger, to show tangible, measurable results to increase Inuit representation in the Nunavut public services.

=== Kelowna Accord and residential schools ===
In the fall of 2006, Phil Fontaine, National chief of the Assembly of First Nations, expressed disappointment over the Conservative government's refusal to honour the Kelowna Accord, endorsed by 14 jurisdictions (the federal government, 10 provinces, and three territories). Fontaine previously described the federal government's point person on Kelowna, Jim Prentice, as an "honourable" person sensitive to native concerns. Prior to January 2006 election, Fontaine and two vice-chiefs of the Assembly of First Nations had a meeting with Prentice. "[Prentice] acknowledged all the hard work that went into Kelowna and (said) that the Conservative party would not put this aside," says Fontaine. "We took him at his word." Prentice did not recall saying that: "I've always been very, very careful about what I've said about Kelowna," According to Fontaine, in their first meeting after the 2006 election, "(Prentice) wanted to apply a very focused approach to his responsibilities." In the federal budget of May 2006, Fontaine and other native leaders got a glimpse of what "focused" meant: just $450 million (over two years) was committed to implementing Kelowna, not the $1.64 billion for the first two years that Paul Martin had agreed to.

Prentice argued that there was actually $3.7 billion in spending on native peoples in the May 2006 budget, "more than the previous four budgets in total." That figure includes $2.2 billion in compensation for victims of abuse in residential schools (another deal that was worked out with the previous government) and $300 million for off-reserve housing.

On June 11, 2008, Prime Minister Stephen Harper thanked Jim Prentice for his work on addressing the matter of the Indian residential schools and providing a government apology for the residential school system. Stephen Harper's thanks to Prentice came before he made the apology to former students of the schools.

== Minister of Industry ==
In a cabinet shuffle on August 14, 2007, Prentice became Minister of Industry, succeeding Maxime Bernier.

=== Copyright legislation and controversy ===
Bringing "Canada into WIPO treaty compliance" had been stated as one of Prentice's goals in future copyright legislation. It has been pointed out repeatedly, however, that at the time of Prentice's statement of his rationale for introducing amendments to the Copyright Act, there was no international legal obligation to implement any provision of the World Intellectual Property Organization (WIPO) Copyright Treaty (WCT) or the WIPO Performances & Phonograms Treaty (WPPT) since neither had been ratified by Canada. Prentice has promised to "put consumers first." claiming in an editorial that "(C-61) allows the recording of webcasts and TV and radio programs to be enjoyed at different times" while ignoring the fact that if the files are protected by digital rights management (DRM) it is illegal to break the DRM to make the recording. Michael Geist, Canada Research Chair of Internet and E-commerce Law at the University of Ottawa, has suggested that the core desire of the draft legislation is "to satisfy U.S. pressure by enacting something very close to the U.S. Digital Millennium Copyright Act".

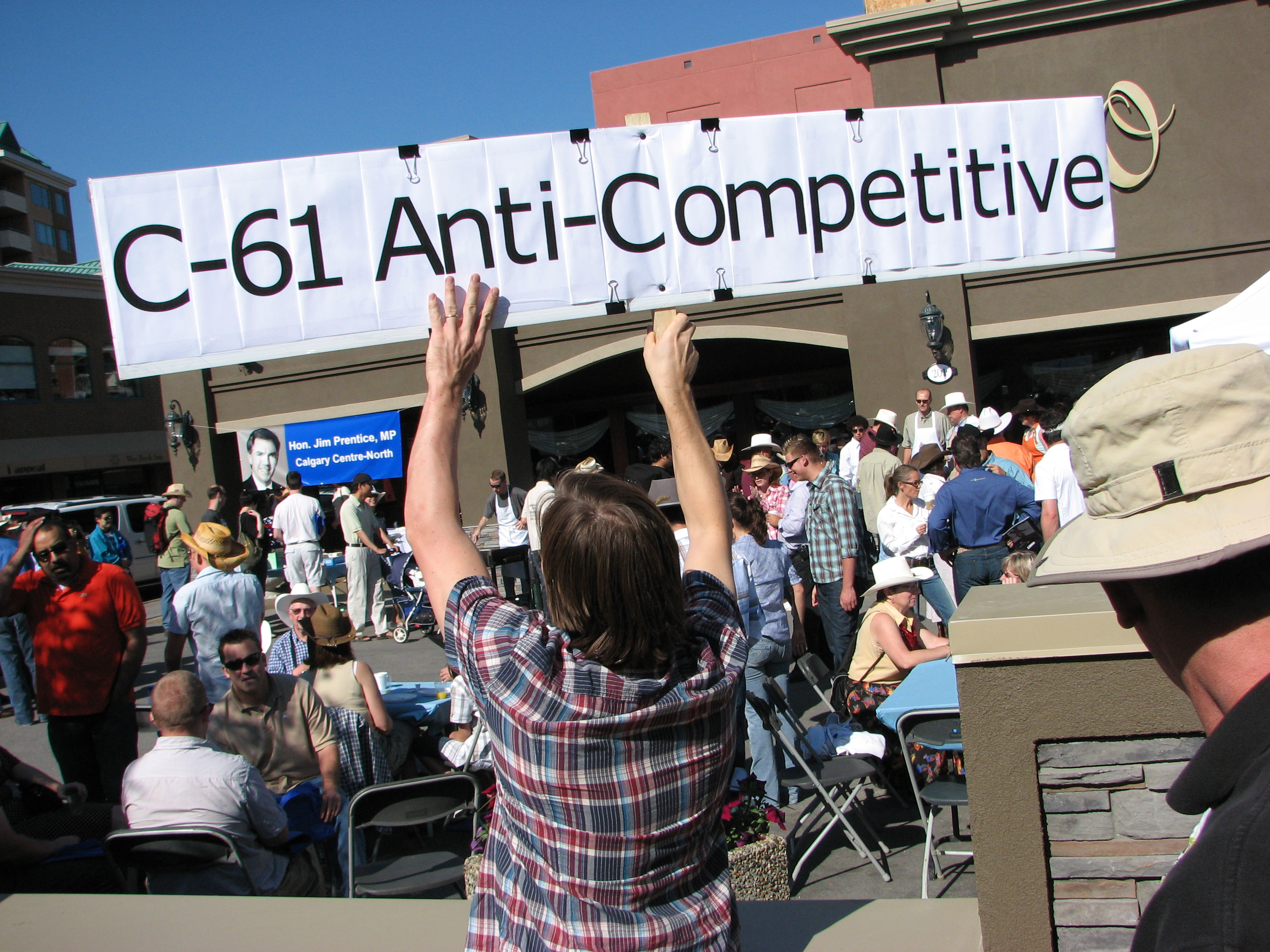
An opponent of the proposed Bill C-61 holds up a protest sign at a public breakfast event held during the Calgary Stampede by Canadian Industry Minister Jim Prentice.

Prentice did not immediately provide a rationale for not discussing the issue with CBC Radio Canada despite the hundreds of questions that flooded in from concerned Canadians. He also refused to talk to a group of protesters who went to his office to express their concern, stating "When Canadian Heritage Minister Josée Verner and I have reached a consensus and we're satisfied, we will introduce a bill." Prentice has also implied that he will not follow the Government's policy to table the WCT & WPPT 21 days prior to introducing copyright amendments designed to implement parts of these treaties contrary to the Government's policy on treaty implementation. Industry Canada announced on June 11, 2008, that Prentice "will deliver brief statements and answer media inquiries shortly after the tabling of a bill to amend the Copyright Act ... [on] Thursday, June 12, 2008". After less than two hours, hundreds of Canadians and critics panned the new Bill C-61 as nothing more than pandering to US interests at the expense of Canadians.

On a 10-minute interview with the CBC's Search Engine radio program he dismissed any question related to digital rights management as "extremely technical" and claimed that the market will take care of copy protected CDs. Prentice then hung up mid question and refused to continue the interview at a later time. Most notably, Jim Prentice hung up before answering Jesse Brown's final question about who, under this bill, would have the power to investigate potential copyright violations.

=== Wikipedia controversy ===
During the period of May 27, 2008, to June 4, 2008, edits originating from an IP address belonging to Industry Canada were made to the Jim Prentice article on Wikipedia. The edits included the removal of references to new copyright legislation (claiming that it did not exist) and the addition of two passages about Prentice's recent accomplishments as Minister of Industry. Specifically, information about the copyright controversy was deleted from Prentice's biography by someone using an Industry Canada IP address.

Jay Walsh, spokesman for the Wikimedia Foundation, said in an interview there are tens of thousands of living people with biographies on Wikipedia, "so challenges about information are not uncommon." Walsh said neutrality of language and guarding against conflicts of interest are two of the central pillars of Wikipedia. He said, "The edits which should be trusted would come from people who don't possess a conflict of interest, in this case, it would be worthwhile saying that if someone is making edits from a computer within the government of Canada … if it was someone within that ministry, that would theoretically constitute a conflict of interest."

=== Auto industry ===
In a February 29, 2008, speech to the Toronto Board of Trade Prentice rejected the concept of direct subsidies to the auto industry, insisting that setting up a strong economic foundation is a better route to strengthen the business. Former Liberal Leader Stéphane Dion said Finance Minister Jim Flaherty should be fired after the planned shutdown of the GM truck plant in Oshawa, Ont., with Prentice and Flaherty expressing hope for a new GM plant.

=== Net neutrality ===
While serving as a Federal Cabinet minister, Prentice received criticism that he was sidestepping the issue of Canada's net neutrality laws by not providing clear answers regarding the government's position on internet throttling practices by national Internet Service Providers (ISPs). New Democratic Party MP Charlie Angus raised the issue to Prentice in the House of Commons and said the government's "hands off" approach was bad for Canadian innovation. Prentice said that the issue is being appropriately handled by the Federal government agency the Canadian Radio-television and Telecommunications Commission (CRTC), which invited the general public to an open debate on net neutrality.

=== Text messaging fees ===
After initially appearing to take a stand on the issue, Prentice refused to intervene when Telus and Bell started charging 15 cents for incoming SMS text messages despite widespread opposition by consumer groups. This decision was made after Prentice dialogued with senior Bell and Telus executives and suggested that consumers "seek alternatives", even in Canada's limited-competition cellular industry.

== Minister of the Environment ==
On October 30, 2008, Prentice was sworn in as Minister of the Environment in the Conservative Government. During his tenure, funding for the CFCAS (Canadian Foundation for Climate and Atmospheric Sciences) was not renewed, which some argued lead to a brain drain in the climate scientific community.

=== Draft Prentice Movement ===
Shortly after the Conservative government faced a possible defeat by the opposition over the Conservatives economic update, a "Conservatives for Prentice" website emerged, gaining a place on the Blogging Tories blogroll. A posting from a person claiming to be David Higginbottom, Prentice's campaign manager in the last election, said, "It is unfortunate that at a time when Conservatives need to be working together to prevent what is a desperate power play by the opposition to seize control of our democratically elected government, that a site like this would be created."

=== Resignation ===
On November 4, 2010, Prentice announced he was resigning as Environment Minister effective immediately and that he would be resigning as Member of Parliament for Calgary Centre-North by the end of the year to take a job as vice-chairman of the Canadian Imperial Bank of Commerce.

Prentice suggested that his departure was for family reasons; he had committed to spending 10 years in politics, and at that point he had. He expressed a desire to step down so he could explore new opportunities in his life. His resignation raised some questions with the opposition; NDP leader Jack Layton expressed concern over the apparent connection between Ministers and the large banks.

== Premier of Alberta ==
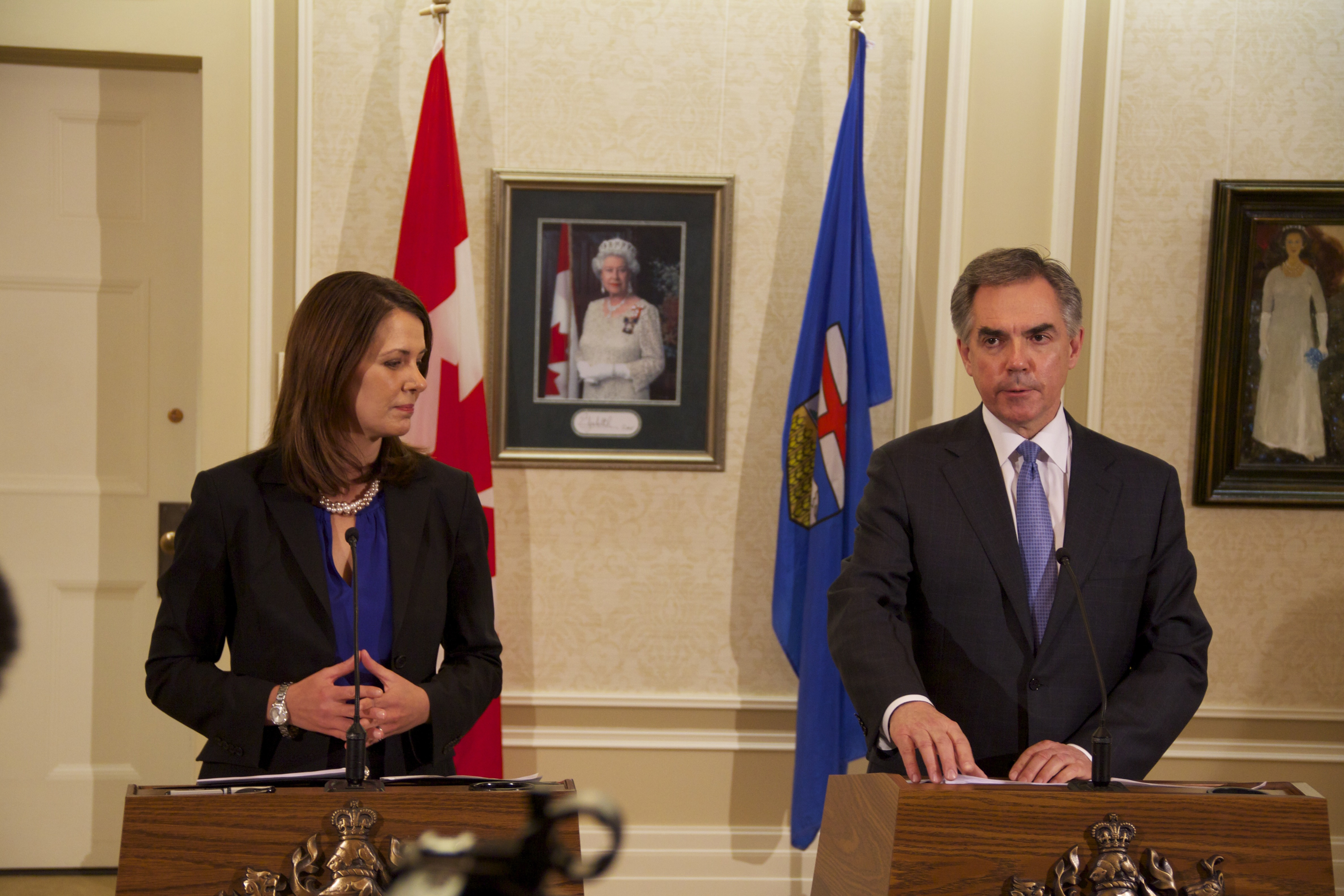
Prentice and Danielle Smith announcing that Smith and eight other Wildrose MLAs would be crossing the floor to join the Progressive Conservatives

Though previously rumoured to have been interested in succeeding Stephen Harper as federal Conservative leader, Prentice entered the 2014 Alberta Progressive Conservative leadership election on May 15, 2014. At the time the Alberta PC party was lagging badly in polls behind the opposition Wildrose due to personal expense controversies with Allison Redford, who resigned as premier and party leader after facing a revolt from the caucus and riding associations, with Dave Hancock serving in these roles for the interim. On September 6, 2014, Prentice won the leadership race with more than 76% of the vote on the first ballot (the leadership contest was conducted using Instant-runoff voting).

Prentice was formally sworn in as premier on September 15, 2014. He immediately named a 20-member Executive Council of Alberta, smaller than the cabinet had been under recent premiers. His recommendations for cabinet appointments included two people, former Edmonton mayor Stephen Mandel and former Calgary Board of Education trustee Gordon Dirks, who were not members of the Legislative Assembly. Prentice was elected to the legislature in a by-election in Calgary-Foothills, the seat formerly held by MLA Len Webber. The PCs won all four of the provincial by-elections held on October 27, 2014, in what was seen at the time as a major electoral success for Prentice.

On November 24, 2014, Wildrose Party MLAs Kerry Towle, (Innisfail-Sylvan Lake), and Ian Donovan, (Little Bow) crossed the floor to join the ruling PC Party's caucus giving the turmoil within the Wildrose Party, uncertainty about the leadership of Danielle Smith and confidence in Prentice as reasons for their move.

On December 17, 2014, in a highly unusual move within any parliament using the Westminster system, Leader of the Opposition Danielle Smith confirmed that she and eight other Wildrose members – Rob Anderson, Gary Bikman, Rod Fox, Jason Hale, Bruce McAllister, Blake Pedersen, Bruce Rowe and Jeff Wilson – would cross the floor to the Progressive Conservative caucus. At a press conference, Smith said that her conversations with Prentice revealed that they shared so much common ground that it made little sense for her to continue in opposition. "If you’re going to be the official Opposition leader," she said, "you have to really want to take down the government and really take down the premier. I don't want to take down this premier. I want this premier to succeed." The defections were termed by a journalist as "an unprecedented move in Canadian political history", although they did not change the overall make-up of the legislature – the Conservatives still held a vast majority of the seats, and the Wildrose Party remained the Official Opposition.

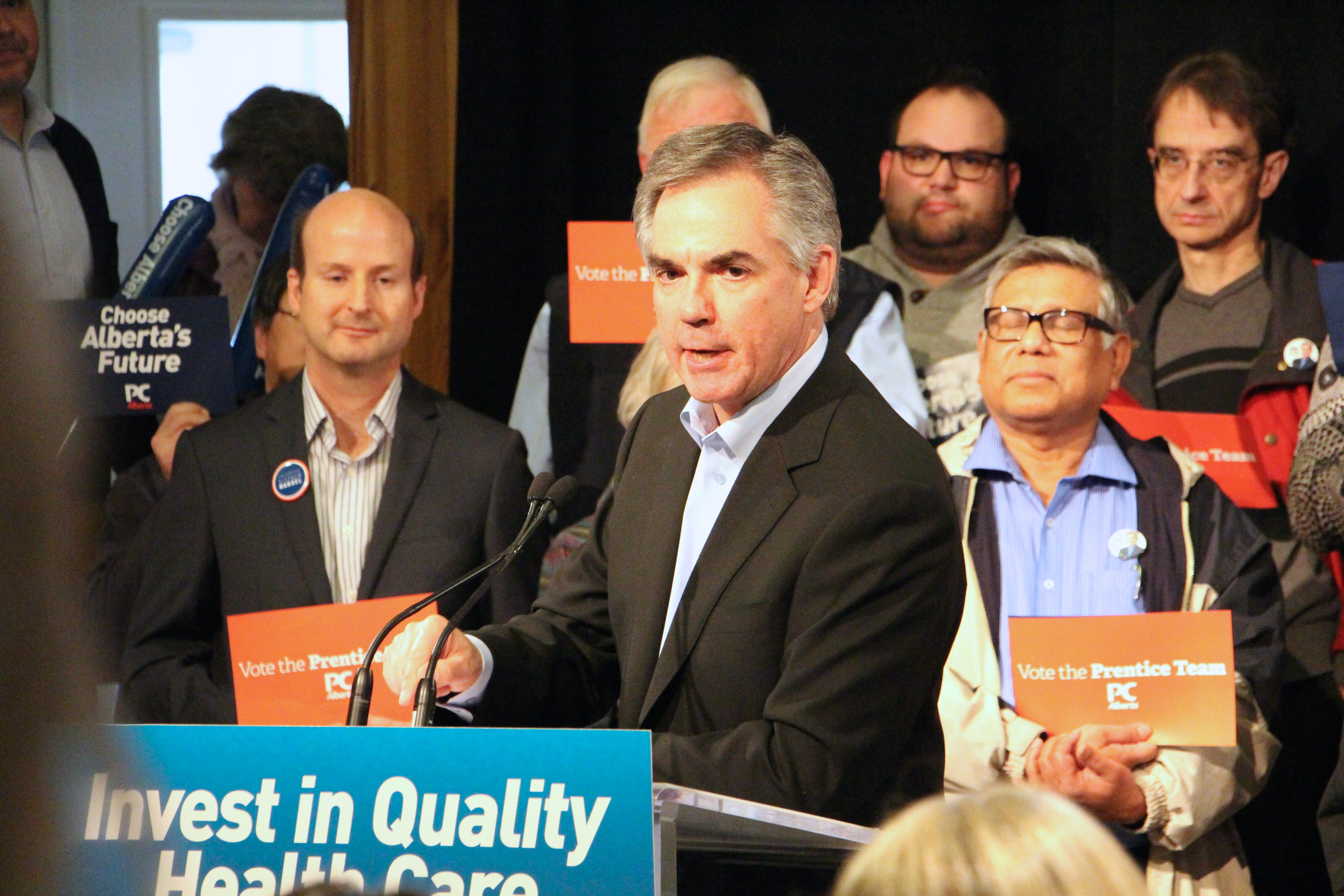
Prentice at a campaign stop at the Whitemud Creek Community Centre in Edmonton during the 2015 election

Prentice's March 2015 budget "raised a plethora of taxes and fees to help pay the province's way out of its hole, but he refuses to touch corporate taxes, because he is spooked by the prospect of investors skipping over Alberta for their next billion-dollar energy project, in favour of some more clement petro-state somewhere else. This array of taxes on you and your friends, but not on the C-Suite in Calgary’s office-tower jungle, has provoked populists on the left and right". In retrospect, Ron Kneebone of the University of Calgary’s School of Public Policy defended Prentice's budget saying "'We've got to look in the mirror.' He got tossed for it. But he was absolutely right because he said, 'You guys keep electing us for spending all this money.'"

On April 7, 2015, Prentice advised the Lieutenant Governor to call an early election for May 5 claiming that he needed to seek a new mandate in order to pass his budget, a full year before he was mandated to by the provincial fixed-election law of an election every four years (by the constitution, the incumbent government could run for up to five years before the writ had to be dropped in 2017). The Progressive Conservatives were already lagging in polls behind the resurgent Wildrose Party led by Brian Jean, as Prentice's pre-election budget was deeply unpopular with both the left and right in the political spectrum while only "business leaders thought it was tough but fair". Several gaffes by Prentice hurt him and his party in the campaign, including a comment before the election call in which Prentice appeared to be blaming Albertans, telling them that they had to "look in the mirror" to understand the root cause of Alberta's "serious budget shortfall"; Alberta Party leader Greg Clark dubbed this “Mr. Prentice’s Alice in Wonderland moment because it’s only in some alternate reality that the blame for decades of PC mismanagement can be placed squarely on Albertans". There was an "embarrassing miscalculation in the proposed NDP budget" released two days before the debate that Prentice planned to capitalize upon; during the televised leaders' debate Prentice said "I know math is difficult" to Alberta New Democratic Party leader Rachel Notley in criticizing the "multibillion-dollar hole in [her] proposed budget", however Prentice's remark came under fire for as being deeply patronizing as well as potentially sexist. While Prentice otherwise performed respectably ahead of Wildrose leader Brian Jean and interim Liberal leader David Swann, the NDP gained momentum as a result of the debate and overtook Wildrose for the lead in polls.

The provincial election ended the Progressive Conservatives' 44-year run in government, with the Alberta New Democratic Party winning a majority government, the first time the party had been elected to government in the province's history. The Progressive Conservatives fell to third place in the legislature, with 10 seats, behind both the NDP and the Wildrose Party. While the PCs placed second in terms of the popular vote, their caucus was decimated due to being completely shut out in Edmonton and losing all but eight seats in Calgary. Thirteen members of Prentice's cabinet were defeated, though Prentice himself was re-elected in Calgary-Foothills. However, with the overall result beyond doubt, he resigned as PC leader, disclaimed his seat (thus voiding the election result in his riding) and retired from politics.

During the transition of power, Prentice advised Premier-designate Notley to continue settlement talks with the Lubicon Lake Band. The band had been seeking an agreement for 80 years, and Prentice had reopened negotiations in the fall of 2014. Notley recalled "He saw a path forward and he advised me how to travel that path, for which I, and many, many others, are very grateful", and the land claim deal was reached in late 2018.

== After politics ==
Prentice served as a visiting global fellow at the Canada Institute at the Wilson Center in Washington, D.C., for a four-month term that begun in February 2016. At the Wilson Center, he wrote the book Triple Crown: Winning Canada’s Energy Future with Jean-Sebastien Rioux that was published posthumously by HarperCollins on February 21, 2017.

Prentice was appointed as a senior advisor to private equity firm Warburg Pincus LLC in June 2016, specializing in the energy industry.

== Death ==
Prentice was among the four people killed in the October 13, 2016, crash of a twin-engine Cessna Citation 500 business jet in Lake Country, British Columbia, shortly after takeoff from Kelowna International Airport en route to Springbank Airport near Calgary. He had spent the day golfing in the Kelowna area and was returning home. In April 2018, the Transportation Safety Board of Canada reported that while no conclusive reason for the crash could be determined, it was likely that the pilot had experienced spatial disorientation shortly after takeoff, having had little experience flying at night.

A state funeral was held for Prentice on October 28, 2016. Numerous dignitaries were in attendance, including former Prime Minister Stephen Harper, interim federal Conservative leader Rona Ambrose, Alberta Premier Rachel Notley, British Columbia Premier Christy Clark, Calgary Mayor Naheed Nenshi, Green Party Leader Elizabeth May, former prime minister Joe Clark and former federal opposition leader Preston Manning.

Prentice's official portrait as Premier of Alberta was unveiled on February 4, 2019. Painted by David Goatley, it depicts Prentice "standing on the third floor of the Alberta legislature, hands resting on the marble railing, eyes looking off in the distance. The expression and gaze shows Jim's sense of vision. He's thinking of the future and not the past." At the ceremony of the portrait unveiling, his widow Karen recalled that Prentice was "one who couldn't resist meeting with school tours when they passed by his office. He would invite them in, show them around, and give each of them the opportunity to sit in the premier's chair. I honestly believe his hope was that the experience would inspire more than one of these children to become involved in politics one day, and perhaps even become premier".

== Electoral record ==
2008 Canadian federal election: Calgary Centre-North
Party	Candidate	Votes	%	±%	Expenditures
Conservative	Jim Prentice	27,361	56.54	+0.54	$69,415.18
New Democratic	John Chan	7,413	15.32	–1.46	$24,843.71
Green	Eric Donovan	7,392	15.27	+3.46	$19,802.30
Liberal	Doug James	5,699	11.78	–1.92	$12,025.64
Libertarian	Jason E. McNeil	345	0.71	–	$3,354.62
Marxist–Leninist	Margaret Peggy Askin	184	0.38	+0.03	none listed
Total valid votes/expense limit		48,394	99.64	–	$88,581.95
Total rejected ballots		177	0.36	–0.02	
Turnout		48,571	56.29	–7.51	
Eligible voters		86,287			
Conservative hold		Swing		–0.46	
Source: Library of Parliament

2006 Canadian federal election: Calgary Centre-North
Party	Candidate	Votes	%	±%	Expenditures
Conservative	Jim Prentice	31,174	56.00	+1.81	$68,692.06
New Democratic	John Chan	9,341	16.78	+4.65	$20,639.09
Liberal	Matthew Moody	7,628	13.70	–7.66	$15,651.89
Green	Mark MacGillivray	6,573	11.81	+0.57	$7,133.24
Independent	Michael Falconar	383	0.69	–0.04	$1,118.01
First Peoples National	Doug Dokis	206	0.37	–	$717.70
Marxist–Leninist	Margaret Peggy Askin	194	0.35	+0.00	$60.00
Canadian Action	James Kohut	168	0.30	–	none listed
Total valid votes/expense limit		55,667	99.62	–	$84,783.07
Total rejected ballots		213	0.38	+0.02	
Turnout		55,880	63.80	+2.83	
Eligible voters		87,581			
Conservative hold		Swing		+3.23	
Source: Library of Parliament

2004 Canadian federal election: Calgary North Centre
Party	Candidate	Votes	%	±%	Expenditures
Conservative	Jim Prentice	28,143	54.19	–	$54,480.31
Liberal	Cathy McClusky	11,093	21.36	–	$43,209.00
New Democratic	John Chan	6,298	12.13	–	$15,356.72
Green	Mark MacGillivray	5,840	11.24	–	$4,032.78
Independent	Michael Falconar	380	0.73	–	$3,176.06
Marxist–Leninist	Margaret Peggy Askin	184	0.35	–	none listed
Total valid votes/expense limit		51,938	99.64	–	$81,240.04
Total rejected ballots		188	0.36	–	
Turnout		52,126	60.97	–	
Eligible voters		85,490			
Conservative gain from		Swing		N/A	
Source: Elections Canada

28th Canadian Ministry (2006–2015) – Cabinet of Stephen Harper
Cabinet posts (4)
Predecessor	Office	Successor
John Baird	Minister of the Environment; October 30, 2008 – November 4, 2010	John Baird
Rona Ambrose	Minister of Western Economic Diversification; October 30, 2008 – November 4, 2010	Rona Ambrose
Maxime Bernier	Minister of Industry; August 14, 2007 – October 30, 2008	Tony Clement
Andy Scott	Minister of Indian Affairs and Northern Development; February 6, 2006 – August 14, 2007	Chuck Strahl
Special Cabinet Responsibilities
Predecessor	Title	Successor
Andy Scott	Federal Interlocutor for Métis and Non-Status Indians; February 6, 2006 – August 14, 2007	Chuck Strahl
