= Canadian Action Party candidates in the 2006 Canadian federal election =

The Canadian Action Party fielded a number of candidates in the 2006 federal election, none of whom were elected. Information about these candidates may be found here.

== Alberta ==
=== James Stephen Kohut (Calgary Centre-North) ===
Kohut was born in 1964 in Calgary, where he still resides. He has a business administration diploma from SAIT, where he also studied petroleum geology technology. He has worked in the oil patch since 1981, and was listed in 2006 as a junior pipeline surveyor.

Kohut is a perennial candidate for public office. He joined Mel Hurtig's National Party of Canada in 1993, and later campaigned for the Green Party of Canada and the Alberta Greens. He wrote in support of the Kyoto Accord and against government subsidies for oil companies, while also calling for lower gas prices for consumers (Calgary Herald, 23 December 2001).

He campaigned for election to the Calgary municipal council in 2004, arguing against corporate donations and calling for surplus funds to go to the city's food bank (Calgary Herald, 4 October 2004). He also supported non-smoking by-laws (Calgary Herald, 8 October 2004). Kohut once again a candidate for Calgary Alderman in the upcoming ( Oct 15, 2007) municipal election.

He has twice campaigned federally for the Canadian Action Party, and has sought election at the municipal level.

Electoral record
Election	Division	Party	Votes	%	Place	Winner
2000 federal	Calgary Southeast	Green	931		5/5	Jason Kenney, Canadian Alliance
2001 provincial	Calgary-Glenmore	Green	467		3/4	Ron Stevens, Progressive Conservative
federal by-election, 13 May 2002	Calgary Southwest	Green	660	3.58	3/5	Stephen Harper, Canadian Alliance
2004 federal	Calgary West	CAP	315		5/6	Rob Anders, Conservative
2004 municipal	Calgary, Ward Six	-	2252	18.77	2/2	Craig Burrows
2004 provincial	Calgary-West	Green	731		4/5	Ron Liepert, Progressive Conservative
2006 federal	Calgary Centre-North	CAP	168		8/8	Jim Prentice, Conservative

The 2004 municipal results are taken from the Calgary Herald, 19 October 2004.

== Manitoba ==
=== Magnus Thompson (Winnipeg South Centre) ===
Thompson is a frequent candidate for the Canadian Action Party, having previously campaigned under its banner in 2000 and 2004. He was 67 years old during the 2004 campaign, and described his occupation as "research and development".

He has described Canada's decision to join the North American Free Trade Agreement (NAFTA) as "the worst damn stupidest thing we could have done", and called for its repeal (Winnipeg Free Press, 10 June 2004).

Electoral record
Election	Division	Party	Votes	%	Place	Winner
2000 federal	Winnipeg South Centre	CAP	202	0.54	6/7	Anita Neville, Liberal
2004 federal	Winnipeg South Centre	CAP	114		6/7	Anita Neville, Liberal
2006 federal	Winnipeg South Centre	CAP	66		7/7	Anita Neville, Liberal

== Ontario ==
=== Tony Des Lauriers (Hamilton Centre) ===
Des Lauriers was born in Vancouver, British Columbia, but moved to Hamilton in his childhood. He is a Personal Support Worker and former restaurant manager in Hamilton, and was twenty-four years old at the time of the election. He campaigned against "tabloid politics", and called for a renegotiation of NAFTA (Hamilton Spectator, 13 January 2006). He received 332 votes (0.69%), finishing fifth against New Democratic Party incumbent David Christopherson.

=== Jerry Ackerman (Lanark—Frontenac—Lennox and Addington) ===
Ackerman was born on the Wagerville-5th Depot road between Tamworth and Parham, small communities in the Frontenac section of the riding. He holds a Bachelor of Arts degree from Cornell University, a Master of Science from the University of Toronto, and a PhD from Purdue University in agricultural economics. He taught at the University of Manitoba, and later worked in the tourism, hotel and restaurant business in Nova Scotia before returning to eastern Ontario to build a retirement cottage. He sported long silver hair during the campaign, and has described himself as a Willie Nelson lookalike. One newspaper article described him as an "anti-NAFTA crusader".

He received 429 votes (0.72%), finishing seventh against Conservative incumbent Scott Reid.

=== Randy Bens (Ottawa West—Nepean) ===
Bens was born in Cold Lake, Alberta, and has a Bachelor of Arts degree in English from the University of Ottawa. He has a strong background in the labour movement, and has worked as an organizer for the Newspaper Guild and the International Brotherhood of Teamsters, as well as small local unions. He also worked to assist the homeless in Ottawa. He was thirty-five years old during the election, and listed himself as an internet marketing specialist and business owner.

He received 121 votes (0.20%), finishing sixth against Conservative candidate John Baird.

=== Tom Cochrane (Whitby—Oshawa) ===
Cochrane was fifty-three years old at the time of the election, with thirty-five years experience in industrial catering and as a restaurant owner. He listed himself as self-employed. He received 217 votes (0.32%), finishing sixth against Conservative candidate Jim Flaherty.
