= Stephen Randall (political scientist) =

Stephen Randall FRSC

Personal details
- Born: Toronto, Ontario
- Education: University of Toronto
- Profession: Professor

Stephen James Randall, CM FRSC is a professor emeritus of History at the University of Calgary, former director of the University of Calgary's Latin America Research Centre and the Institute for United states Policy Research, author, academic, civil-right advocate, oil policy expert, and more recently a progressive political activist.

== Academic ==
Randall has taught at the University of Toronto (1971–74), McGill University (1974-1989), the University of Calgary (1989-2013). He was a visiting professor at San Diego State University and held the Fulbright Chair in North American Studies at American University in Washington. He held the Imperial Oil-Lincoln McKay Chair in american Studies at the University of Calgary, 1989-1996 and was the Dean, Faculty of Social Sciences 1994-2006. He was Director of the Institute for United States Policy Research and subsequently director of the Latin American Research Centre at the University of Calgary. Randall's scholarship has focused on Canada-United States relations, and inter-American relations with a particular focus on Colombia.

== Personal ==
Randall was born in Toronto, Ontario in 1944. He and his wife, Dr. M. Anne Katzenberg, live in Charleswood Heights in Calgary, Alberta.

== Human Rights, Civil Liberties ==
He was the first president of the Rocky Mountain Civil Liberties association. He has had the honour to work in international elections in Nicaragua, El Salvador, Venezuela, Jamaica and Cambodia with the United Nations, the Carter Presidential Centre and the Organization of American States. International observers and election workers have played important roles in ensuring that all citizens have had the opportunity to vote in free and open elections.

== Honours ==
Randall is an elected member of the Royal Society of Canada; a fellow of the Canadian Council for the Americas and the Centre for Military and Security Studies at the University of Calgary. He was honoured with the Award of Merit, Grand Cross and the Order of San Carlos by the government of Colombia for his contributions to an understanding of Colombian history and foreign policy. He received a lifetime public service award from the Canadian Council for the Americas.

In 2024, he was appointed to the Order of Canada.

== Political activism ==
On January 7, 2011, Randall was nominated as the Liberal Party of Canada candidate in Calgary Centre-North for the 41st Canadian federal election.

=== Electoral record ===
2011 Canadian federal election
Party	Candidate	Votes	%	±%	Expenditures
Conservative	Michelle Rempel	28,443	56.53	±0.00	$82,363.77
New Democratic	Paul Vargis	8,048	15.99	+0.67	$15,914.50
Liberal	Stephen Randall	7,046	14.00	+2.23	$55,742.32
Green	Heather MacIntosh	6,578	13.07	-2.22	$42,457.33
Marxist–Leninist	Peggy Askin	203	0.40	+0.02	$0.00
Total valid votes/Expense limit		50,318	100.00		$
Total rejected ballots		200	0.40	–	
Turnout		50,518	60.55	–	
Eligible voters		83,431	–	–	

== Selected publications ==
John Herd Thompson; Stephen J Randall (1994) Canada and the United States: ambivalent allies, Athens: University of Georgia Press
