= Michelle Rempel Garner =

Canadian politician

The Honourable Michelle Rempel Garner PC MP
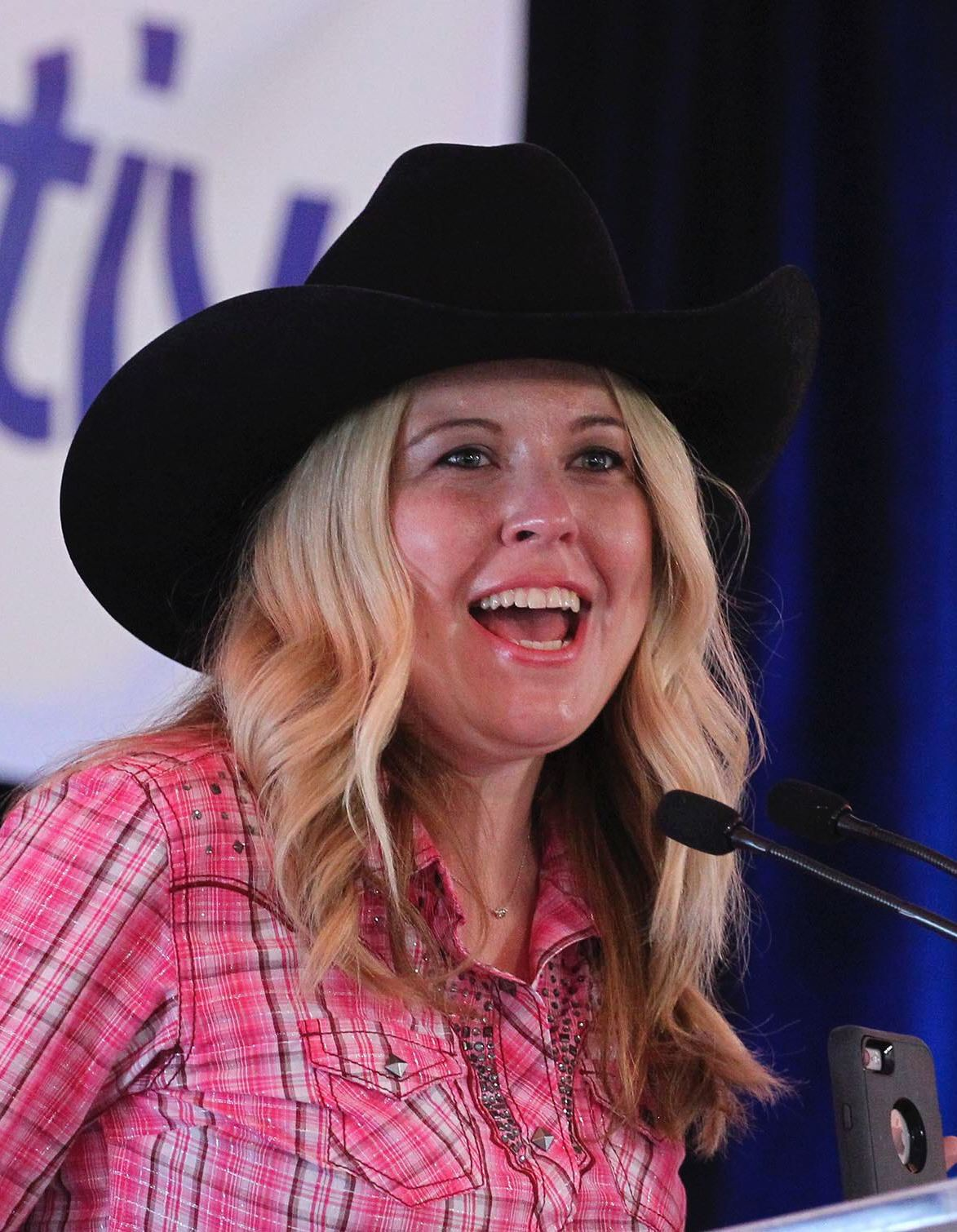
- Garner in 2017
Shadow cabinet portfolios
Shadow Minister for Natural Resources
In office November 9, 2021 – October 12, 2022
Leader	Erin O'Toole; Candice Bergen (interim); Pierre Poilievre
Shadowing	Jonathan Wilkinson
Preceded by	Greg McLean
Succeeded by	Shannon Stubbs
Shadow Minister for Health
In office September 8, 2020 – November 9, 2021
Leader	Erin O'Toole
Shadowing	Patty Hajdu
Preceded by	Matt Jeneroux
Succeeded by	Luc Berthold

Minister of Western Economic Diversification
- In office July 15, 2013 – November 4, 2015
- Prime Minister: Stephen Harper
- Preceded by: Lynne Yelich
- Succeeded by: Navdeep Bains

Member of Parliament for Calgary Nose Hill Calgary Centre-North (2011–2015)
- Incumbent
- Assumed office May 2, 2011
- Preceded by: Jim Prentice

Personal details
- Born: Michelle Marie Godin; February 14, 1980 (age 46) Winnipeg, Manitoba, Canada
- Party: Conservative
- Spouse: Jeffrey Garner (m. 2019)
- Education: University of Manitoba (BA)

Michelle Rempel Garner PC MP (née Godin; born February 14, 1980) is a Canadian politician who sits in the House of Commons as the member of Parliament (MP) for the Alberta riding of Calgary Nose Hill. A member of the Conservative Party, she was initially elected to represent Calgary Centre-North in the 2011 federal election, serving as Minister of Western Economic Diversification during Stephen Harper's premiership.

== Early life and career ==
Rempel Garner was born in Winnipeg, Manitoba. She is of partial Franco-Manitoban ancestry through her father. She completed a degree in economics at the University of Manitoba, and helped to pay her way through school by playing as a classically-trained pianist.

Prior to being elected, Rempel Garner worked as the director of the University of Calgary's Institutional Programs Division. She is credited with leading a redesign of the University's service delivery model which resulted in sponsored research funding revenues increasing from $7 million in 2007 to over $100 million in 2009. She had also previously worked in the technology commercialization division of the University of Manitoba.

== Federal politics ==
Rempel Garner became involved in federal politics by volunteering with the federal riding association of Diane Ablonczy, and she later served as president of the Conservative Party riding executive for her riding of Calgary—Nose Hill. After the resignation of Jim Prentice, Rempel was encouraged to run for his old seat of Calgary Centre-North by members of the Calgary business community and the Conservative party, but only decided to do so after talking with Rona Ambrose.

Rempel was acclaimed as the Conservative Party of Canada candidate in Calgary Centre-North on December 17, 2010, in anticipation of a by-election to replace Prentice. The uncalled by-election was superseded by the 2011 federal election. In the 2013 federal riding redistribution, Rempel Garner's riding was split into the two ridings of Calgary Confederation and Calgary Nose Hill. Since this redistribution, Rempel Garner has run as a Conservative in Calgary Nose Hill.

Following Rempel Garner's election to the House of Commons of Canada, she was appointed Parliamentary Secretary to the Minister of the Environment on May 25, 2011. She received positive media coverage in late 2011 for her strong performance during Question Period, and was seen as a rising star within the Conservative caucus. Rempel Garner played a role in the multi-partisan effort to create Sable Island National Park Reserve. On November 21, 2012, Canadian newsmagazine Maclean's named her as one of their "Parliamentarians of the Year" in the "Rising Star" category, which Rempel repeated on November 24, 2014. Rempel was recognized as the MP with the 7th biggest social media influence in November 2013. The 2013 Hill Times Annual Most Valuable Politician & All Politics Poll awarded Rempel 2nd place in the "Best Up-and-comer MP" category behind Justin Trudeau.

Along with three other Albertan politicians, Rempel Garner is a signatory of the Buffalo Declaration, which charges that "Alberta is not ... an equal participant in confederation" and likens the relationship between Alberta and the rest of Canada to "colony, rather than equal partner." Signatories have proposed structural and policy solutions to address these issues.

Rempel Garner has also been a vocal advocate for legal firearms ownership in Canada. In May 2020, Rempel Garner sponsored Parliamentary Petition E-2574, which aims to reverse the federal government's executive order that banned 1500 "assault style" weapons. This became the most signed e-petition in Canada's history at the time with over 230,000 signatures.

Rempel Garner was one of the co-chairs of the 2013 Conservative Party of Canada's national convention held in Calgary.

=== Minister of State for Western Economic Diversification ===
On July 15, 2013, she was appointed Minister of State for Western Economic Diversification. She was then the youngest female cabinet minister in Canadian history.

In this role, Rempel Garner aimed to improve the delivery and efficiency of the department's services by focusing its attention on commercializing technology in emerging sectors such as green energy. To this end, she oversaw a series of investments that aimed to "accelerate technology development and performance validation, as well as the commercialization of key instruments associated with the underground storage of carbon dioxide (CO2)." Such projects aim to further Canada's international climate change efforts and help keep the Canadian energy sector competitive. These investments have included WINN, a $100 million five-year initiative that offered repayable contributions for small and medium-sized enterprises with operations in Western Canada, especially in emerging sectors such as clean energy, as well as the Canada 150 Community Infrastructure program, which saw $150 million delivered to communities across Canada for critical and legacy infrastructure projects.

During her time as the Minister of State, Rempel Garner also highlighted the importance and growing international demand for British Columbia's wine industry with strategic investments for the industry in partnership with UBC Okanagan.

=== In opposition ===
On November 20, 2015, Rempel Garner was appointed the Official Opposition Critic for Immigration, Refugees and Citizenship. In this role, she was an advocate for human rights and advocated for the protection of ethnic minorities, including the Yazidis. In 2016, a motion put forward by Rempel Garner, which acknowledged the genocide of the Yazidis and called on the government to expedite the processing of Yazidi refugees coming to Canada, passed unanimously. Rempel Garner also sponsored Parliamentary Petition E-1310 during this time, which petitioned the government to explicitly condemn the practice of female genital mutilation in its guide for new citizens. Rempel Garner tabled a bill amending Canada's bestiality laws in December 2017, which stalled at first reading. Approximately a year later, a government bill addressing the same concerns was tabled by Justice Minister Jody Wilson-Raybould.

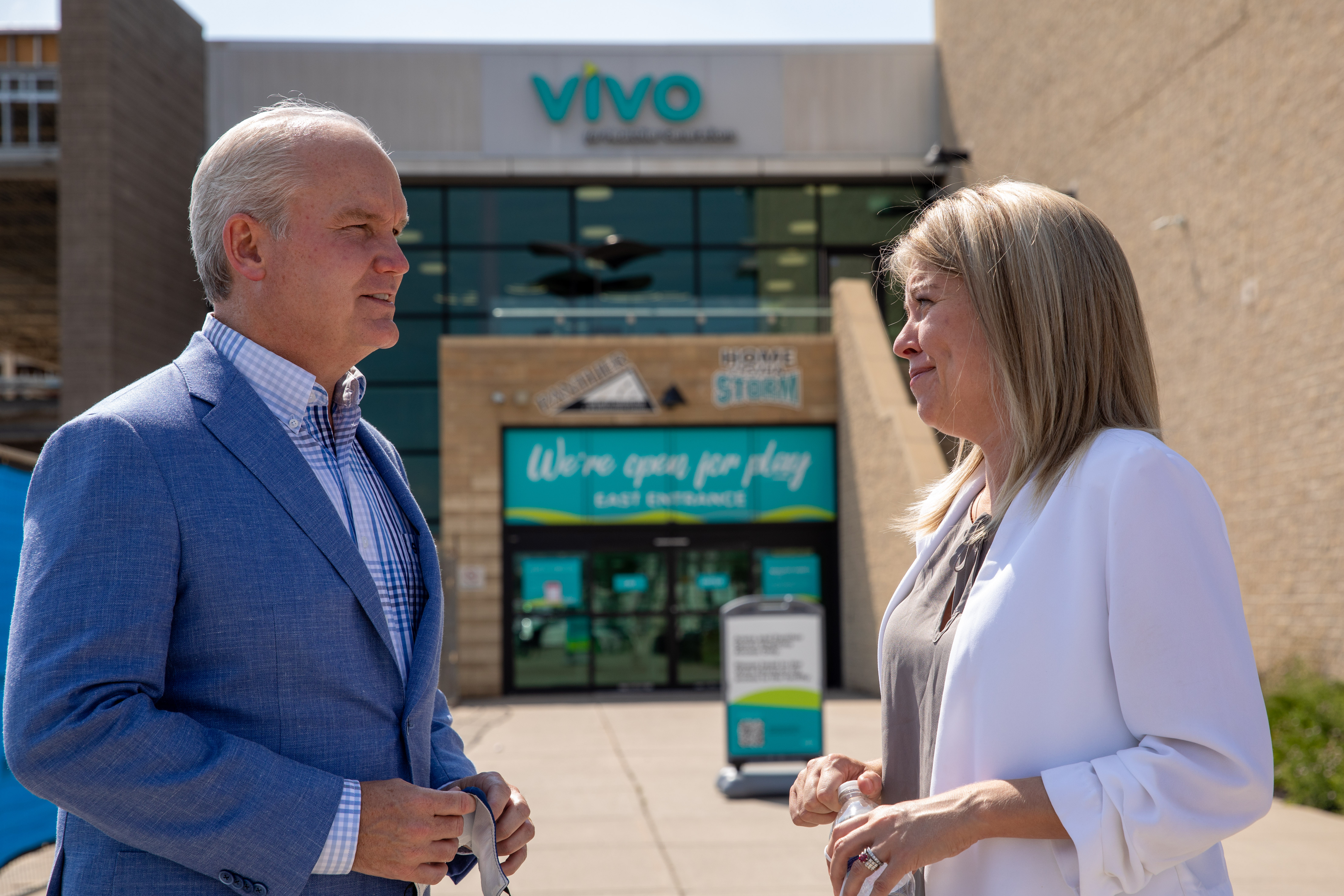
Rempel Garner with former Conservative Leader Erin O'Toole in July 2021

From November 2019, Rempel Garner served as Conservative Shadow Minister for Industry and Economic Development. In this role, she has advocated for policies that would compel companies to be more transparent on their data collection practices. With the onset of the COVID-19 pandemic, Rempel Garner called for greater oversight and transparency from the federal government on state-sponsored cell phone contact tracing applications, calling for express consent and strict limits on data collection.

As Critic for Innovation and Economic Development, Rempel Garner also supported potential legislative solutions to address the lack of reliable internet access in Canada, which is a barrier to equality of opportunity and economic growth for many Canadians. To this end, in May 2020, Rempel Garner launched the Conservative Party's ‘Connect Canada’ consultation initiative for action on rural internet access. The initiative delivered a report outlining policy proposals that would aim for all Canadians to have access to affordable and reliable internet by the year 2021.

In June 2020, Rempel Garner passed a motion with support from other opposition parties to have the Standing Committee on Industry, Science and Technology study the effects of foreign takeovers and the Investment Canada Act.

In September 2020, Rempel Garner was appointed Official Opposition health critic by Erin O'Toole. In this role she has been critical of the Liberal Party's COVID-19 vaccine rollout. She was appointed natural resources critic by O'Toole in November 2021.

In 2022, Rempel Garner wrote an article in favour of proportional representation during the debate on the 2022 Canadian federal electoral redistribution.

She was elected vice chair of the Canadian House of Commons Standing Committee on Citizenship and Immigration in the 45th Canadian Parliament in 2025.

== Controversies ==
In 2018, The Canadian Press ranked one of Rempel Garner's news releases as containing "a lot of baloney" on its "baloney meter", which it describes as "a project ... that examines the level of accuracy in statements made by politicians". This was in reference to claims that Canada was facing a "crisis" in regards to migrant accommodation. Rempel Garner responded to this allegation by alleging that the news organization was working as a "spin tool" for the Prime Minister's Office. It was later reported that the federal government has spent $1.1 billion on hotels for asylum seekers and other media reports later classified the situation as a "crisis."

The Sprawl criticized her response, arguing that it is part of a pattern whereby Rempel Garner "mimics the worst of American politics and attacks the media’s credibility" and opined that "her anti-media rants veered into full-on conspiracy theory."

In 2020, Rempel Garner was criticized for working from the U.S. state of Oklahoma as a sitting Canadian MP during the COVID-19 pandemic. Following news reports, Rempel Garner indicated she had left Canada for an "unexpected and urgent private personal matter". The National Post reported in August 2020 that since the pandemic began in March, "there has been no indication that the Conservative MP had returned to Canada."

Rempel Garner has been accused of blocking users on Twitter. The hashtag #BlockedByRempel trended on Twitter with replies from Canadians who alleged that they had been blocked by Rempel Garner. She claims to have been a victim of gendered social media abuse and to have received threats of violence in her role as a female Parliamentarian. Rempel Garner won a court case against a Toronto area man who threatened her with violence over social media. In 2018, APTN national news reported that Rempel blocked an Indigenous youth representative on Twitter, and the report asked whether "this move sets a 'dangerous precedent' for politicians facing criticism online." The Toronto Star revealed that "it only took Rempel about five minutes to block his Twitter account after he turned to social media to critique her stance on immigration." "It’s not the fact that she blocked me personally that’s upsetting me,” the deputy youth leader said. “It’s the fact that this is an elected member of Parliament. She’s a Canadian politician and she’s taking these kinds of steps to block out this kind of information from Canadian citizens.”

== Honours ==
In 2010, Rempel Garner was named one of Canada's Top 100 Most Powerful Women in the "Future Leaders" category by the Women's Executive Network.

In November 2014, Rempel was named one of Calgary's Top 40 Under 40 by Avenue magazine. In 2016, Rempel was selected as one of the World Economic Forum’s Young Global Leaders. Rempel Garner was named one of "Alberta's 50 Most Influential People of 2016" by Alberta Venture Magazine, citing her "strong debate performances in the House of Commons" and "her fierce support of women in politics".

In 2018, Rempel was ranked third on the list of "Most Valuable Politicians" by the Hill Times.

== Electoral record ==
2025 Canadian federal election: Calgary Nose Hill
Party	Candidate	Votes	%	±%	Expenditures
Conservative	Michelle Rempel Garner	36,597	59.42	+4.10	$119,895.42
Liberal	Tom Becker	22,276	36.17	+15.94	$22,074.09
New Democratic	Ahmed Khan	1,975	3.21	–13.71	$7,279.03
Green	Addison Fach	430	0.70	–0.92	$845.52
Rhinoceros	Vanessa Wang	199	0.32	–0.14	none listed
Marxist–Leninist	Margaret Peggy Askin	115	0.19	–0.02	none listed
Total valid votes/expense limit		61,592	99.52	–	$134,499.71
Total rejected ballots		298	0.48	–0.15	
Turnout		61,890	69.21	+8.13	
Eligible voters		89,425			
Conservative hold		Swing		–5.92	
Source: Elections Canada

2021 Canadian federal election: Calgary Nose Hill
Party	Candidate	Votes	%	±%	Expenditures
Conservative	Michelle Rempel Garner	28,001	55.57	–14.20	$104,242.34
Liberal	Jessica Dale-Walker	10,311	20.46	+4.72	$3,523.58
New Democratic	Khalis Ahmed	8,500	16.87	+7.28	none listed
People's	Kyle Scott	2,324	4.61	+2.64	$4,866.70
Green	Judson Hansell	636	1.26	–1.55	none listed
Rhinoceros	Vanessa Wang	285	0.57	–	none listed
Christian Heritage	Larry R. Heather	169	0.34	–	$4,063.95
Marxist–Leninist	Margaret Peggy Askin	105	0.21	+0.08	none listed
National Citizens Alliance	Stephen J. Garvey	62	0.12	–	none listed
Total valid votes/expense limit		50,393	99.37	–	$112,642.54
Total rejected ballots		321	0.63	+0.16	
Turnout		50,714	61.07	–5.56	
Eligible voters		83,037			
Conservative hold		Swing		–4.74	
Source: Elections Canada

2019 Canadian federal election: Calgary Nose Hill
Party	Candidate	Votes	%	±%	Expenditures
Conservative	Michelle Rempel Garner	38,588	69.77	+9.73	$102,518.98
Liberal	Josephine Tsang	8,703	15.74	–11.15	$13,026.69
New Democratic	Patrick King	5,304	9.59	+0.73	$7,442.59
Green	Jocelyn Grossé	1,554	2.81	+0.27	$1,915.19
People's	Kelly Lorencz	1,089	1.97	–	$21,407.32
Marxist–Leninist	Margaret Peggy Askin	71	0.13	–	none listed
Total valid votes/expense limit		55,309	99.53	–	$109,728.95
Total rejected ballots		262	0.47	+0.00	
Turnout		55,571	66.64	–0.01	
Eligible voters		83,395			
Conservative hold		Swing		+10.48	
Source: Elections Canada

2015 Canadian federal election: Calgary Nose Hill
Party	Candidate	Votes	%	±%	Expenditures
Conservative	Michelle Rempel Garner	32,760	60.04	–9.25	$106,493.93
Liberal	Robert Prcic	14,671	26.89	+15.84	$4,863.68
New Democratic	Bruce Kaufman	4,836	8.86	–3.92	$17,607.32
Green	Laurie Scheer	1,384	2.54	–4.21	$2,630.75
Libertarian	Edward Gao	727	1.33	–	$1,101.19
Democratic Advancement	Faizan Butt	184	0.34	–	none listed
Total valid votes/expense limit		54,562	99.53	–	$217,293.27
Total rejected ballots		255	0.47	+0.17	
Turnout		54,817	66.65	+10.01	
Eligible voters		82,243			
Conservative hold		Swing		–12.54	
Source: Elections Canada

2011 Canadian federal election: Calgary Centre-North
Party	Candidate	Votes	%	±%	Expenditures
Conservative	Michelle Rempel Garner	28,443	56.53	–0.01	$81,987.23
New Democratic	Paul Vargis	8,048	15.99	+0.67	$14,987.13
Liberal	Stephen Randall	7,046	14.00	+2.22	$55,715.23
Green	Heather MacIntosh	6,578	13.07	–2.20	$42,839.60
Marxist–Leninist	Margaret Peggy Askin	203	0.40	+0.02	none listed
Total valid votes/expense limit		50,318	99.60	–	$90,413.51
Total rejected ballots		200	0.40	+0.03	
Turnout		50,518	59.71	+3.42	
Eligible voters		84,609			
Conservative hold		Swing		–0.34	
Source: Elections Canada
