= Buffalo Declaration =

Political manifesto in Alberta, Canada

- Author: Michelle Rempel, Blake Richards, Glen Motz, Arnold Viersen
- Published: February 20, 2020
- Pages: 13
- Preceded by: Alberta Agenda
- Website: https://buffalodeclaration.com/

The Buffalo Declaration is a Canadian political manifesto published on February 20, 2020. The publication was written by four Albertan Conservative MPs: Michelle Rempel Garner, Blake Richards, Glen Motz and Arnold Viersen. They denounce the underappreciated place that Alberta holds within the Canadian confederation as well as the lack of consideration with regard to its policies, its economy and its culture. The authors declared that it was a "final attempt to make [Alberta] an equal partner in Confederation," and the alternative will be that "a referendum on Alberta’s independence is an inevitability."

When the declaration was released, Rempel declared that "Alberta is not, and never has been, an equal partner in Confederation. The people of my province are suffering and need real, structural change. A line in the sand must be drawn." The declaration faced mixed reaction.

== Background ==
Following the 2019 Canadian federal election, the Liberal Party led by Justin Trudeau was locked out of Western Canada, with the party not winning a single seat in Alberta or Saskatchewan. On social media, #WEXIT trended #1 on Twitter, and pro-independence Facebook groups rapidly grew in size. Many commentators would tie the election results to a growing sense of western alienation under the Trudeau government.

In the start of 2020, rail blockades led to a shutdown of passenger rail service and rail freight operations in much of Canada.

== The Declaration ==
The declaration derives its name from the early 1900s, when Sir Frederick Haultain, the first premier of the Northwest Territories, proposed for a new Canadian province that comprised what is now Alberta and Saskatchewan. The proposed province would have been named "Buffalo," but the proposal was ultimately rejected by Prime Minister Wilfrid Laurier.

It lays out a number of complaints, including that Alberta is not, and has never been, an equal participant in Confederation, Alberta is a culturally distinct region, but this has not been recognized, Alberta is physically and structurally isolated from Canada's economic and political power structures, and Alberta is treated as a colony, rather than an equal partner in Confederation.

The declaration calls for a number of changes including that Parliament recognize Alberta is not an equal partner in Confederation, Canada balance representation in Parliament to ensure unique regional interests, like those in Alberta, are safeguarded, recognize Alberta – or Buffalo - as a culturally distinct region within Confederation, acknowledge, in the House of Commons, the devastation the National Energy Program caused to the people of Alberta, an immediate change to the Equalization program, constitutionally entrench resource projects as the sole domain of the provinces, enable the province to also collect federal taxes and remit the federal share to Ottawa, enact structural change within Canada's federal government to ensure all regions have a voice within its political and justice system, among others.

It also wanted the federal government to promote Alberta's energy sector, and create a plan to protect the integrity and essential services provided by Canadian infrastructure, like rail, pipelines, and highways.

== Reaction ==
In an editorial, the Toronto Sun said, "whatever you think of the particulars in the declaration, it’s important to listen to these concerns," and that "Prime Minister Justin Trudeau has made the West feel more alienated than ever." The Lethbridge Herald echoed the sentiments writing, "Albertans have had enough, and the so-called “Wexit” movement and now the Buffalo Declaration are of symptoms of that frustration," going on to say that Western Alienation is "at a high level now, and if the federal government wants to ensure co-operation from Alberta in keeping Canada strong and healthy, it would be wise to listen to the concerns."

John Ibbitson noted in The Globe and Mail that, "the analysis is rooted in truth, but the implied threat – redress or separation – is a dead end. Separation is no solution for Alberta." Ken Boessenkool, author of the “firewall letter” said it was “appropriate” that these ideas come up during the leadership race for the Conservative party. "I view them as part of an internal discussion within the Conservative Party about the relative strength and influence of the West in the Conservative coalition," he said on social media. He went on to say that the manifesto arose "from a sincere and real feeling of alienation. Western feelings of alienation are real. Separatist sentiment is also real, but dangerous."

Former Saskatchewan Premier Brad Wall praised the declaration on social media saying, "there needs to be national attention to and action on the abiding unfairness in the confederation toward Alberta, Saskatchewan, and the west in general. You and your colleagues deserve credit for this Michelle [Rempel-Garner]."

=== Criticism ===
Murray Mandryk, a columnist for the Regina Leader-Post, said "rather than solutions or vision, [the declaration is] an outpouring of clumsy grievances borrowed from others — what conservatives once called 'whining,'" and was "another knife plunge into the heart of nation founded on reasoned compromise." Colby Cosh mocked the declaration in the National Post writing, "the main task is to train the Buffalo audience in an unfamiliar and unnatural argot of victimhood, one in which injustices are always 'systemic' and change must always be 'structural' and you get a failing grade if you go a hundred words without mentioning undifferentiated 'power.' If you feel 'disrespected,' as we Albertans surely often do, you should immediately take that to be evidence of a conspiracy against your ambitions."

Conservative MP for Calgary Midnapore Stephanie Kusie told the Hill Times after the declaration was released that while she supported most of the sentiments of the declaration, she it was "completely disingenuous to the Alberta caucus" for the authors to have written the declaration without the backing or consultation of other Alberta MPs. Former Alberta Premier Rachel Notley condemned the declaration saying in a statement, "at the end of the day, as a born and raised Albertan, I love this province. I will not have my values mistakenly described by extremist MPs in the conservative party."
