= Calgary Nose Hill =

Federal electoral district in Alberta, Canada

Coordinates: 51.113°N 114.160°W

Alberta electoral district
- Interactive map of riding boundaries from the 2025 federal election

Federal electoral district
- Legislature: House of Commons
MP
Michelle Rempel Garner
Conservative
- District created: 1996
- First contested: 1997
- Last contested: 2021
- District webpage: profile, map

Demographics
- Population (2011): 109,286
- Electors (2019): 83,064
- Area (km²): 57
- Pop. density (per km²): 1,917.3
- Census division: Division No. 6
- Census subdivision: Calgary (part)

Calgary Nose Hill (formerly Calgary—Nose Hill) is a federal electoral district in Alberta, Canada, that has been represented in the House of Commons of Canada since 1997.

== Geography ==
It consists of the part of the City of Calgary clockwise within the following line: from the northern limit of the city along: Centre Street North, Harvest Hills Boulevard North, Beddington Trail NW, Deerfoot Trail, McKnight Boulevard, John Laurie Boulevard NW, Sarcee Trail, Stoney Trail, 14 Street north to the northern limit of the city.

== Demographics ==
According to the 2011 Canadian census

Languages: 78.0% English, 12.9% Chinese, 1.0% Punjabi, 1.0% Spanish, 7.1% Other
Religions: 52.2% Christian, 4.9% Muslim, 3.3% Buddhist, 1.9% Hindu, 1.4% Sikh, 0.6% Other, 35.7% None
Median income: $37,048 (2010)
Average income: $51,586 (2010)

Panethnic groups in Calgary Nose Hill (2011−2021)
Panethnic group	2021		2016		2011	
Panethnic group	Pop.	%	Pop.	%	Pop.	%
European (Note: Statistic includes all persons that did not make up part of a visible minority or an indigenous identity.)	52,165	45.33%	58,545	50.66%	62,285	57.1%
East Asian (Note: Statistic includes total responses of "Chinese", "Korean", and "Japanese" under visible minority section on census.)	25,000	21.72%	25,875	22.39%	22,890	20.98%
South Asian	10,615	9.22%	9,695	8.39%	7,625	6.99%
African	7,535	6.55%	5,190	4.49%	3,010	2.76%
Southeast Asian (Note: Statistic includes total responses of "Filipino" and "Southeast Asian" under visible minority section on census.)	7,335	6.37%	6,115	5.29%	5,395	4.95%
Middle Eastern (Note: Statistic includes total responses of "West Asian" and "Arab" under visible minority section on census.)	4,050	3.52%	3,305	2.86%	2,350	2.15%
Indigenous	3,285	2.85%	2,685	2.32%	2,790	2.56%
Latin American	2,620	2.28%	2,290	1.98%	1,425	1.31%
Other/Multiracial (Note: Statistic includes total responses of "Visible minority, n.i.e." and "Multiple visible minorities" under visible minority section on census.)	2,490	2.16%	1,855	1.61%	1,300	1.19%
Total responses	115,080	99.82%	115,560	99.8%	109,080	99.81%
Total population	115,287	100%	115,795	100%	109,286	100%
Notes: Totals greater than 100% due to multiple origin responses. Demographics based on 2012 Canadian federal electoral redistribution riding boundaries.

== History ==
This riding was created in 1996 from Calgary North and Wild Rose ridings.

In 2003, parts of this electoral district were transferred to Calgary Centre-North riding.

In the 2012 federal electoral boundaries redistribution Calgary—Nose Hill lost the emdash in its name. It also lost all of its territory north of Stoney Trail and west of Sarcee Trail and John Laurie Blvd to the new riding of Calgary Rocky Ridge, while gaining back the area north of a line following John Laurie Blvd to McKnight Blvd from Calgary Centre-North. This was legally defined in the 2013 representation order and came into effect upon the call of the October 19, 2015 42nd Canadian federal election.

=== Historical boundaries ===
1996 representation order

2003 representation order

2013 representation order

=== Members of Parliament ===
This riding has elected the following members of Parliament:

Parliament	Years	Member	Party
Calgary—Nose Hill; Riding created from Calgary North and Wild Rose
36th	1997–2000 (Note: The Reform Party merged with the Canadian Alliance on 27 March 2000.)	Diane Ablonczy	Reform
36th	2000–2000	Diane Ablonczy	Alliance
37th	2000–2003 (Note: The Canadian Alliance merged with the Progressive Conservatives to form the Conservative Party on 8 December 2003.)	Diane Ablonczy	Alliance
37th	2003–2004	Diane Ablonczy	Conservative
38th	2004–2006	Diane Ablonczy	Conservative
39th	2006–2008	Diane Ablonczy	Conservative
40th	2008–2011	Diane Ablonczy	Conservative
41st	2011–2015	Diane Ablonczy	Conservative
Calgary Nose Hill
42nd	2015–2019	Michelle Rempel Garner	Conservative
43rd	2019–2021	Michelle Rempel Garner	Conservative
44th	2021–2025	Michelle Rempel Garner	Conservative
45th	2025–present	Michelle Rempel Garner	Conservative

== Election results ==
Graph of election results in Calgary—Nose Hill, Calgary Nose Hill (minor parties that never got 2% of the vote or didn't run consistently are omitted)

=== Calgary Nose Hill (2013–present) ===
Graph of election results in Calgary Nose Hill (minor parties that never got 2% of the vote or didn't run consistently are omitted)

2025 Canadian federal election
Party	Candidate	Votes	%	±%	Expenditures
Conservative	Michelle Rempel Garner	36,597	59.42	+4.10	$119,895.42
Liberal	Tom Becker	22,276	36.17	+15.94	$22,074.09
New Democratic	Ahmed Khan	1,975	3.21	–13.71	$7,279.03
Green	Addison Fach	430	0.70	–0.92	$845.52
Rhinoceros	Vanessa Wang	199	0.32	–0.14	none listed
Marxist–Leninist	Margaret Peggy Askin	115	0.19	–0.02	none listed
Total valid votes/expense limit		61,592	99.52	–	$134,499.71
Total rejected ballots		298	0.48	–0.15	
Turnout		61,890	69.21	+8.13	
Eligible voters		89,425			
Conservative hold		Swing		–5.92	
Source: Elections Canada

2021 federal election redistributed results
Party	Vote	%
Conservative	29,989	55.32
Liberal	10,966	20.23
New Democratic	9,170	16.92
People's	2,600	4.80
Green	877	1.62
Others	606	1.12

2021 Canadian federal election
Party	Candidate	Votes	%	±%	Expenditures
Conservative	Michelle Rempel Garner	28,001	55.57	–14.20	$104,242.34
Liberal	Jessica Dale-Walker	10,311	20.46	+4.72	$3,523.58
New Democratic	Khalis Ahmed	8,500	16.87	+7.28	none listed
People's	Kyle Scott	2,324	4.61	+2.64	$4,866.70
Green	Judson Hansell	636	1.26	–1.55	none listed
Rhinoceros	Vanessa Wang	285	0.57	–	none listed
Christian Heritage	Larry R. Heather	169	0.34	–	$4,063.95
Marxist–Leninist	Margaret Peggy Askin	105	0.21	+0.08	none listed
National Citizens Alliance	Stephen J. Garvey	62	0.12	–	none listed
Total valid votes/expense limit		50,393	99.37	–	$112,642.54
Total rejected ballots		321	0.63	+0.16	
Turnout		50,714	61.07	–5.56	
Eligible voters		83,037			
Conservative hold		Swing		–4.74	
Source: Elections Canada

2019 Canadian federal election
Party	Candidate	Votes	%	±%	Expenditures
Conservative	Michelle Rempel Garner	38,588	69.77	+9.73	$102,518.98
Liberal	Josephine Tsang	8,703	15.74	–11.15	$13,026.69
New Democratic	Patrick King	5,304	9.59	+0.73	$7,442.59
Green	Jocelyn Grossé	1,554	2.81	+0.27	$1,915.19
People's	Kelly Lorencz	1,089	1.97	–	$21,407.32
Marxist–Leninist	Margaret Peggy Askin	71	0.13	–	none listed
Total valid votes/expense limit		55,309	99.53	–	$109,728.95
Total rejected ballots		262	0.47	+0.00	
Turnout		55,571	66.64	–0.01	
Eligible voters		83,395			
Conservative hold		Swing		+10.48	
Source: Elections Canada

2015 Canadian federal election
Party	Candidate	Votes	%	±%	Expenditures
Conservative	Michelle Rempel Garner	32,760	60.04	–9.25	$106,493.93
Liberal	Robert Prcic	14,671	26.89	+15.84	$4,863.68
New Democratic	Bruce Kaufman	4,836	8.86	–3.92	$17,607.32
Green	Laurie Scheer	1,384	2.54	–4.21	$2,630.75
Libertarian	Edward Gao	727	1.33	–	$1,101.19
Democratic Advancement	Faizan Butt	184	0.34	–	none listed
Total valid votes/expense limit		54,562	99.53	–	$217,293.27
Total rejected ballots		255	0.47	+0.17	
Turnout		54,817	66.65	+10.01	
Eligible voters		82,243			
Conservative hold		Swing		–12.54	
Source: Elections Canada

=== Calgary—Nose Hill (1996–2013) ===
Graph of election results in Calgary—Nose Hill (minor parties that never got 2% of the vote or didn't run consistently are omitted)

2011 Canadian federal election: Calgary—Nose Hill
Party	Candidate	Votes	%	±%	Expenditures
Conservative	Diane Ablonczy	40,384	70.17	+0.55	$63,917.43
New Democratic	Colin Anderson	7,189	12.49	+4.66	none listed
Liberal	Margaret McLeod	6,501	11.30	–1.93	$33,697.01
Green	Tony Hajj	3,480	6.05	–3.26	$10,363.14
Total valid votes/expense limit		57,554	99.71	–	$101,293.01
Total rejected ballots		169	0.29	–0.05	
Turnout		57,723	56.64	+2.78	
Eligible voters		101,910			
Conservative hold		Swing		+2.61	
Source: Elections Canada

2008 Canadian federal election: Calgary—Nose Hill
Party	Candidate	Votes	%	±%	Expenditures
Conservative	Diane Ablonczy	35,029	69.62	+1.13	$52,910.69
Liberal	Anoush Newman	6,657	13.23	–3.87	$9,596.78
Green	Tony Hajj	4,685	9.31	+2.84	$6,944.85
New Democratic	Stephanie Sundberg	3,941	7.83	–0.11	$852.80
Total valid votes/expense limit		50,312	99.66	–	$93,719.48
Total rejected ballots		171	0.34	+0.11	
Turnout		50,483	53.86	–9.97	
Eligible voters		93,731			
Conservative hold		Swing		+2.50	
Source: Elections Canada

2006 Canadian federal election: Calgary—Nose Hill
Party	Candidate	Votes	%	±%	Expenditures
Conservative	Diane Ablonczy	37,815	68.49	+4.11	$54,492.37
Liberal	Ted Haney	9,443	17.10	–5.79	$58,069.61
New Democratic	Bruce Kaufman	4,385	7.94	+1.21	$6,417.76
Green	Juliet Burgess	3,573	6.47	+0.47	$606.00
Total valid votes/expense limit		55,216	99.77	–	$84,215.26
Total rejected ballots		130	0.23	–0.04	
Turnout		55,346	63.83	+2.62	
Eligible voters		86,703			
Conservative hold		Swing		+4.95	
Source: Elections Canada

2004 Canadian federal election: Calgary—Nose Hill
Party	Candidate	Votes	%	±%	Expenditures
Conservative	Diane Ablonczy	31,088	64.38	–10.31	$55,831.57
Liberal	Ted Haney	11,051	22.89	+3.46	$47,683.77
New Democratic	Vinay Dey	3,250	6.73	+3.01	$4,146.21
Green	Richard Larson	2,898	6.00	+4.17	$570.98
Total valid votes/expense limit		48,287	99.73	–	$77,488.62
Total rejected ballots		131	0.27	+0.06	
Turnout		48,418	61.21	+1.70	
Eligible voters		79,095			
Conservative notional gain		Swing		–6.89	
Source: Elections Canada

2000 Canadian federal election: Calgary—Nose Hill
Party	Candidate	Votes	%	±%	Expenditures
Alliance	Diane Ablonczy	35,904	60.13	+8.33	$59,338
Liberal	Brian Thiessen	11,602	19.43	–5.81	$20,306
Progressive Conservative	James F. Mcardle	8,696	14.56	–2.86	$5,320
New Democratic	Jon Adams	2,227	3.73	–0.05	$893
Green	Andrew Pickles	1,092	1.83	+0.55	$2,410
Canadian Action	Maureen Ann Roberts	194	0.32	–	$2,411
Total valid votes		59,715	99.79		
Total rejected ballots		123	0.21	+0.01	
Turnout		59,838	59.51	–5.37	
Eligible voters		100,544			
Alliance notional hold		Swing		+7.07	
Source: Elections Canada

1997 Canadian federal election: Calgary—Nose Hill
Party	Candidate	Votes	%	±%	Expenditures
Reform	Diane Ablonczy	25,788	51.80	–	$64,740
Liberal	James Maxim	12,565	25.24	–	$47,359
Progressive Conservative	Pat Murray	8,678	17.43	–	$53,211
New Democratic	Andrea Garnier	1,883	3.78	–	$1,278
Green	Frank Young	637	1.28	–	$1,631
Natural Law	Gloria Hansen	237	0.48	–	$103
Total valid votes		49,788	99.80		
Total rejected ballots		102	0.20	–	
Turnout		49,890	64.88	–	
Eligible voters		76,891			
Reform notional hold		Swing		N/A	
Source: Elections Canada

== Adjacent ridings ==
- Calgary Centre-North
- Calgary Northeast
- Calgary West
- Wild Rose

== See also ==
- List of Canadian electoral districts
- Historical federal electoral districts of Canada
