= Calgary Centre-North =

Former federal electoral district in Alberta, Canada

Coordinates: 51.07°N 114.08°W

Alberta electoral district
- Calgary Centre-North in relation to the other Calgary ridings

Defunct federal electoral district
- Legislature: House of Commons
- District created: 2003
- District abolished: 2013
- First contested: 2004
- Last contested: 2011
- District webpage: profile, map

Demographics
- Population (2011): 114,784
- Electors (2011): 83,832
- Area (km²): 48.05
- Census division: Division No. 6
- Census subdivision: Calgary

Calgary Centre-North (formerly known as Calgary North Centre) was a federal electoral district in Alberta, Canada, that was represented in the House of Commons of Canada from 2004 to 2015. It was a mixed urban and suburban constituency in Calgary – with a dense urban area close to the Bow River in the south and suburbs in the north of the riding, west of Deerfoot Trail and east of Nose Hill Park.

== History ==
This riding was created as "Calgary North Centre" in 2003 from Calgary Centre (38%), Calgary—Nose Hill (38%) and Calgary Northeast (24%).

In 2004, it was renamed "Calgary Centre-North". In 2013, it was abolished and redistributed into Calgary Confederation (67%) and Calgary Nose Hill (33%) ridings.

=== Members of Parliament ===
This riding has elected the following members of the House of Commons of Canada:

Calgary North Centre
Parliament	Years	Member	Party
Riding created from Calgary Centre, Calgary Northeast and Calgary—Nose Hill
38th	2004–2006	Jim Prentice	Conservative
Calgary Centre-North
39th	2006–2008	Jim Prentice	Conservative
40th	2008–2010	Jim Prentice	Conservative
41st	2011–2015	Michelle Rempel	Conservative
Riding dissolved into Calgary Confederation and Calgary Nose Hill

== Election results ==
=== Calgary Centre-North ===
2011 Canadian federal election
Party	Candidate	Votes	%	±%	Expenditures
Conservative	Michelle Rempel Garner	28,443	56.53	–0.01	$81,987.23
New Democratic	Paul Vargis	8,048	15.99	+0.67	$14,987.13
Liberal	Stephen Randall	7,046	14.00	+2.22	$55,715.23
Green	Heather MacIntosh	6,578	13.07	–2.20	$42,839.60
Marxist–Leninist	Margaret Peggy Askin	203	0.40	+0.02	none listed
Total valid votes/expense limit		50,318	99.60	–	$90,413.51
Total rejected ballots		200	0.40	+0.03	
Turnout		50,518	59.71	+3.42	
Eligible voters		84,609			
Conservative hold		Swing		–0.34	
Source: Elections Canada

2008 Canadian federal election
Party	Candidate	Votes	%	±%	Expenditures
Conservative	Jim Prentice	27,361	56.54	+0.54	$69,415.18
New Democratic	John Chan	7,413	15.32	–1.46	$24,843.71
Green	Eric Donovan	7,392	15.27	+3.46	$19,802.30
Liberal	Doug James	5,699	11.78	–1.92	$12,025.64
Libertarian	Jason E. McNeil	345	0.71	–	$3,354.62
Marxist–Leninist	Margaret Peggy Askin	184	0.38	+0.03	none listed
Total valid votes/expense limit		48,394	99.64	–	$88,581.95
Total rejected ballots		177	0.36	–0.02	
Turnout		48,571	56.29	–7.51	
Eligible voters		86,287			
Conservative hold		Swing		–0.46	
Source: Library of Parliament

2006 Canadian federal election
Party	Candidate	Votes	%	±%	Expenditures
Conservative	Jim Prentice	31,174	56.00	+1.81	$68,692.06
New Democratic	John Chan	9,341	16.78	+4.65	$20,639.09
Liberal	Matthew Moody	7,628	13.70	–7.66	$15,651.89
Green	Mark MacGillivray	6,573	11.81	+0.57	$7,133.24
Independent	Michael Falconar	383	0.69	–0.04	$1,118.01
First Peoples National	Doug Dokis	206	0.37	–	$717.70
Marxist–Leninist	Margaret Peggy Askin	194	0.35	+0.00	$60.00
Canadian Action	James Kohut	168	0.30	–	none listed
Total valid votes/expense limit		55,667	99.62	–	$84,783.07
Total rejected ballots		213	0.38	+0.02	
Turnout		55,880	63.80	+2.83	
Eligible voters		87,581			
Conservative hold		Swing		+3.23	
Source: Library of Parliament

=== Calgary North Centre ===
2004 Canadian federal election: Calgary North Centre
Party	Candidate	Votes	%	±%	Expenditures
Conservative	Jim Prentice	28,143	54.19	–	$54,480.31
Liberal	Cathy McClusky	11,093	21.36	–	$43,209.00
New Democratic	John Chan	6,298	12.13	–	$15,356.72
Green	Mark MacGillivray	5,840	11.24	–	$4,032.78
Independent	Michael Falconar	380	0.73	–	$3,176.06
Marxist–Leninist	Margaret Peggy Askin	184	0.35	–	none listed
Total valid votes/expense limit		51,938	99.64	–	$81,240.04
Total rejected ballots		188	0.36	–	
Turnout		52,126	60.97	–	
Eligible voters		85,490			
Conservative gain from		Swing		N/A	
Source: Elections Canada

== See also ==
- List of Canadian electoral districts
- Historical federal electoral districts of Canada
