= The Sprawl =

News outlet in Calgary, Alberta

- Website type: News website
- Available in: English
- Founder: Jeremy Klaszus
- Website: sprawlcalgary.com
- Launched: September 2017

The Sprawl is an independent online news outlet based in Calgary, Alberta, Canada. It was launched in 2017 by journalist Jeremy Klaszus as a temporary pop-up outlet covering the 2017 Calgary municipal election, but has since expanded to regularly cover Calgary news and politics.

Sprawlcast, a collaboration between The Sprawl and University of Calgary student radio station CJSW 90.9 FM, is broadcast as both a podcast and radio show, with new episodes uploaded once or twice a month.

The Sprawl is a founding member of Press Forward, a Canadian association of independent media publications. It's also a partner publisher in the Indiegraf news startup network.

== History ==
The Sprawl launched on Facebook, Twitter, and digital publishing platform Medium on Sept. 18, 2017 as a "pop-up journalism" project covering the 2017 Calgary municipal election. Founder Jeremy Klaszus wrote in an introductory article that he created The Sprawl not to publish in perpetuity, but to "be set up and taken down at specific times, tied to specific themes or events."

The Sprawl's first iteration concluded in October 2017, after which Klaszus decided to focus on building the publication and preparing for a second edition. On Nov. 21, 2017, The Sprawl announced its second edition would focus on the Calgary municipal budget debate.

In April 2018, The Sprawl was one of five media startups selected for the inaugural Digital News Innovation Challenge—a program run by Facebook, the DMZ, and the Ryerson University School of Journalism (now Toronto Metropolitan University). Participating startups received $100,000, as well as $50,000 in Facebook marketing. Klaszus used the funding to launch The Sprawl's website and to begin paying contributors for articles and illustrations.

In May 2019, The Sprawl was recognized for general excellence in digital publishing in the small division at the 2019 Digital Publishing Awards. Judges said the outlet was "refreshing" and its website provided a "satisfying mobile experience and smart audio."

The Sprawl continued to operate with Klaszus as its sole employee until September 2020, when the outlet hired assistant editor Ximena González. In November of the same year, membership editor Miranda Martini and municipal politics reporter Jeremy Appel were also hired. The Sprawl also experienced a membership boom in 2020—In an interview with Press Progress, Klaszus said the outlet's membership base "nearly doubled" in the first ten months of the year, citing a renewed interest in local media during the COVID-19 pandemic.

In July 2021, Klaszus told This Magazine that The Sprawl was continuing to grow in size and funding, and would be expanding to cover Edmonton politics as well. However, on Sept. 4, 2021, Klaszus announced monthly costs had surpassed membership revenue, and he "couldn’t see [The Sprawl] lasting another year, never mind four" without making "some painful decisions". The Sprawl ceased its Edmonton coverage, and Klaszus laid off the outlet's two employees and did not renew two regular contributors' contracts.

The Sprawl was nominated for seven Alberta Magazine Awards in April 2022.

== Funding ==
The Sprawl relies on crowdfunding as a regular source of income, using crowdfunding website Patreon and integrated software Neon One for reader memberships. As of July 2022, The Sprawl earns $1,563 per month from its Patreon subscribers.

The online outlet has regularly received grant funding from the Meta Journalism Project — The Sprawl received $100,000 from the company in 2018 and reportedly received an additional $142,000 in 2020 and $39,000 in 2021. The Sprawl also reported receiving $30,000 from the Canada Periodical Fund in 2020.
