= David Goatley (artist) =

Canadian portrait painter

David Goatley (born 1954) is a Canadian portrait painter.

Goatley was born in London and studied at the Camberwell School of Art. He emigrated to Canada in 1992 and settled in Victoria, British Columbia. He has painted the official portraits of a number of politicians including Kim Campbell (2004), Jim Prentice (2019), and Rachel Notley (2022).

Goatley is a Signature Member of the Portrait Society of America and the Federation of Canadian Artists.
