= Mayoralty of Naheed Nenshi =

2010–2021 mayoralty in Calgary, Canada

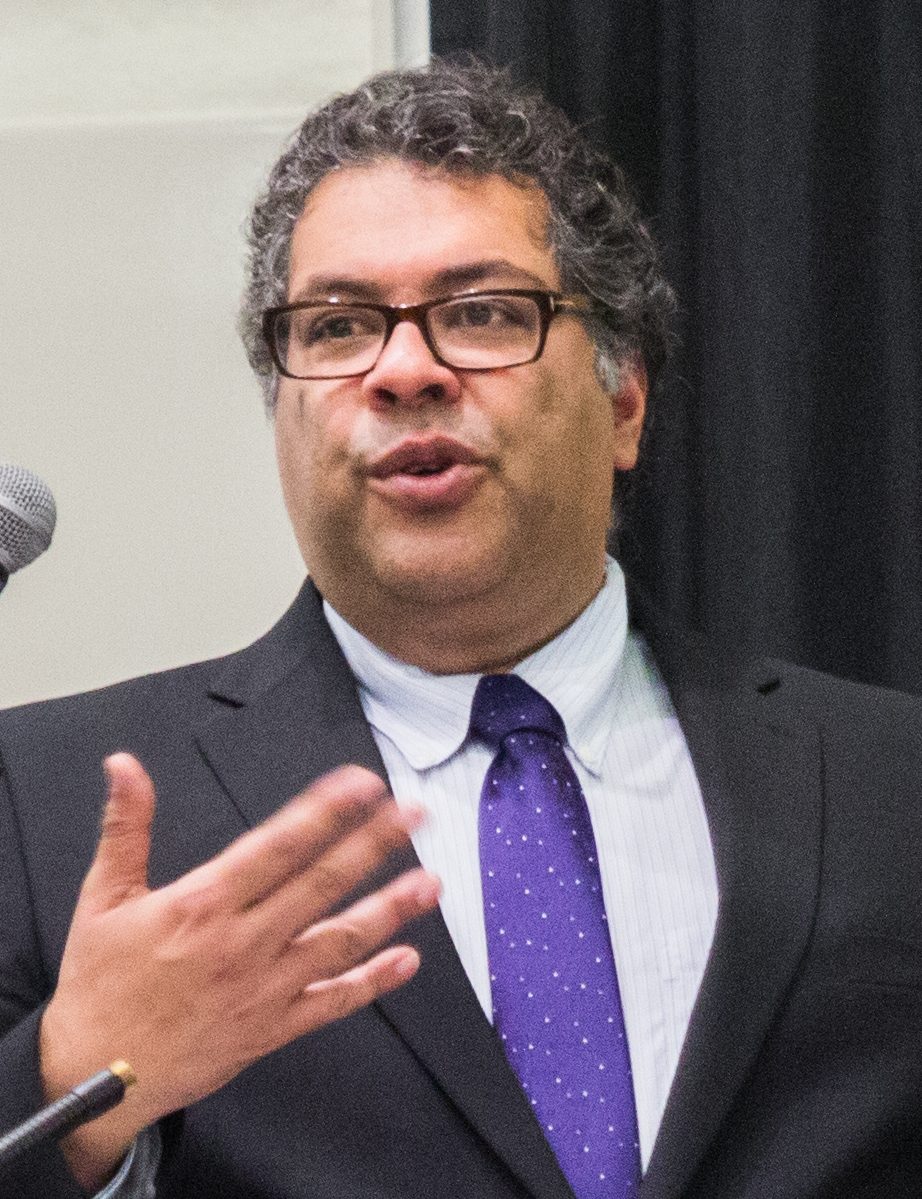
- Nenshi in 2015
- Mayoralty of Naheed Nenshi; October 25, 2010 – October 25, 2021
- Mayor: Naheed Nenshi
- Party: Independent
- Election: 2010; 2013; 2017
- Seat: Calgary Municipal Building

Naheed Nenshi served as mayor of Calgary, Alberta, Canada, from 2010 through 2021. He did not seek re-election in 2021 and was succeeded by Jyoti Gondek.

Nenshi was awarded the World Mayor prize in 2014 by the City Mayors Foundation. He became the first Canadian mayor to win this award.

Nenshi giving a campaign speech in July 2010

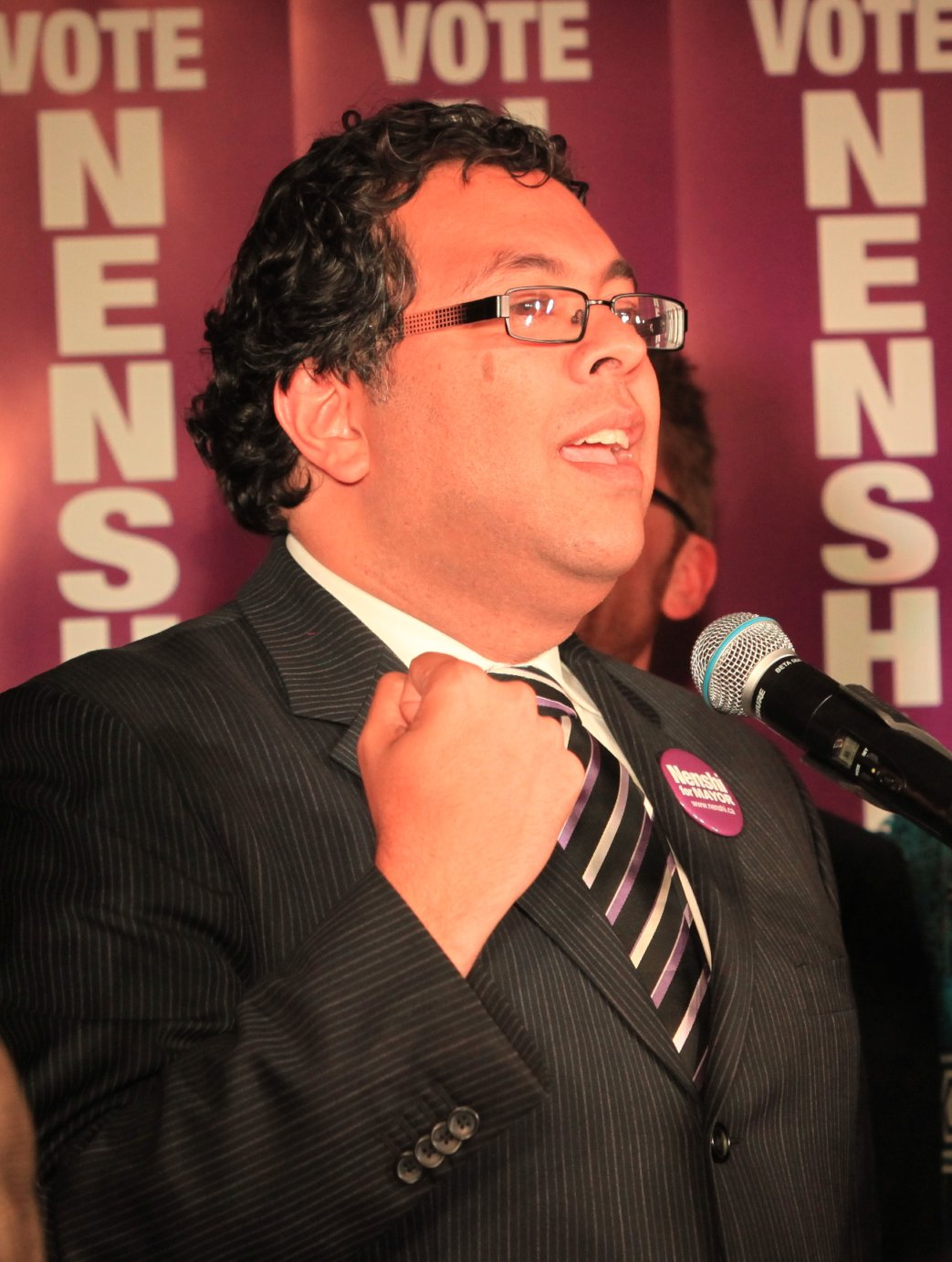
Nenshi speaking to supporters and media shortly after being projected to win

== Elections ==
=== 2010 mayoral election ===
Nenshi first ventured into politics in 2004, running unsuccessfully for a seat on Calgary's city council. His 2010 campaign for mayor, dubbed the "Purple Revolution", was uniquely a viral campaign which relied heavily on using social media to promote his platform and hyper-engage voters. According to Nenshi's campaign I.T. specialist Richard Einarson, the name "Purple Revolution" was chosen because the campaign wanted broad appeal across the socio-economic spectrum of liberal red and conservative blue voters.

Beside viral campaigning, the volunteer body of "Team Nenshi" were given a great degree of autonomy to exercise creative talent. The team promoted the cause through creative guerrilla marketing tactics such as "Operation Purple Dawn". Nenshi's supporters converged on the city in a mass rally on the evening before election day. They advertised Nenshi by posting signs and writing platform slogans with chalk graffiti on pavement of high traffic locations. Supporters offered their homes as venues for coffee parties where Nenshi spoke to the gathered about his platform. The coffee parties offered a friendly atmosphere for friends to discuss the volatile nature of sensitive political issues without risking their relationships. About 40 parties were held during the campaign.

A late September poll showed that his campaign was generating interest as he sat third with eight per cent support, although well behind the leaders, alderman Ric McIver (42%) and local media personality Barb Higgins (28%). His growing popularity led to greater scrutiny of his views, including a public dispute with Calgary Police Service chief Rick Hanson over the cost of policing the city.

Days before the election, a Calgary Herald poll showed that Nenshi's grassroots campaign continued to gain momentum as he had 30 per cent support among decided voters, placing him in a statistical tie with McIver and Higgins. He polled the strongest amongst younger voters, believed to be the result of his social media campaign. Nenshi's surge in popularity carried through to the election, when he earned 40 per cent of the vote, finishing nearly 28,000 votes ahead of second-placed McIver.

Being a Shia Ismaili, Nenshi became the first Muslim to become mayor of a major Canadian city. His win was viewed as a breakthrough for the use of social media as an election tool, and when considered with his faith and background, made international headlines. His election is seen as major signal of the shift in Albertan politics and the demography of Calgary. He engaged voters with a mutual two-way dialogue as "politics in full sentences".

==== Vandalism and email attacks ====
On September 11, 2010, 20 of Nenshi's campaign advertisements in the city were vandalized or destroyed and a brick was thrown through one of his campaign office's windows. The attacks, which commemorated the ninth anniversary of the September 11 attacks in New York City, were accompanied by a series of racially antagonistic emails. They were therefore widely assumed to be racially motivated.

=== 2013 mayoral election ===
==== 2013 mayoral campaign ====
During this fundraising Gala, Nenshi issued a challenge to his opponents to confront him directly and not to engage him in a proxy campaign of lobbying as he warns his supporters that his opponents will likely engage in.

In September 2013 when Nenshi's campaign began in earnest, he revealed the donors of his campaign before the election and urged his opponents to do likewise. Nenshi promised to instigate changes to improve the transparency of City Hall's municipal affairs as one of his 2010 campaign statements. According to the documents Nenshi's 1631 supporters derive from a wide range of core supporters. Among Nenshi's larger contributors were contractors from the housing construction industry, which according to Nenshi indicates that not all among the trade were antagonistic to Nenshi's anti-urban sprawl policies enacted early in his term.

===== Abolition of developer subsidy =====
For his campaign platform, Nenshi proposed to abolish the $4,800 granted to home builders, aiming to save the city $33 million per annum. According to Nenshi, the subsidy over a decade contributed to the municipal debt of $1.5 billion. Nenshi wanted free market factors to take hold of the housing market and developers to contribute to funding infrastructure to far-reaching suburbs by paying levies. The Manning Centre for Building Democracy supported the motion as supporting free market principles. The group however believed developers should pay slightly increased taxes as long as inner city communities equally also contribute their share of growth costs.

===== International Avenue business redevelopment zone =====
In October 2013, Nenshi and Councillors Andre Chabot and Gian-Carlo Carra proposed to realize a 2008 plan by then-Mayor Dave Bronconnier to redevelop International Avenue (17th Ave SE) as a vital transportation hub. Since inception of the plan in 2010, the project has been delayed due to costs. The plan incorporates a C-train line and rapid bus lanes, proposed in Calgary Transit's 'Route Ahead' plan. As well, the revitalization incorporates urban renewal projects like renovated apartments and business buildings. Carra studied the circumstances for Forest Lawn's urban decay and planned the neighborhood's restoration as his master thesis. Carra explained that the neighbourhood had not been adequately integrated since it was incorporated into the city of Calgary in 1961.

=== 2017 mayoral election ===
Nenshi indicated his intention to run for a 3rd term on November 4, 2016. On October 16, 2017, Nenshi won a third term winning over 50% of the vote. The third election has been wrought with controversy as select neighbourhoods ran out of ballots and waiting lines to vote were hours long, resulting in lost votes.

On April 6, 2021, Nenshi announced that he would not seek re-election for a 4th term in the 2021 Calgary municipal election. The election was won by councillor Jyoti Gondek.

== Tenure ==
=== Positions ===
In 2013, Nenshi supported the proposed Keystone XL pipeline network. He explained that opposition and protests were foolish as the pipe network could mitigate environmental damage caused from the transport of oil.

In 2014, Nenshi refused to present musician Neil Young with a Calgary White Hat, a traditional token of the city's hospitality to prominent guests. Nenshi stated that he did not normally present honours to entertainers. Young was performing his Honour the Treaties benefit tour to raise legal funds on behalf of the Athabasca Chipewyan First Nation. The ACFN is appealing government approval to expand fracking on their territory.

In 2014, Nenshi delivered a speech to the Calgary Economic Development speakers' series on diversity. Nenshi explained that there was a lack of ethnic and gender diversity among senior city staff. Nenshi stated that although the city had an excellent record of hiring minorities and women, they may experience a ceiling to promotions and advancement.

In 2017 Calgary, as with many municipalities in Western Canada, recorded an increase in the number of overdoses and fatalities related to an opioid epidemic. During a conference of Canadian mayors, Nenshi invited the federal government to use Calgary as a test city to implement harm reductionist pilot projects and gather research unique to Calgary's needs.

Although Nenshi's second term council voted to end addition of fluoride to Calgary's drinking water, he personally supports water fluoridation. He does however support more depth in the research literature related to municipal water fluoridation. Calgary has undertaken five plebiscites on water fluoridation, initially voting in favour of the practice in 1998. In 2016, the city council rejected a call for another vote, but in January 2019, Ward 11 Councillor Jeromy Farkas requested a report on the history and cost of water fluoridation from the city administration in preparation for a possible 2021 plebiscite.

==== Relationship with housing industry ====
Nenshi's policy of exercising greater city control over urban growth to manage urban sprawl is one of his key campaign promises. As expected, Nenshi's council has regularly collided with key associations of Calgary's housing industry. Frictions between the Nenshi council and key housing industry associations are an ongoing, overlapping, and escalating affair. Grievances continuously surfaced during the 2013 election, for example the "Cal Wenzel video", rumour-mongering about a pro-development slated council, and the Wenzel slander lawsuit of 2013.

Early in 2013, Nenshi's council suspended relations with the Calgary branch of the Canadian Home Builders' Association. The CHBA as a result was banned briefly from attending planning sessions. This action was conducted after the Calgary branch president Charron Ungar commented that the city was enacting a policy of "suburban freeze". Ungar commented upon a city plan which scheduled two suburb developments within 10 years.

Nenshi declared that the CHBA and the Urban Development Institute (UDI) were representing the housing industry poorly after a controversial article was published by the UDI. The article suggested that minorities might not find suburban living comfortable. Nenshi suspended relations with the UDI soon after the article was published. Nenshi also felt that it was more expedient for the city to deal directly with the construction industry.

==== Cal Wenzel housing lobby video ====
In 2013, a video was leaked of Cal Wenzel, the CEO and founder of Shane Homes, speaking to a panel of Calgarian home builders about a plan to influence the decisions of the city council after the upcoming elections. In the video Wenzel spoke of plans to raise $1.1 million to enlist the support of Preston Manning's conservative foundation, the Manning Centre for Building Democracy. According to the speech, former Mayor Dave Bronconnier counselled Wenzel on how to control council motions with eight votes. “So for whatever and however, we have to ensure that we end up with the eight votes.” Wenzel proposed a solution to circumvent direct confrontation with Nenshi's popularity. Wenzel named councillors the industry could rely on to support motions in favour of the lobby, and which he supported with donations. Nenshi has ordered a probe into what he described as distasteful and shadowy possible violations of electoral laws. In the wake of the release of this video, and violations of campaign fund limits set at $5,000, the Manning Centre has come under scrutiny.

In late 2013, Wenzel filed a $6 million slander lawsuit against Nenshi after he stated that Nenshi did not apologize within a reasonable time. Wenzel stated that his reputation was tarnished and that he was vilified as a subject of political opportunism during Nenshi and his allied counselor's platform campaigning. Wenzel stated that his comments in the video were taken out of context and manipulated by Nenshi to promote an agenda. Wenzel also complained of Nenshi tentatively comparing him to 'Godfather', as a reference to the titular character of Mario Puzo's novel and screenplay The Godfather. Nenshi in an interview with David Gray, host of CBC Radio's Calgary Eyeopener, described the meeting as a scene from the film The Godfather. When asked to clarify if Wenzel were the "Godfather" in this analogy, Nenshi ambiguously responded "maybe". The two reached an out-of-court settlement in December 2015, under which Nenshi agreed to apologize for and retract several comments he had made, while Wenzel expressed regret for any harm done to Nenshi's reputation and agreed that Nenshi has raised legitimate concerns about the potential chilling effect of lawsuits against politicians. Nenshi's legal bill of nearly $300,000 was paid by donations.

=== Calgary-Tsuu T'ina Nation relationships ===
Throughout his term, Nenshi met extensively with Chief Roy Whitney, the leader of the neighbouring Tsuu T'ina Nation, and former Chief Sandford Big Plume, to discuss matters of mutual assistance with growth. In 2011, Nenshi and Big Plume negotiated tentative agreements to ensure the security of greater access safety services such as emergency medical services, police, and fire.

The city agreed to provide utilities, such as water, to support the expansion of the Grey Eagle Casino, possibly allowing water works extension throughout the Tsuu T'ina community in the future.

=== Public works and infrastructure projects ===
Soon after assuming the office, Nenshi's council implemented many developments to revitalize Calgary's viability with capital infrastructure projects, such as redevelopment of the East Village neighbourhood with the New Central Library and the National Music Centre. Through a partnership with the local arts community, the city will preserve the historic King Edward School as an arts hub. Funding for these projects will mainly draw upon the Community Investment Fund, a fund created from tax revenue sources such as a $42 million annual refund from the provincial government

The goals of urban revitalization are planned to be realized through initiatives such as Supporting Partnership for Urban Reinvestment (SPUR). Nenshi's council debuted SPUR's pilot project as the restoration of the Kingsland neighborhood. The city solicited feedback from the community and expects to budget $230,000. The project was delayed until August by the floods of 2013.

The Nenshi administration completed capital public works projects approved by his predecessor Dave Bronconnier, including the westerly extension of the C-Train line, Peace Bridge, and the construction of a traffic tunnel to the Calgary International Airport, which has been completed.

Nenshi's council voted to discontinue fluoridating Calgary's water supply in February 2011.

As part of his campaign, Nenshi advocated to legalize "secondary housing" as a solution to housing shortage. A proposed bylaw is intended to create standardized safety requirements for the estimated 10,000–40,000 secondary suites which exist in the city. As one of the last decisions of Nenshi's term in 2013, the city motioned to waive the $4,485 application fee for rezoning of secondary suites. However, the decision will have to be brought into effect during the next government's term.

In 2013 the city approved a project to convert a block of derelict heritage buildings adjacent to the Central United Church into a first-of-its-kind robotic carpark. The facility will accommodate 338 cars and incorporate the renovated buildings, which the managing firm agrees to restore. Nenshi states this will improve the aesthetics of the eyesore skid row-like buildings. The project is planned to be self-funding as Calgary firm Heritage Property Corporation will attempt to raise the $40 million through private investment.

Nenshi ordered an investigation to find cost-effective solutions for a sanitary capacity issues affecting residents of northwest Calgary. If the $50 million expansion of the at-capacity Bowness sanitary line is not implemented, development in new and established communities in the quadrant may be delayed until 2017. The sanitary line also provides the town of Cochrane, contributing to the strain.

Nenshi expressed distaste of the free-standing public art project entitled the "Travelling Light" completed in 2013. He described the work as "awful and not the best use of tax dollars". The sculpture was sited along Airport Trail and drivers could not appreciate the "Big O" according to Nenshi. Travelling Light is described as a balanced 17-metre circle ring topped with balanced street lights. The motif of Travelling Light is supposed to represent transportation. The sculpture cost Calgary $471,000 and was paid through a grant from the Public Art Program, which reserves 1% of the annual budget for public art projects. The sculpture approved because of Nenshi's art initiative where a percentage of all city work had to be allocated to art. Travelling Light's submission was from a German artist, although three submissions were from Calgarians.

==== City consultation with environmental research group ====
In 2013, Sun Media journalist Ezra Levant said the city of Calgary contracted $340,000 to Pembina which he accused of being an anti-oil lobby group with insufficient scientific credentials.

Sun Media journalist Renato Gandia mentioned the Pembina Institute's contracts in an article with the headline "Mayor Naheed Nenshi says work done by left-leaning Pembina Institute think tank was not political in nature". Nenshi said it would be reasonable to hire the "best guy" regardless of personal political values.

The affair concluded with a Twitter argument when Nenshi responded to Levant's questioning. Levant questioned Nenshi about the ethics of city funds going to Pembina, if Pembina staff had worked on or donated to Nenshi's political campaigns. Nenshi responded by asking Levant rhetorically 'when did you stop beating your wife?'

==== Enmax ====
Nenshi ordered a corruption graft probe into the finances of city-owned utility company Enmax after an unknown senior employee revealed lavish spending by former Enmax CEO Gary Holden in 2010 in an email report. Holden was reported to have organized extravagant house celebrations entertained by rock stars, using Calgarian taxpayers' funds. Holden also gradually raised his salary from $700,000 to $2.7 million Holden resigned in 2011 after CBC News revealed a business trip to Monaco in 2008. Holden was a guest of German software company SAP and conducted business and watched the Monaco Grand Prix. Holden violated Enmax ethics policy to disclose incidents of gifts over $100. Holden earned the 5th place distinction of Forbes top 10 CEO screw ups for 2010. By the terms of contract Holden was granted a significant severance pay of $4.6 million.

Prior to the 2010 election, mayoral candidates McIver and Nenshi debated the justification for extravagant privileges of senior Enmax staff in their debates. Candidate Nenshi warned that Enmax was a city-run company and funds were taxpayers'. McIver described Enmax as an "Air of Entitlement". In 2011, in the wake of Holden's resignation, Nenshi's council and Enmax's board implemented reforms such as decreasing the salaries of senior staff, and a higher meritorious standard for bonuses. Enmax hired new management and a new CEO Gianna Manes, who is experienced in mass project completion such as the Shepard Energy Centre for which Holden advocated.

In 2011, Nenshi performed the ground breaking ceremony for Enmax's Shepard Energy Centre, a natural gas power plant capable of generating 800MW, more than half the electrical needs of Calgary. The facility was announced fully operational on March 11, 2015. The facility is described as Calgary's biggest project and cost $1.4 billion. Nenshi's council approved of the project which was planned during Bronconnier's term. The Shepard Energy Centre is connected to the Albertan power grid.

==== Public works of second term ====
Nenshi's council granted $5.5 million to build the 200-seat "Decidedly Jazz Danceworks Dance Centre" in the Belt Line neighbourhood. The new facility will address the expansion requirements of the Decidedly Jazz dance academy. The council decided that the facility would address the need to provide a permanent venue for the distinguished academy that served Calgary for many years. According to Nenshi, the facility will also help to fill the need in Calgary for more performing arts venues. Nenshi also hopes that this development would help stimulate development in the Beltline.

=== Transportation ===
The city constructed its first of many bicycle lanes in the downtown core. By 2020, it is estimated that the city will have 30 km of cycle lanes. In 2014, a plan will be submitted to begin to extend the network and enact a bylaw.

In late 2013, the city has entered into speculative agreement with the Tsuu T'ina to resume negotiating the extension of Stoney Trail through a portion of Tsuu T'ina land for a ring road. The band members were to vote in a referendum in October of the same year to decide on the issue. The city was in negotiations for over 50 years, with the last proposal in 2009 being rejected. Nenshi described the proposal as "win-win-win", however, should the band decide to ratify the agreement, construction won't commence for two years. On October 24, 2013, Tsuu T'ina tribe members voted in a referendum to permit the construction of the ring road on their territory. In exchange for 450 hectares of land, the nation will be compensated with 2,150 hectares of Crown land to expand their territories. The nation will also receive $340 million.

==== Calgary Transit ====
Calgary Transit presented Nenshi's administration with the "RouteAhead" plan for review. The plan calls for $13 billion to be invested over 30 years to expand and upgrade Calgary Transit's capabilities, for which funding is still pending. To address the problem of congestion of rush hour ridership, the city is upgrading busy C-train platforms to accommodate four-car trains. The city council has approved $200 million for the acquisition of 60 new four-car trains to replace obsolete U2 units which have served Calgary Transit since 1981. It is expected that the increased frequency of the trains will relieve crowded and full trains.

Nenshi abolished the $3 park-and-ride fees to encourage more commuters to use Calgary's Public Transit. Later, the decision was made to charge a $70 monthly fee for reserved parking.

==== Relationship with Canadian Pacific Railway ====
After Canadian Pacific Railway (CP) cancelled an environmental study of the expansion of Alyth train yard, the city approved to continue funding the study environmental impact the yard causes the residents of adjacent Inglewood and Ramsay neighborhoods. Nenshi attacked Canadian Pacific over the reassignment of the company's night crew. The company decided to close the 'Locomotive Reliability Centre' of the Alyth train yard. Transport Canada ordered it to relocate 400m away, as residents complained of the noise.

Nenshi rebuked CP over the collapse of the 101-year-old Bonnybrook Bridge. The bridge was weakened by the 2013 Alberta floods, as its structural supports were washed away by surging flood waters. He blamed a massive layoff prior to the accident for lax inspection standards and called for cities to have greater management of CP affairs within their cities.

Nenshi and CP agreed to improve communication in the future and improve relationships after several cars transporting petroleum derailed in late September 2013.

=== Social initiatives and amendments to bylaws ===
The Nenshi administration initiated many programs to improve civic administration and clarify transparency of city political affairs, organized around themes such as "transforming government" and "cutting red tape". These initiatives are intended to improve the business and quality of life for Calgarians. The Cutting red tape initiative was estimated to have saved Calgarians 33,000 in hours and $1.12 million in productivity. Nenshi sought the advice of Calgarians for further feedback and ideas of how to make city services easier to access in 2012 for its third phase of cutting red tape.

The term alderman was changed to the gender-neutral councillor.

In 2011, Nenshi was advised by civil advocacy group Civic Camp to challenge the citizens of Calgary with an initiative to personally take responsibility and encourage their neighbours do three things to improve their community for '3 Things for Calgary Program'.

In 2013, Nenshi implemented the 'Enough for All' program to half the demographic of 50,000 Calgarians living in poverty by 2023. The plan doesn't call for more spending, but to uncover and administer effective solutions to connect disadvantaged Calgarians with resources and the community. Nenshi made implementing this solution as one of his campaign promises.

The town of Airdrie passed an anti-bullying bylaw that was advocated by Airdrie teen Mackenzie Murphy in 2013 after she survived a suicide attempt in December 2012. She was persecuted for two years by online bullying and at school as her classmates suggested that she should kill herself. Airdrie Mayor Peter Brown, who was sympathetic to her distress, tasked his council to investigate the legal precedence to enact the bylaws.

She hopes to meet Nenshi to advocate for similar laws in Calgary and spread public awareness of bullying. Nenshi and Premier Redford expressed interest in her activism. Nenshi Chief of staff Chima Nkemdirim, suggests that Nenshi is open to dialog should she decide to take the initiative by scheduling an appointment.

In 2013, the city council enacted a bylaw banning smoking in playgrounds and other places where family and children play.

The length of council terms was extended from three years to four years.

==== Calgary Police and crime ====
Continuing on a downward trend of violent crimes since 1991, Calgary's together with Canada's crime rate has dropped. As of 2013 the national crime rate has dropped below levels since 1971. It is unknown what has caused the decline in violent crimes; however, Statistics Canada analyst Mary Allen correlates that communities with higher standards of socio-economic conditions tend to have low crime rates. Many other urban areas have experienced similar decreases in crime rates, and recent studies suggest this may primarily be due to decreased environmental levels of lead. Calgary has experienced significant percentage drops since 2011, such as a 23% drop in robberies. In 2012 Calgary's Crime Severity Index of 60.5 is below the national rating of 75.

In 2013, community service groups and the Calgary Police Service banded together to form the Safe Communities Opportunity and Resource Centre (SCORCe) as a cooperative effort to improve effective services for vulnerable Calgarians.

In September 2013, the city extended the contract of Police Chief Rick Hanson until 2017. Nenshi credits his leadership as a factor for Calgary's low crime fortunes.

=== Enterprise and financial initiatives ===
The city created the Community Investment Fund to grant $252 million between 2012 and 2016 to renovate and construct new Calgarian public recreation and community facilities such as libraries. The fund provides funding for community groups to renovate their facilities that provide services to Calgarians. The fund is composed from major sources such as annual rebate of $42 million from the Alberta government, $4 million from GST refund, and $150 million from a fund created by urban developers for community growth. The fund was a response to address the need for access for recreational services, especially sports and physical facilities for children. Such as ice rinks and swimming pools. The fund also addresses the need for renovations for many aging facilities providing essential services for Calgarians. The city will construct four new facilities providing access for 84,000 Calgarians.

Nenshi approved a pilot project in 2011 for mobile food van servers. The project debuted during the first "YYC Taste the Trucks" an annual festival in 2011. After a two-year pilot trial, the city council approved a process draft a bylaw to permit the food truck industry permanently in late 2013.

The Calgary Economic Development (CED) organized a trade mission for Nenshi to showcase Calgary to meet with Chinese business and government officials to forge and reassert ties between China and Calgary.

Address the problem of inaccessibility of housing for families and attain success with the Plan to End Homelessness which began before his term. The city operates non-tax non-profit corporation, 'Attainable Homes' which partners up businesses to help provide for impoverished Calgarian families. However the corporation was not initially Nenshi's initiative as it was founded in 2009. Mass building projects were completed and initiated during his term.

During the Liberal Party caucus retreat to Calgary in 2017, Nenshi advocated for Calgary to be the base of the 'Canadian Infrastructure Bank'. He cited that Calgary was an ideal location as many talented finance professionals reside in Calgary and the decision would help create diversification of economic development into Western Canada.

In 2017 during a technology trade mission to California Nenshi convinced a company to establish an office in Calgary. He states that it is a well-known company but has not as yet revealed. He also states that there have been inquiries from prospective technology companies.

=== Taxation and city finances ===
==== Increases of property tax ====
As Calgary grew into a metropolis with challenging needs the city experienced typical increased incremental costs of living such as rises in property taxes. Taxes began to rise before Nenshi's government as both the provincial and city governments have increased taxes since 2007 for several years and Mayor Dave Bronconnier commissioned civic work projects, as Ctrain extension. Tax rates increased on average 5–10%/year for city taxes and 3–8%/year for provincial taxes. The increase in taxes was a source of frustration for many Calgarians over the years, especially after rising 33% during Nenshi's first three-year term, and an additional 14.37% property tax increase through three years of Nenshi's second four-year term in office.

Nenshi has encountered frustrations as his council finds it difficult to budget yearly with unsecured sources of provincial and federal funding. Nenshi with other Canadian mayors rebuked the Federal government for lack of capital funding for necessary projects such as transportation infrastructure projects such as public transit and improved highways as they have in the United States.

The lack of fiscal clarification from the federal and provincial government has economically damaged the city causing debt and raised erratic municipal taxes as the city struggles to secure funding for projects to maintain the city. Dave Bronconnier faced similar challenges as Nenshi managing a growing city. Nenshi is tasked with completion of Bronconnier's necessary projects such as extension of the C-train.

However, Nenshi together with Stephen Mandel attempted to negotiate with Premier Alison Redford to enact a charter to replace the decades-old ambiguous Municipal Act, to better define the roles of provincial and municipal governments. As the uncertain nature of non-municipal funding is unpredictable. Redford was forced to resort to Austerity measures such as educational cutbacks early in her term. Her government is experiencing a 5-year deficit, and will go into debt as it continues infrastructural spending.

Nenshi stated that taxes remained the lowest in Canada when compared to other major Canadian municipalities. However, during Nenshi's two terms in office, median property taxes were increased by 52% between 2010 and 2016.

==== Taxation of second term ====
For the 2014 budget the city voted to return the initial $52 million provincial tax refund as debated early in 2012. The refunded tax gap afforded the city to reduce an initial planned 6% increase in residential property tax to a 5% increase.

In December 2013, Nenshi warned of prospective tax raises of 5% over the next four-year budget. He suggested that the best way to avoid or mitigate the increases was to implement a policy diversified sources of funding besides property taxes. Nenshi disfavours property tax as being archaic and unable to effectively collect revenue for capital civil works such as upgrading transportation. He favours a mixture of sources such as business taxes. Nenshi states that currently only the province have the authority to enact legislature that fundamentally defines sources of revenue. Nenshi and his Edmontonian mayor counterparts Stephen Mandel and Don Iveson have been negotiating with the Albertan government to enact a city charter. The charter would clarify the responsibilities of the Municipal and Provincial governments such as taxation. Nenshi anticipates the ratification of the charter in 2014.

==== Financial decisions ====
The city implemented a 10-year plan to merge the business tax with the non-residential property tax. Until then Calgary was one of the last cities to have a stand-alone business tax.

Towards the end of first Nenshi's term, the Manning Centre published a study entitled "Growing the Democratic Toolbox: city council vote tracking" by Jeromy Farkas. The research measured the performance of 2010 city council on the economic stances of councilors (taxpayer friendly scale), frequency of open meetings, and attendance of council meetings. According to the study these topics were of importance to Calgarians. Contrary to Nenshi's critics, who were frustrated with tax increases and capital spending and had nicked named Nenshi as "Spendshi", Farkas gauged Nenshi to be a moderate spender. Nenshi scored 50.7% and was ranked 5th out of 14 councillors on the "Taxpayer Friendly Scale". Nenshi's score was based on how many times he voted against motions of capital spending with a sample of 73 motions pertaining to city finance.

==== Property tax surplus ====
The city council asked Calgarians for their opinion of how to invest a $52 million surplus from an over collection of property taxes. A debate was held in May 2013 and offered five options: return the money to Calgarians as a rebate, invest in revitalizing older neighborhoods, improve Calgary Transit, reduction in taxes for businesses, and reducing the city's debt. A live debate inspired by the reality show "Dragon's Den" was held at the Devonian Gardens. In the wake of the devastating flood of 2013, the city council voted to implement Nenshi's proposal to use the surplus towards flood relief. However, the Canadian Taxpayer Federation warns that motion could become a permanent tax grab. That the money was intended to be returned to citizens.

During deliberations of the 2014 budget majority of the councilors voted in favour of returning the 2013 provincial $52 million tax refund.

==== Financial decisions of second term ====
Nenshi's council have voted to halt council salary raises, and limit salaries of non-unionized city staff to 1.8% raises for 2014. According to councilors Shane Keating and Diane Colley-Urquhart economic factors decided the austerity measures. City unionizes however remains skeptical as Calgary city council have employed such austerity measures in the past prior to renegotiating term contracts and awarding themselves with opulent raise increases. Nenshi donated 10% of his 2012 salary, amounting to CA$20,000, to a Calgary charity in response to a 6% pay raise approved for city councillors.

=== Key events of first term ===
In 2011, Nenshi was grand marshal of Calgary Pride, the city's gay pride parade. He was the first mayor of Calgary to do so. In 2013 Nenshi proclaimed a "Trans Day of Visibility" as an awareness day for the challenges transgender and transsexual Calgarians face. Nenshi together with Albertan Premier Alison Redford who became the first Premier to Grand Marshal the parade, opened the 23rd Calgarian Pride parade. In his speech Nenshi addressed Québécois, inviting them to come to Calgary as the city didn't discriminate. He criticized Quebec's proposed 'Charter of Quebec Values' legislature as contrary to the Canadian Charter of Rights and Freedoms.

Nenshi presided over the 100th anniversaries of many important city institutions and traditions, including the Calgary Public Library, Calgary Stampede, Mount Royal University, and Calgary recreation. He proclaimed March 29, 2012, a "dress Western day" as a prelude to the 100th Calgary Stampede. The city was assisted in preparations for these celebrations with a $1.6 million grant from the federal government.

Nenshi proclaimed the week of November 7–14, 2011, as "Town Planning Week", to celebrate the 100th anniversary of Calgary Planning Commission's achievements. He presented David Watson the Chair of the commission with a commemorative scroll honouring the names of past and present members.

Nenshi donated $660 to two Toronto food banks, after the Calgary Stampeders lost the 2012 Grey Cup as per the terms of a friendly bet made with Toronto mayor Rob Ford.

In 2012 the federal government designated the city for the inaugural "Cultural Capital" program.

In 2013 Nenshi was invited as part of the Canadian delegation attend the World Economic Forum to share his ideas of sustainable urban growth, a rarity for a mayor. At forum Nenshi supported the controversial Keystone Pipeline by commenting that protesters were foolish and that transporting Bitumen by conventional transportation such as trains would cause more atmospheric pollution.

Nenshi closed the 2013 inaugural "Tour of Alberta" cyclist marathon with a speech thanking Calgarians who have banded together after the 2013 summer flood.

Nenshi proclaimed April 5, 2013, as Ralph Klein Day to honour the contributions Klein made to Calgary as mayor: the founding of the Calgary Economic Development an agency that promotes the prosperity of Calgary, the construction of the C-Train LRT, and host of the 1988 Winter Olympics. His widow Colleen Klein was presented with the civic flag of Calgary. Klein's life was remembered in a city organized gala entitled "Celebration of Life" that celebrated his contributions as a public servant and adopted son of the Siksika Nation. Nenshi along with other Canadian politicians past and present spoke at the gala reflecting on the life of Klein.

==== 2013 flood and reconstruction ====
Nenshi's rally to boost morale in the wake of a devastating flood that ravaged Southern Alberta in 2013 was well received by the press and Calgarians. He urged Calgarians to seek assistance for mental distress urged support for their neighbors mental and emotional well-being during the disaster recovery. Calgarian approval from his supporters has made him the subject of internet memes parodying him as Supermayor as 2013 Summer blockbuster movie Superman. His name was used as a verb for a parody of the British WWII morale slogan "Keep Calm and Carry On", as "Keep Calm and Nenshi On". The likeness of Nenshi wearing Scuba gear, was designed by Calgarian artist "Mandy Stobo" on T-shirts, to raise relief funds for the Red Cross.

Nenshi co-launched book published by the Calgary Herald entitled The Flood of 2013: A Summer of Angry Rivers in southern Alberta, which archived the paper's coverage of the flood. Proceeds from the book supported The Calgary Foundation's Flood Rebuilding Fund which helped victims most devastated.

Some of his supporters urged him to rest from his nonstop organization by taking a nap as he coordinated relief efforts non-stop over a period of 43 hours. For an episode of his YouTube vlog series "Nenshi Reads", Nenshi read to children at a fundraising launch of children's story "The River Throws a Tantrum" by Rona Altrows.

Nenshi tasked former City transportation director Gordon Stewart with overseeing the reconstruction efforts. The flood caused an estimated $250 million in damages. Nenshi, commissioned a panel of engineering and environmental experts as well the community to recommend measures to mitigate damage from future floods.

Senior city staff were compensated for overtime work directing the emergency efforts with $307,000. Nenshi believed the compensation to be unwarranted and called to change the compensation regulations for compensation in the future.

In September Governor General David Johnston, presented the people of Calgary with the "Governor General Commendation of Outstanding Service". As the community effort Calgarians banded together for the city and surrounding region after the 2013 Alberta floods.

In November 2013, the Government of Alberta granted the City of Calgary $250,000 to study the viability of constructing a water diversion tunnel. Nenshi suggested that the city acquire the tunnel-boring machinery. After the project the machinery could be used for infrastructure projects the city has planned.

=== Key events of second third terms ===
Soon after winning the 2013 mayoral elections in October, Nenshi chaperoned disabled Calgarian children to Disneyland for Air Canada's 21st annual 'Dreams take Flight' charity service.

Early in November 2013, Nenshi delivered a comic 'roasting' speech to outgoing Edmontonian mayor Stephen Mandel highlighting the joys and frustrations of a colleague, mentor, and rival relationship. Nenshi made light remarks alluding to Rob Ford's narcotic addictions, their religious heritage as mayors of 'redneck' cities, and Mandel's council decision to construct massive public works projects such as the Edmonton Downtown arena.

For the two weeks duration of the 2014 Winter Olympics, Nenshi decided that city hall would fly the rainbow gay pride flag to protest the anti-gay stance of the Russian government.

In 2014, Nenshi's council had decided on the fate of a city-owned 'Midfield Mobile Home Park'. The city decided to cease operations as of September 2017. The property's aging utilities such as obsolete water works have rendered the site un-viable as upkeep have become difficult and costly.

However some Midfield residents who have built equity with their mobile homes believe that the compensation is inadequate and worry that there may not a place to relocate to. The city decided against developing the proposed East Hills Estates, mobile home park. According to community President Rudy Prediger the secretive nature of the dealings have caused problematic worries among his neighbors. Some neighbors sold their mobile homes at a loss. Elderly Midfield residents who have deep rooted ties of affinity with the community are reluctant to move. Resident's relocation stresses are further compounded with the complications caused by low vacancy in Calgary in the wake of the devastating 2013 flood.

Nenshi ran and won re-election in the 2017 Calgary municipal elections.

==== Reconciliation with First Nations communities ====
In accordance of 2015 Trudeau's campaign promise for reconciliation with First Nation (FN) people of Canada. The Federal, Provincial, and Municipal governing bodies of Canada began the dialog intended to redress the historical deficits and misgivings caused by centuries of abusive political inequalities. Calgary's city council commissioned its citizen based Aboriginal advisory board the 'Calgary Aboriginal Urban Affairs Committee' to research on social conditions and advise an action plan to implement. The report entitled the 'White Goose Flying' report enacts on the Truth and Reconciliation Commission's (TRC) agreement to begin dialog to redress the abuses of former residential school students; as well as acknowledge the inter-generational traumas of the human rights abuses suffered by aboriginals. The report is named after 18-year-old 'Jack White Goose Flying' who was formerly an unknown Calgary Indian industrial school\St. Dustan's student buried in a grave in what would become the industrial-residential neighborhood of Ogden. White Goose Flying was taken from Brocket within the Piikani Nation

In 2017 The Langevin Bridge spanning the Bow River was voted to be renamed the Reconciliation Bridge to downtown Calgary after the public expressed misgivings about naming the structure after Sir Hector-Louis Langevin. He was a principal architect of the Residential School system.

In municipal accordance to the Federal and provincial gestures of reconciliation with First Nations communities, Nenshi presided with Native leaders in a drumming ceremony honouring the permanent raising of flag of Treaty 7 along the provincial, national, and municipal flags outside city hall.

==== Olympic bid ====
Nenshi expressed intrigue at the prospect of the city hosting a second Winter Olympics in 2026 as Toronto announced its withdrawal from the 2024 Summer Olympics bid. Nenshi confirmed that he has met with a group of Calgarian citizens who were meeting to discuss proposing a bid. Nenshi has adopted a wait and see policy after the group organizes a detailed plan to the public.

In summer 2016, the city officially voted in favour of funding $5 million to the Calgary Bid Exploration Committee to report about the economic viability of hosting the 2026 Olympics.

Nenshi also vacationed in Rio during the 2016 Summer Olympics and discussed the prospects of Calgary hosting the 2026 Winter Olympics with IOC officials. According to Nenshi they were very receptive to the prospective bid.

==== CalgaryNEXT ====
After calls for new venues in the city, CalgaryNEXT, which would have replaced both the Scotiabank Saddledome and McMahon Stadium for Calgary's professional hockey and Canadian football teams was announced. That proposal included two buildings: a 19,000–20,000 seat events centre to serve as the new home arena of two hockey clubs, the National Hockey League's Calgary Flames, and the Calgary Hitmen of the Western Hockey League, as well as the Calgary Roughnecks lacrosse team; and a 40,000-seat football stadium and fieldhouse for the Canadian Football League's Calgary Stampeders and serve as a public training and activity space. The complex, originally planned to be located in West Village along the Bow River as a "hub of pro and amateur sporting activity."

Immediate reactions to the CalgaryNEXT proposal from local politicians were mixed; they supported the plan to redevelop the West Village area, but many – including Mayor Nenshi – expressed concern at the proposal, which would potentially have the city initially fund between $440 and $690 million of the projected cost which promoters claimed would be recouped over a long period of time. As part of the proposal, the facilities would be owned by the city and managed by the privately owned Calgary Sports and Entertainment Corporation (CSEC) - thus exempting the land from property taxes - but with the city not receiving any share of the profits.

Originally projected as costing $890 million, based on a City of Calgary report released in April 2016 it was estimated that CalgaryNEXT would cost approximately $1.8 billion, with taxpayers paying up to two-thirds of the total.

In April 2017, the Calgary city council voted unanimously to instead support an alternate plan located near the Saddledome.

===== Event centre =====
On September 12, 2017, Flames president and chief executive officer Ken King stated that the team was no longer pursuing the CalgaryNEXT arena, as "we've been working for a long time trying to come up with a formula that really works to replace this building and we really put our best foot forward and I've come to the conclusion sadly and I'm very disappointed that I don't think we can make a deal that works for us". Mayor Nenshi subsequently proposed a partnership wherein portions of the cost of "plan B" would be covered by the city, and the rest covered by the team ownership and user surcharges. King objected to this proposal.

On July 30, 2019, the Calgary city council approved a $550 million new Event Centre. The new arena was to be located to the north of the Saddledome in the Victoria Park neighbourhood. Construction on the building would have begun in 2021, and have a capacity of around 19,000. Plans for the Event Centre also included the possibility of a smaller arena to replace the Stampede Corral. The city of Calgary would have owned the Event Centre while CSEC would have been responsible for the facility's operation and maintenance, keeping all revenue under a 35-year lease agreement, which included a non-relocation clause for the Flames during that period. Had the project went through, The Saddledome would have been demolished after the new arena opened.

On April 14, 2021, the deal for the new arena was put on hold by Calgary city council over budget concerns.

On July 26, 2021, the city announced the cost of the arena had gone from $550 million to $608.5 million. The arena was planned to utilize an "inverted bowl" design which may not have been feasible on the selected piece of land and posed accessibility concerns. As the project progressed further into design work, other potential problems were uncovered, resulting in cost overruns. To address these overruns, it was announced that both the City of Calgary and Calgary Sports and Entertainment Corporation would each be putting forward an additional $12.5 million, a clause agreed on in the deal signed in 2019. The Calgary Sports and Entertainment Corporation then agreed to cover any potential future overruns. Additionally, the city announced as part of the updated deal with CSEC that the Calgary Municipal Land Corp (CMLC). would be removed as project manager and replaced with an organization of CSEC's choosing. It broke ground in 2024 and is now called Scotia Place.

==== Cal Wenzel slander lawsuit ====
In November 2013, Cal Wenzel, CEO of Shane Homes, attempted to sue Nenshi for $6 million, alleging slanderous remarks to his character promote his campaign agenda. In particular Wenzel was offended when Nenshi compared him to the Godfather during an interview with David Grey of CBC One.

In his defence statement, Nenshi explained his reasons for comparing Wenzel's personae to fictional mobster Vito Corleone, the Godfather. Nenshi described Wenzel as being benevolent but ruthless when faced with opposition. Nenshi's defence lawyers also noted that Wenzel referred Nenshi as being "dark sided" in a video which Wenzel addresses an audience of home builders.

On December 14, 2015, Justice David Gates ordered Wenzel to pay Nenshi $10,000 over the plaintiff's unsuccessful bid for a summary judgement.

The lawsuit had been scheduled for February 2016, but on December 15, 2015, the two parties agreed to an out-of-court settlement, apologizing to each other and effectively ending the lawsuit. On May 11, 2016, it was revealed the city paid nearly $300,000 in legal fees during the lawsuit, which Nenshi will pay back via a fund-raising campaign.

==== Allegations of alcohol and substance abuse among councillors during city functions ====
In early 2015 Nenshi's city council became marred in a scandal involving frequent drunken celebrations and substance abuse among council members, which the media dubbed "Blottogate". On January 20, 2015, Councillor Druh Farrell made allegations during a council 'Priorities and Finance Committee' meeting. She accused council members of engaging in drunken revelries and drinking while on duty or during city sponsored functions. Nenshi further added that he had received numerous complaints of councillors getting "blotto" (drunk) and abusing narcotics.

However, according to an interview with the Calgary Eye Opener of the CBC News, Councillor Ward Sutherland explained that the titular "wild party" that Farrell referenced in her accusations occurred during the Christmas of 2007, years before Nenshi's current sitting council. Sutherland counter charged that Farrell was making unsubstantiated accusations, and that sober councillors are upset for being generically summed in her allegations. He also stated that her charges were an insult to his colleagues. Councillor Ray Jones, and Councillor Andre Chabot likewise recalls the singular 'wild Christmas party' years before contradicting Farrell and Nenshi's claim of frequent inebriated celebrations. Councillors have claimed that Farrell and Nenshi's accusations were not based on evidence, and they demanded that Nenshi either offers an apology if he could not support his claims. They complained their professional reputations were damaged and Sutherland claimed that he has been occasionally ridiculed by the public. Councillor Magliocca claimed that his offices was inundated with phone calls from his worried constituency. Sutherland and Magliocca's children suffered harassment from their classmates. Magliocca intends to pressure Nenshi for an official statement during a question period on January 26, 2015. Nenshi has since refused to recant his statement.

=== Calgary Street Church conflict ===
Street Church Ministries pastor Artur Pawlowski accused Nenshi of anti-Judeo-Christian discrimination when Nenshi did not allow Pawlowski to hold a religious service inside City Hall despite not having requested the ordinary permit to do so. “'City hall is considered to be an office building,' says Paul Tolley, solicitor with the city. 'People need to apply for permits and receive permission to hold events inside the atrium of city hall,' he says." Nenshi partook in the lighting the fifth light of the menorah ceremony in 2011 as the Calgarian Jewish community celebrated the 23rd Menorah lighting ceremony. Other groups are free to celebrate at City Hall and other venues on city property provided they apply for permission such as agreeing not to celebrate during business hours.

=== City charter ===
To address the challenges of evolving into metropolises Nenshi and former Edmonton mayor Stephen Mandel negotiated a memorandum of understanding with the Alberta government. This motion will enable both mayors to work with the provincial government to draft city charters, effectively articulating the powers and responsibilities the municipalities have to deal with unique issues of development such as taxation. Nenshi and Mandel wanted to seek the approval for the new city council's approval after the elections of the 2013 before proceeding to resume discussions.

However these motions were initially opposed by tax watchdog groups. They warn that such legislatures may grant municipal governments the ability to levy additional taxes.

On October 7, 2014, Alberta Premier Jim Prentice, Nenshi, and Edmonton mayor Don Iveson signed a framework agreement enabling the provincial and municipal governments of Edmonton and Calgary to formalize the charter by the spring of 2016. According to the agreement although the municipalities won't be granted authority to levy new taxes; they will have the authority to create unique solutions that addresses the problems of their respective municipalities.

Political offices
Preceded by Dave Bronconnier	Mayor of Calgary; October 25, 2010 – October 25, 2021	Succeeded by Jyoti Gondek
