= West Village, Calgary =

Coordinates: 51.046°N 114.100°W

West Village, located in Calgary, Alberta, Canada, south of the Bow River, west of 14 Street, and north of the West LRT line, is an inner-city area which was previously targeted by Calgary Sports and Entertainment (CSE) for major redevelopment. The plans included the building of CalgaryNEXT, a proposed $890 million sports complex.
