= Naheed Nenshi =

Canadian politician (born 1972)

Naheed Nenshi MLA
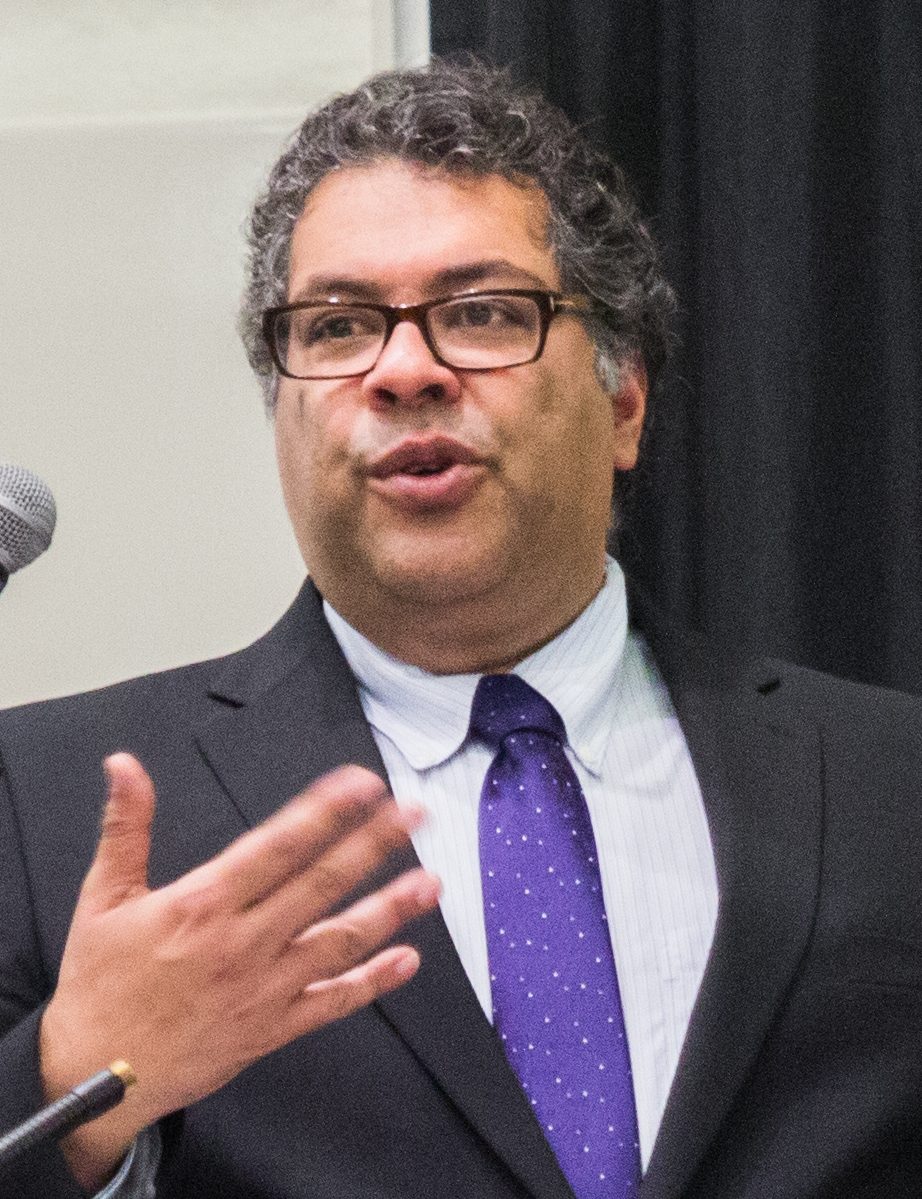
- Nenshi in 2015

Leader of the Opposition of Alberta
- Incumbent
- Assumed office July 12, 2025
- Preceded by: Christina Gray

Leader of the Alberta New Democratic Party
- Incumbent
- Assumed office June 22, 2024
- Deputy: Rakhi Pancholi
- Preceded by: Rachel Notley

Member of the Legislative Assembly for Edmonton-Strathcona
- Incumbent
- Assumed office June 23, 2025
- Preceded by: Rachel Notley

36th Mayor of Calgary
- In office October 25, 2010 – October 25, 2021
- Preceded by: Dave Bronconnier
- Succeeded by: Jyoti Gondek

Personal details
- Born: Naheed Kurban Nenshi; February 2, 1972 (age 54) Toronto, Ontario, Canada
- Party: Alberta New Democratic Party (since 2024)
- Education: University of Calgary; Harvard University
- Profession: Academic; management consultant

Naheed Kurban Nenshi (born February 2, 1972) is a Canadian politician who has served as the leader of the Alberta New Democratic Party (NDP) since 2024 and as leader of the Official Opposition since 2025. He previously served as the 36th mayor of Calgary for three terms from 2010 to 2021.

Nenshi attended the University of Calgary and earned degrees in commerce as well a Master of Public Policy from the John F. Kennedy School of Government at Harvard University. Prior to entering politics, he worked as a management consultant as well as an instructor in non-profit management in the Bissett School of Business at Mount Royal University and wrote a regular municipal affairs column for the Calgary Herald.

Nenshi won the 2010 mayoral election with 39% of the vote. Being a Shia Ismaili, he became the first Muslim to become mayor of a major Canadian city. He was re-elected in 2013 with 74% of the vote and again re-elected in 2017 to a third term with 51% of the vote. After serving three terms as mayor, he did not seek re-election in the 2021 Calgary municipal election and was succeeded by Jyoti Gondek.

In March 2024, Nenshi announced he would run for leader of the Alberta NDP. He won on the first ballot with 86% support and 62,746 votes. He became a member of the Legislative Assembly (MLA) in June 2025, winning the Edmonton-Strathcona by-election and assuming the title of leader of the Opposition.

== Early life, education, and career ==
Naheed Kurban Nenshi was born in Toronto, Ontario, and raised in Calgary and Red Deer County. His parents, Kurbanali Hussein, a small business owner, and Noorjah, were Ismaili Muslims of Indian Gujarati origin who immigrated to Canada from Tanzania in 1971. He has an older sister. Nenshi has persistent edema of rosacea.

Nenshi was educated at the University of Calgary, serving as president of the students' union and receiving a Bachelor of Commerce in 1993, and completed a Master of Public Policy from the John F. Kennedy School of Government at Harvard University in 1998. During his time at the University of Calgary, he was taught by former premier Peter Lougheed in the same political science class as Danielle Smith, who later became premier.

Nenshi worked for McKinsey & Company for several years before starting Ascend Group, his own consulting firm, which advised non-profit, private and public sector organizations. The firm also advised the United Nations on ways to encourage wealthy corporations to engage in Corporate Citizenship. As a young professional, he developed his administrative capabilities by joining Canada25, a federal networking organization that mentored professionals under 35 of public policy and leadership. Nenshi was a constant debate opponent of Toronto Sun journalist Ezra Levant; Levant later became a recurring critic of Nenshi's policies.

In 2002, Nenshi wrote about how cities can retain young professionals and use resources effectively in a publication entitled "Building Up: Making Canada's Cities Engines of Growth and Magnets of Development". In 2006, Nenshi was the chief author for "ImagineCalgary's 100-year plan".

Nenshi first ventured into politics in 2004, running unsuccessfully for a seat on Calgary's city council. He co-founded two citizens' groups aimed at improving Calgary's civic government. In 2009, Nenshi was invited to become a founding member of Civic Camp, an active citizenship forum that encourages and enables Calgarians to actively engage and collaborate ideas in civic affairs. He co-founded city hall watch dog group Better Calgary Campaign.

He was an instructor in non-profit management in the Bissett School of Business at Mount Royal University and wrote a regular municipal affairs column for the Calgary Herald.

Nenshi giving a campaign speech in July 2010

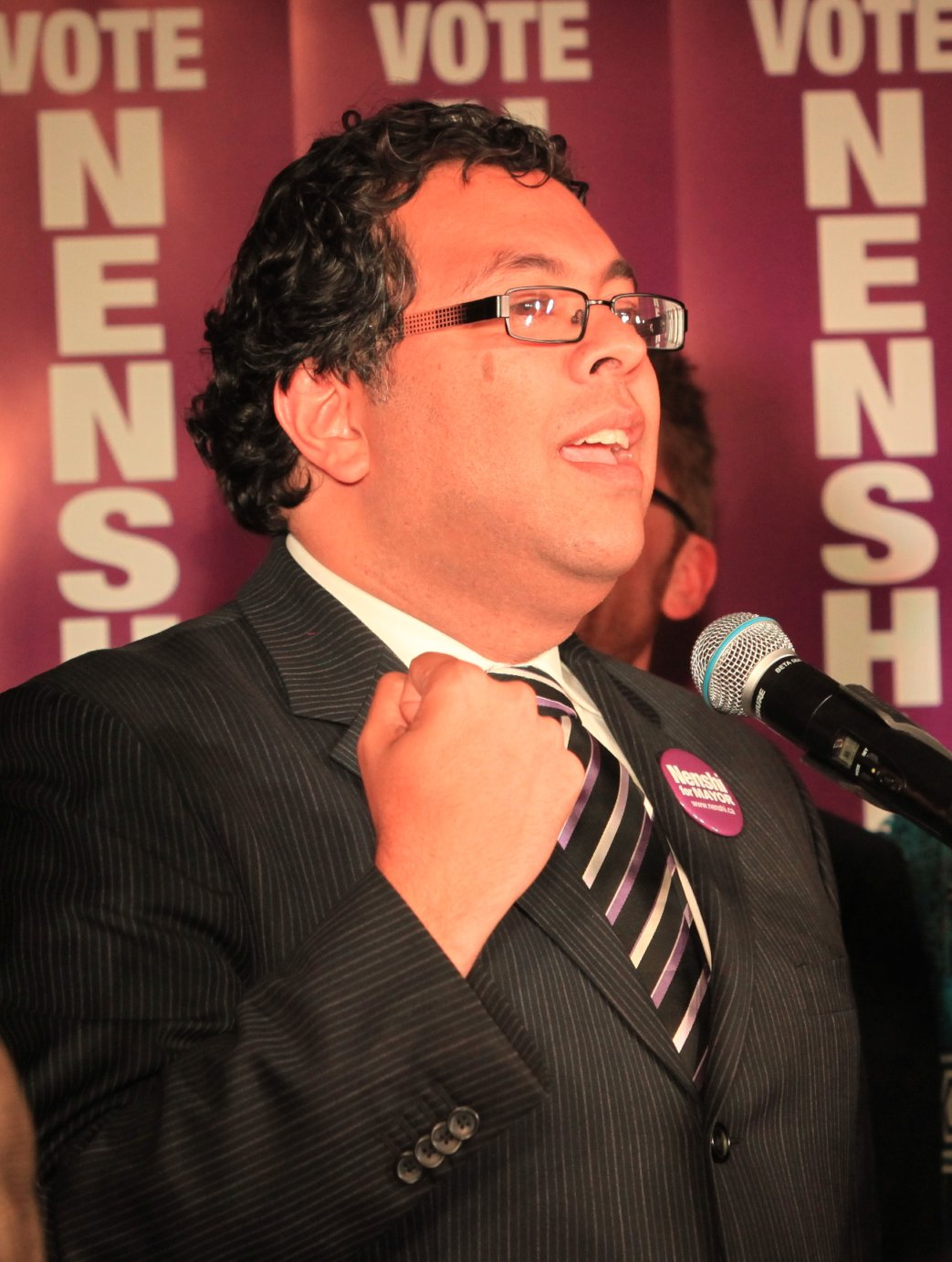
Nenshi speaking to supporters and media shortly after being projected to win

== Mayor of Calgary (2010–2021) ==
=== Elections ===
==== 2010 election ====
His 2010 campaign for mayor, dubbed the "Purple Revolution", was uniquely a viral campaign which relied heavily on using social media to promote his platform and hyper-engage voters. According to Nenshi's campaign IT specialist Richard Einarson, the name "Purple Revolution" was chosen because the campaign wanted broad appeal across the socio-economic spectrum of liberal ('red') and conservative ('blue') voters.

A late September poll showed that his campaign was generating interest as he sat third with eight per cent support, although well behind the leaders, alderman Ric McIver (42%) and local media personality Barb Higgins (28%). His growing popularity led to greater scrutiny of his views, including a public dispute with Calgary Police Service chief Rick Hanson over the cost of policing the city.

Days before the election, a Calgary Herald poll showed that Nenshi's grassroots campaign continued to gain momentum as he had 30 per cent support among decided voters, placing him in a statistical tie with McIver and Higgins. He polled the strongest amongst younger voters, believed to be the result of his social media campaign. Nenshi's surge in popularity carried through to the election, when he earned 40 per cent of the vote, finishing nearly 28,000 votes ahead of second-placed McIver.

On September 11, 2010, 20 of Nenshi's campaign advertisements in the city were vandalized or destroyed and a brick was thrown through one of his campaign office's windows. The attacks, which commemorated the ninth anniversary of the September 11 attacks in New York City, were accompanied by a series of racially antagonistic emails. They were therefore widely assumed to be racially motivated.

His win was viewed as a breakthrough for the use of social media as an election tool, and when considered with his faith and background, made international headlines. His election is seen as major signal of the shift in Albertan politics and the demography of Calgary. He engaged voters with a mutual two-way dialogue as "politics in full sentences".

==== 2013 election ====
When Nenshi's re-election campaign began in earnest in September 2013, he revealed the donors of his campaign before the election and urged his opponents to do likewise. Nenshi promised to instigate changes to improve the transparency of City Hall's municipal affairs as one of his 2010 campaign statements.

For his campaign platform, Nenshi proposed to abolish the $4,800 granted to home builders, aiming to save the city $33 million per annum. According to Nenshi, the subsidy over a decade contributed to the municipal debt of $1.5 billion. Nenshi wanted free market factors to take hold of the housing market and developers to contribute to funding infrastructure to far-reaching suburbs by paying levies. The Manning Centre for Building Democracy supported the motion as supporting free market principles. The group however believed developers should pay slightly increased taxes as long as inner city communities equally also contribute their share of growth costs.

In October 2013, Nenshi and Councillors Andre Chabot and Gian-Carlo Carra proposed to realize a 2008 plan by then-Mayor Dave Bronconnier to redevelop International Avenue (17th Ave SE) as a vital transportation hub. The plan incorporates a C-train line and rapid bus lanes, proposed in Calgary Transit's 'Route Ahead' plan. As well, the revitalization incorporates urban renewal projects like renovated apartments and business buildings. Carra studied the circumstances for Forest Lawn's urban decay and planned the neighbourhood's restoration as his master thesis.

Riding off of a wave of popularity, Nenshi won re-election in a landslide victory; he was sworn in weeks later.

==== 2017 election ====
During his first term, the length of council terms was extended from three years to four years. Nenshi indicated his intention to run for a 3rd term on November 4, 2016. On October 16, 2017, Nenshi won a third term winning over 50% of the vote, albeit with a smaller margin than his victory 4 years prior.

=== Tenure ===
==== Housing ====
Early in 2013, Nenshi's council suspended relations with the Calgary branch of the Canadian Home Builders' Association. The CHBA as a result was banned briefly from attending planning sessions. This action was conducted after the Calgary branch president Charron Ungar commented that the city was enacting a policy of "suburban freeze". Ungar commented upon a city plan which scheduled two suburb developments within 10 years.

As part of his election campaign, Nenshi advocated to legalize "secondary housing" as a solution to the housing shortage. A proposed bylaw was intended to create standardized safety requirements for the estimated 10,000–40,000 secondary suites which exist in the city. As one of the last decisions of Nenshi's term in 2013, the city motioned to waive the $4,485 application fee for rezoning of secondary suites.

In 2013, a video was leaked of Cal Wenzel, the CEO and founder of Shane Homes, speaking to a panel of Calgarian home builders about a plan to influence the decisions of the city council after the election. In the video, Wenzel spoke of plans to raise $1.1 million to enlist the support of Preston Manning's conservative foundation, the Manning Centre for Building Democracy. According to the speech, former Mayor Dave Bronconnier counselled Wenzel on how to control council motions with eight votes. "So for whatever and however, we have to ensure that we end up with the eight votes." Wenzel proposed a solution to circumvent confrontation with Nenshi's popularity. Wenzel named councillors the industry could rely on to support motions in favour of the lobby, which he supported with donations. Nenshi ordered a probe into what he described as possible violations of electoral laws. In late 2013, Wenzel filed a $6 million slander lawsuit against Nenshi, stating that his reputation was tarnished and that he was vilified as a subject of political opportunism during Nenshi and his allied councillor's campaigning. Wenzel stated that his comments in the video were taken out of context and manipulated by Nenshi to promote a political agenda. He also complained of Nenshi tentatively comparing him to 'Godfather', as a reference to the titular character of Mario Puzo's novel and screenplay The Godfather. Nenshi in an interview with David Gray, host of CBC Radio's Calgary Eyeopener, described the meeting as a scene from the film The Godfather. When asked to clarify if Wenzel were the "Godfather" in this analogy, Nenshi ambiguously responded "maybe". The two reached an out-of-court settlement in December 2015, under which Nenshi agreed to apologize for and retract several comments he had made, while Wenzel expressed regret for any harm done to Nenshi's reputation and agreed that Nenshi has raised legitimate concerns about the potential chilling effect of lawsuits against politicians. Nenshi's legal bill of nearly $300,000 was paid by donations.

==== Infrastructure and services ====
Soon after assuming office, Nenshi's council implemented many developments to revitalize Calgary's viability with capital infrastructure projects, such as the redevelopment of the East Village neighbourhood with the New Central Library and the National Music Centre. Funding for these projects were mainly drawn upon the Community Investment Fund, a fund created from tax revenue sources such as a $42 million annual refund from the provincial government.

The Nenshi administration completed capital public works projects approved by his predecessor Dave Bronconnier, including the westerly extension of the C-Train line, Peace Bridge, and the construction of a traffic tunnel to the Calgary International Airport. Although Nenshi's second-term council voted to end addition of fluoride to Calgary's drinking water, he supports water fluoridation.

Nenshi ordered a corruption graft probe into the finances of the city-owned utility company Enmax after an unknown senior employee revealed lavish spending by former Enmax CEO Gary Holden in 2010 in an email. Holden was reported to have organized extravagant house celebrations, entertained by rock stars, using municipal taxpayers' funds. Holden also gradually raised his salary from $700,000 to $2.7 million. Holden resigned in 2011 after CBC News revealed a business trip to Monaco in 2008. He violated Enmax ethics policy to disclose incidents of gifts over $100. Holden earned the 5th place distinction of Forbes top 10 CEO screw ups for 2010. By the terms of contract Holden was granted a significant severance pay of $4.6 million.

In 2011, Nenshi was present at the groundbreaking ceremony for Enmax's Shepard Energy Centre, a natural gas power plant capable of generating 800MW, more than half the electrical needs of Calgary. The facility was announced fully operational on March 11, 2015. The facility is described as Calgary's biggest project and cost $1.4 billion. The Shepard Energy Centre is connected to the Albertan power grid.

The Nenshi administration initiated many programs to improve civic administration and clarify transparency of city political affairs, organized around themes such as "transforming government" and "cutting red tape". These initiatives are intended to improve the business and quality of life for Calgarians. The Cutting red tape initiative was estimated to have saved Calgarians 33,000 in hours and $1.12 million in productivity. Nenshi sought the advice of Calgarians for further feedback and ideas of how to make city services easier to access in 2012 for its third phase of cutting red tape.

In 2013, the city council enacted a bylaw banning smoking in playgrounds and other places where family and children play.

In 2013, Nenshi supported the proposed Keystone XL pipeline network. He explained that opposition and protests were foolish as the pipe network could mitigate environmental damage caused from the transport of oil.

==== Transportation ====
The city constructed its first of many bicycle lanes in the downtown core during his tenure. By 2020, it was estimated that the city will have 30 km of cycle lanes.

In late 2013, the city has entered into speculative agreement with the Tsuu T'ina to resume negotiating the extension of Stoney Trail through a portion of Tsuu T'ina land for a ring road. The band members were to vote in a referendum in October of the same year to decide on the issue. The city was in negotiations for over 50 years, with the last proposal in 2009 being rejected. Nenshi described the proposal as "win-win-win", however, should the band decide to ratify the agreement, construction will not commence for two years. On October 24, 2013, Tsuu T'ina tribe members voted in a referendum to permit the construction of the ring road on their territory. In exchange for 450 hectares of land, the nation will be compensated with 2,150 hectares of Crown land to expand their territories. The nation will also receive $340 million.

Calgary Transit presented Nenshi's administration with the "RouteAhead" plan for review. The plan calls for $13 billion to be invested over 30 years to expand and upgrade Calgary Transit's capabilities. To address the problem of congestion of rush hour ridership, the city is upgrading busy C-train platforms to accommodate four-car trains. The city council approved $200 million for the acquisition of 60 new four-car trains to replace obsolete U2 units which served Calgary Transit since 1981. It is expected that the increased frequency of the trains will relieve crowded and full trains.

Nenshi abolished the $3 park-and-ride fees to encourage more commuters to use Calgary's Public Transit. Later, the decision was made to charge a $70 monthly fee for reserved parking.

==== 2026 Winter Olympics bid ====
Nenshi expressed intrigue at the prospect of the city hosting a second Winter Olympics in 2026 as Toronto announced its withdrawal from the 2024 Summer Olympics bid. Nenshi confirmed that he has met with a group of Calgarian citizens who were meeting to discuss proposing a bid. Nenshi adopted a "wait and see" policy while the group organized a detailed plan to the public.

In summer 2016, the city officially voted in favour of funding $5 million to the Calgary Bid Exploration Committee to report about the economic viability of hosting the 2026 Olympics.

Nenshi also vacationed in Rio during the 2016 Summer Olympics and discussed the prospects of Calgary hosting the 2026 Winter Olympics with IOC officials. According to Nenshi they were very receptive to the prospective bid.

The bid was withdrawn after a local referendum in which 56.4% of Calgary voters rejected the bid. Italy eventually won the hosting rights.

==== 2013 flood and reconstruction ====
Nenshi's rally to boost morale in the wake of a devastating flood that ravaged Southern Alberta in 2013 was well received by the press and Calgarians. He urged Calgarians to seek assistance for mental distress urged support for their neighbors mental and emotional well-being during the disaster recovery. Calgarian approval from his supporters has made him the subject of internet memes parodying him as Supermayor as 2013 Summer blockbuster movie Superman. His name was used as a verb for a parody of the British WWII morale slogan "Keep Calm and Carry On", as "Keep Calm and Nenshi On". The likeness of Nenshi wearing Scuba gear, was designed by Calgarian artist "Mandy Stobo" on T-shirts, to raise relief funds for the Red Cross.

Nenshi co-launched book published by the Calgary Herald entitled The Flood of 2013: A Summer of Angry Rivers in southern Alberta, which archived the paper's coverage of the flood. Proceeds from the book supported The Calgary Foundation's Flood Rebuilding Fund which helped victims most devastated.

Nenshi tasked former City transportation director Gordon Stewart with overseeing the reconstruction efforts. The flood caused an estimated $250 million in damages. Nenshi, commissioned a panel of engineering and environmental experts as well the community to recommend measures to mitigate damage from future floods.

==== City finances ====
The city implemented a 10-year plan to merge the business tax with the non-residential property tax. Until then Calgary was one of the last cities to have a stand-alone business tax.

Taxes began to rise before Nenshi's government as both the provincial and city governments have increased taxes since 2007 for several years and Mayor Dave Bronconnier commissioned civic work projects, such as C-train extension. Tax rates increased on average 5–10%/year for city taxes and 3–8%/year for provincial taxes. The increase in taxes was a source of frustration for many Calgarians over the years, especially after rising 33% during Nenshi's first three-year term, and an additional 14.37% property tax increase through three years of Nenshi's second four-year term in office.

Nenshi has encountered frustrations as his council finds it difficult to budget yearly with unsecured sources of provincial and federal funding. Nenshi, along with other Canadian mayors, rebuked the federal government for lack of capital funding for necessary projects such as transportation infrastructure projects such as public transit and improved highways as they have in the United States.

However, Nenshi together with Edmonton mayor Stephen Mandel attempted to negotiate with Premier Alison Redford to enact a charter to replace the decades-old ambiguous Municipal Act, to better define the roles of provincial and municipal governments. As the uncertain nature of non-municipal funding is unpredictable, Redford was forced to resort to austerity measures such as educational cutbacks early in her term.

Nenshi stated that taxes remained the lowest in Canada when compared to other major Canadian municipalities. However, during Nenshi's two terms in office, median property taxes were increased by 52% between 2010 and 2016.

In December 2013, Nenshi warned of prospective tax raises of 5% over the next four-year budget. He suggested that the best way to avoid or mitigate the increases was to implement a policy diversified sources of funding besides property taxes. Nenshi disfavours property tax as being unable to effectively collect revenue for capital civil works such as upgrading transportation. He favours a mixture of sources such as business taxes. Nenshi states that currently, only the province has the authority to enact legislation that fundamentally defines sources of revenue.

The city council asked Calgarians for their opinion on how to invest a $52 million surplus from an over-collection of property taxes. A debate was held in May 2013 and offered five options: return the money to Calgarians as a rebate, invest in revitalizing older neighbourhoods, improve Calgary Transit, reduction in taxes for businesses, and reduce the city's debt. A live debate inspired by the reality show "Dragon's Den" was held at the Devonian Gardens. In the wake of the devastating flood of 2013, the city council voted to implement Nenshi's proposal to use the surplus towards flood relief. However, the Canadian Taxpayer Federation warned that motion could become a permanent tax grab. That the money was intended to be returned to citizens.

During deliberations of the 2014 budget, the majority of the councillors voted in favour of returning the 2013 provincial $52 million tax refund.

==== Social issues ====
In 2011, Nenshi was grand marshal of Calgary Pride, the city's gay pride parade. He was the first mayor of Calgary to do so. In 2013 Nenshi proclaimed a "Trans Day of Visibility" as an awareness day for the challenges transgender and transsexual Calgarians face. Nenshi together with Albertan Premier Alison Redford who became the first Premier to Grand Marshal the parade, opened the 23rd Calgarian Pride parade. In his speech Nenshi addressed Québécois, inviting them to come to Calgary as the city did not discriminate. He criticized Quebec's proposed 'Charter of Quebec Values' legislature as contrary to the Canadian Charter of Rights and Freedoms.

In 2014, Nenshi delivered a speech to the Calgary Economic Development speakers' series on diversity. Nenshi explained that there was a lack of ethnic and gender diversity among senior city staff. Nenshi stated that although the city had an excellent record of hiring minorities and women, they may experience a ceiling to promotions and advancement.

In 2017, Calgary, as with many municipalities in Western Canada, recorded an increase in the number of overdoses and fatalities related to an opioid epidemic. During a conference of Canadian mayors, Nenshi invited the federal government to use Calgary as a test city to implement harm reductionist pilot projects and gather research unique to Calgary's needs. Nenshi presided over the 100th anniversaries of many important city institutions and traditions, including the Calgary Public Library, Calgary Stampede, Mount Royal University, and Calgary recreation. The city was assisted in preparations for these celebrations with a $1.6 million grant from the federal government.

During his tenure, the term alderman was changed to the gender-neutral councillor.

Soon after winning the 2013 mayoral elections, for the two-week duration of the 2014 Winter Olympics, Nenshi decided that city hall would fly the rainbow pride flag to protest the anti-LGBT stance of the Russian government.

In accordance with prime minister Justin Trudeau's 2015 campaign promise for reconciliation with the Indigenous people of Canada. The federal, provincial, and municipal governing bodies of Canada began the dialogue intended to redress the historical deficits and misgivings caused by centuries of abusive political inequalities. Calgary's city council commissioned its citizen-based aboriginal advisory board, the 'Calgary Aboriginal Urban Affairs Committee', to research social conditions and advise on an action plan to implement. The report entitled the 'White Goose Flying' report enacts on the Truth and Reconciliation Commission's (TRC) agreement to begin dialogue to redress the abuses of former residential school students; as well as acknowledge the inter-generational traumas of the human rights abuses suffered by aboriginals.

In 2017, the Langevin Bridge spanning the Bow River was voted to be renamed the Reconciliation Bridge to downtown Calgary after the public expressed misgivings about naming the structure after Sir Hector-Louis Langevin. He was a principal architect of the Residential School system.

In accordance with the federal and provincial gestures of reconciliation with First Nations communities, Nenshi presided with Native leaders in a drumming ceremony honouring the permanent raising of the flag of Treaty 7 along the provincial, national, and municipal flags outside city hall.

== Leader of the Alberta NDP (2024–present) ==
=== 2024 leadership campaign ===
After over a month of speculation, Nenshi announced his candidacy for the leadership of the Alberta NDP on March 11, 2024. Nenshi, who was not a member of the party, needed a special dispensation in order to stand for the leadership. He said being an NDP supporter on the prairies meant being more "pragmatic" and making sure that Albertans could see themselves within the party.

During the race, Nenshi campaigned on allowing provincial members to opt out of joining the federal NDP. Nearly a year later, the party members voted in favour.

He won the party leadership race on the first ballot with 62,746 votes (86%) on June 22, 2024, replacing former Premier Rachel Notley and becoming the party's ninth leader.

=== Tenure ===
Six months into his tenure as leader of the Alberta NDP, Nenshi said that his main priorities would be focusing on affordability, jobs, health care, public safety and education, feeling that the current United Conservative Party (UCP) government was not prioritizing them at all.

He faced his first electoral test as leader in the 2024 Lethbridge-West provincial by-election, which was won by the NDP's Rob Miyashiro. Nenshi chose not to run in the by-election. Instead, after Notley announced she was retiring from the legislature, Nenshi announced he would run in the by-election for her seat of Edmonton-Strathcona. On January 23, 2025, Nenshi was acclaimed as party's candidate for Edmonton-Strathcona, with no other party candidates stepping up to challenge him.

On May 3, 2025, Nenshi received 89.5 percent support in a leadership review vote during the party's provincial convention. Nenshi was elected as an MLA on June 23, with the Alberta NDP also retaining the seat of Edmonton-Ellerslie. On July 12, he was sworn in as MLA and was recognized as the leader of the Opposition.

A couple of days later, he alongside party MLAs, launched the 'Better Together Summer' plan as a way to counteract the UCP Alberta Next Panel. Nenshi explained the reason behind this tour was to hear from Albertans about their concerns and felt that Alberta Next was a distraction from the government's record on important issues.

On October 22, he appeared in the Alberta Legislature for the first time as the leader of the official opposition as part of the throne speech. He took part in his first question period a week later. During that time, Nenshi and his party put forth legislation on increasing the minimum wage, dealing with grocery prices, auto insurance, developing incentives to bring down electricity prices through investing in an electrical grid, whistleblower protections for health-care workers.

During the 2026 New Democratic Party leadership election campaign, he stated that he was not endorsing a candidate and said that he was not a member of the federal party. Following Avi Lewis's victory, Nenshi stated that his party believed in Alberta, supported Canadian energy such as supporting more pipelines, reducing emissions, supported public services and a "job-driven economy" to pay for it.

During the 2026 Alberta independence referendum campaign, the Alberta NDP won the 2026 Calgary-Shaw provincial by-election, gaining the seat from the UCP.

=== Views ===
==== Economy ====
Nenshi has written a couple of op-eds for the Calgary Herald. The first one was advocating for reforms to Bill C-59 that established by the federal government in 2024 and the other one is explaining how to position Alberta to deal with the US Canada Trade War in 2025.

In September 2025, Nenshi also criticized the UCP of clawing back from disabled Albertans their federal Canada Disability Benefit (CDP) by calling it theft. He also believed that Alberta need to diversify trade relationships for long-term economic stability and being less reliant on fluctuations in the oil and gas sector. In an end of the year interview with CBC, Nenshi disputed the UCP accusation that his party was going to raise taxes by saying that while it is important to keep taxes low and competitive it is more important to grow the economy.

==== Health care ====
After allegations surrounding the mismanagement of Alberta Health Services procurement contracts were reported, Nenshi advocated for a full public inquiry, an RCMP investigation, the dismissal of health minister Adriana LaGrange and backed former UCP cabinet minister Peter Guthrie's call for an immediate public judicial inquiry by arguing that the Smith government was trying to cover up the incident.

==== Energy and environment ====
Nenshi has criticized the consumer carbon tax implemented by Liberal government of Justin Trudeau by saying that they removed out home oil heating for political gain. He has also criticized UCP government for its seven-month moratorium on renewable energy projects in the province and wants to wait and see approach with the federal government before revealing his emission reduction plan. In October, Nenshi revealed that he believed that Alberta should be a leader in global progress in both energy markets and climate solutions, instead of acting as bystanders by backing the Pathways Alliance, carbon sequestration, and keep developing pipelines. Nenshi backed the memorandum of understanding between the government of Smith and Prime Minister Mark Carney to build an oil pipeline from Alberta to the British Columbia Coast on the condition that they worked with Indigenous communities to gain their support as well as the private sector.

==== Education ====
Nenshi views education as essential investment to Alberta's future prosperity. When the Alberta Teachers' Association (ATA) announced a teachers' strike as a result of multiple disagreements with Smith's government over the terms of a new labour contract, he said his party expressed sympathy to teachers and parents who are calling for more resources and smaller class sizes. During his first question period debate over the teacher strike, he invoked Peter Lougheed when asking Smith, why she abandoned "Lougheed’s dream of Alberta having the best public education system in the world?”.

==== Migration and labour ====
When criticizing the UCP for seeing an increase in unemployment numbers, he described the UCP support for manufacturing workers as "cosplay" and advocated for the government to work with them and their unions to make it easier for them into creating pathways for skilled trades. In addition, Nenshi advocated for Temporary Foreign Workers program to be re-evaluated by stating to it was not meant to create a class of exploited workers that do not have labor protections and social mobility.

==== Federalism ====
In an interview with Alberta Primetime, Nenshi criticized the Premier of Alberta Danielle Smith for inflaming discussions on Alberta separation by stating that it was deterring investment away from the province. In December 2025, Nenshi has told Don Braid of the Calgary Herald that Smith should put Thomas Lukaszuk’s Forever Canadian question to a vote in the legislature arguing that the threat of separation could go away. In January 2026, Nenshi took out an op-ed in CTV News warning that Alberta could have a separation referendum in 2026 . He warned that if this happens it can damage the economy like the Quebec separation movement did to Quebec and Brexit did to the United Kingdom. Nenshi believes Albertans are proud Canadians and that politicians and citizens in Canada, should not appease Smith but come together to make sure that Alberta should work for Canada.

== Outside politics ==
He appeared on the 2024 edition of Canada Reads, advocating for the illustrated novel Denison Avenue by Christina Wong and Daniel Innes.

=== Accolades ===
Nenshi and two other Canadian delegates won a Young Leader award by the World Economic Forum in 2011 for his innovative ideas of urban planning.

Nenshi was awarded the President's Award of the Canadian Institute of Planners in 2012, for implementing progressive ideas such as transparency.

Nenshi was ranked second most important person in Canada, next to Prime Minister Stephen Harper, by Maclean's magazine 50 top Canadians list for 2013.

On September 14, 2014, Nenshi was honoured by the Elder Pete Standing Alone of Kainai First Nation, Blood Tribe with the Blackfoot name, A'paistootsiipsii, meaning "Camp Moving Leader [Clan Leader]", or "he who moves the camp and others follow". The name signifies his leadership role for the people of Calgary.

Nenshi was awarded the World Mayor prize in 2014 by the City Mayors Foundation. He became the first Canadian mayor to win this award.

In 2017, Nenshi was awarded the 'Honorary Peace Patron' by the Mosaic Institute for contributions to strengthening the fabric of Canada.

== Electoral record ==
Alberta provincial by-election, June 23, 2025: Edmonton-Strathcona Resignation of Rachel Notley
Party	Candidate	Votes	%	±%
New Democratic	Naheed Nenshi	7,952	82.28	+2.55
United Conservative	Darby-Rae Crouch	1,314	13.60	-3.70
Liberal	Don Slater	195	2.02	–
Alberta Party	Samuel Petrov	115	1.19	–
Republican	Ravina Chand	65	0.67	+0.07 (Note: Change from the Buffalo Party, who rebranded to the Republican Party in 2025.)
Wildrose Loyalty Coalition	Jesse Stretch	24	0.25	-0.28
Total valid votes		9,665		
Total rejected ballots				
Turnout				
Eligible voters				
New Democratic hold		Swing		+3.13
Source(s) Source: Elections Alberta

2024 Alberta New Democratic Party leadership election
Candidate	Votes	%
Naheed Nenshi (X)	62,746	86.04
Kathleen Ganley	5,899	8.09
Sarah Hoffman	3,063	4.19
Jodi Calahoo Stonehouse	1,222	1.67

2017 Calgary mayoral election
Candidate	Votes	%
Naheed Nenshi (X)	199,122	51.41
Bill Smith	169,367	43.73
Andre Chabot	11,945	3.08
Curtis Olson	1,776	0.46
David Lapp	1,288	0.33
Emile Gabriel	1,258	0.32
Larry Heather	845	0.22
Stan the Man Waciak	664	0.17
Brent Chisholm	576	0.15
Jason Achtymichuk	465	0.12

2013 Calgary mayoral election
Candidate	Votes	%
Naheed Nenshi (X)	193,393	73.65
Jon Lord	56,226	21.41
Sandra Hunter	4,181	1.59
Carter Thomson	3,157	1.20
Larry R. Heather	1,857	0.71
Bruce Jackman	1,397	0.53
Norm Perrault	1,117	0.43
Jonathan Joseph Sunstrum	775	0.30
Milan Papez	492	0.19

2010 Calgary mayoral election
Candidate	Votes	%
Naheed Nenshi (X)	140,263	39.61
Ric McIver	112,386	31.74
Barb Higgins	91,359	25.80
Joe Connelly	2,484	0.70
Bob Hawkesworth*	1,513	0.43
Jon Lord	1,461	0.41
Wayne Stewart*	1,360	0.38
Craig Burrows*	994	0.28
Barry Erskine	672	0.19
Amanda Liu	336	0.095
Bonnie Devine	329	0.093
Sandra Hunter	284	0.08
Dan Knight	262	0.07
Oscar Fech	207	0.06
Gary F. Johnston	180	0.05

(Asterisk indicates candidate withdrew from the race but name remained on ballot)

== See also ==
- List of Harvard University politicians
