= Christina Wong =

Canadian writer

Christina Wong is a Canadian writer, most noted for her 2023 book Denison Avenue. The book, a collaboration with visual artist Daniel Innes, blends Wong's novella about an elderly Chinese Canadian widow navigating the rapidly changing Chinatown-Kensington district of Toronto, Ontario, with Innes's illustrations of scenes from the neighbourhoods.

The book was a shortlisted finalist for the 2024 Andrew Carnegie Medal for Excellence in Fiction, and was defended by Naheed Nenshi in the 2024 edition of Canada Reads.

Wong is also a playwright and artist, who has worked in sound art, audio documentaries and photography. Her plays have been staged at various theatres including the Factory Studio, Passe Muraille Backspace and the Palmerston Library Theatre, and she has created journalism and documentary work for TOK Magazine, the Toronto Star and Met Radio.

== Bibliography ==
=== Novel ===
- Denison Avenue (2023)

== Awards ==
Year	Title	Award	Category	Result	Ref.
2024	Denison Avenue	Andrew Carnegie Medal for Excellence	Fiction	Shortlisted	
2024	Denison Avenue	Canada Reads	—	Nominated	
