= Denison Avenue =

2023 Novel by Christina Wong

Denison Avenue is a 2023 novel by written by Christina Wong and illustrated by Daniel Innes. Using mixed media, the novel follows Wong Cho Sum, an elderly Chinese-Canadian widow, as she navigates the rapidly changing Chinatown-Kensington district of Toronto, Ontario following her husband's sudden and unexpected death.

On behalf of Booklist, Audrey Huang offered the novel a starred review and highlighted how the novel is "saturated with a sense of poignancy and grief". While calling the novel "multi-faceted" and "truly special", Huang praised "Innes’ detailed and beautiful hand-drawn illustrations" which serve as "eye-catching complements to Wong’s writing".

Denison Avenue was a shortlisted finalist for the 2024 Andrew Carnegie Medal for Excellence in Fiction and was defended by Naheed Nenshi in the 2024 edition of Canada Reads.
