= Daniel Innes (artist) =

Canadian artist

Daniel Innes is a Canadian artist, most noted for the 2023 book Denison Avenue. The book, a collaboration with writer Christina Wong, blends Wong's novella about an elderly Chinese Canadian widow navigating the rapidly changing Chinatown-Kensington district of Toronto, Ontario, with Innes's inked illustrations of scenes from the neighbourhoods.

The book was a shortlisted finalist for the 2024 Andrew Carnegie Medal for Excellence in Fiction, and was defended by Naheed Nenshi in the 2024 edition of Canada Reads.

He has also worked in painting, installation art, graphic and textile design, sign painting, and tattooing and lives in both Kamikawa, Hyogo Japan, and Toronto, Ontario Canada.

== Solo exhibitions ==
- 2019 Brittney Room and Other Paintings. The Embassy, 223 Augusta Avenue, Toronto, ON, Canada

== Group exhibitions ==
- 2013 Rock Art & the X-ray Style, organized by Ryan Foerster. 425 Oceanview Avenue, Brooklyn, NY, U.S.A.
- 2014 Another, Once Again, Many Times More, organized by Ryan Foerster. The Martos Gallery Summer Exhibition featuring several artists acting as curators, creating shows-within-the show. Invited by curator Bob Nickas. 12395 Main Road, East Marion, NY, U.S.A.
- 2017 Not Dead Yet Art Show. Faith / Void, 894A College Street, Toronto, ON, Canada
- 2018 Locals Only. Faith / Void, 894A College Street, Toronto, ON, Canada
- 2021 Anarchy of the Imagination, organized by Ryan Foerster. Kerry Schuss Gallery, 73 Leonard Street, New York, NY, U.S.A.

== Discography ==
- Excretion Greatest Hits (2001)
- Mature Situations - Cracked Pelvis EP (2009, Free Cake Records)
- Mature Situations - Old Hands EP (2010, Deranged Records)
