= Canada25 =

Canada25 was a non-profit and non-partisan organization that sought to facilitate the engagement of young people (primarily aged 20 to 30) in Canada on public policy issues. The organization was founded in 2001 by a small group of recent graduates of Queen's University who recruited other recent graduates. They organized an engagement forum that took place in May 2001 in Muskoka to discuss human capital flight (or 'brain drain'). The results of the forum and other research and consultation formed the basis of Canada25's first report A New Magnetic North: How Canada can Attract and Retain Talent (2001). The report concluded that to retain talented young Canadians, and attract global talent, the Canadian business, research and non-profit sectors, as well Canadian governments, must deliver on "a culture of innovation that begets challenging opportunities, celebrates success, and empowers individuals to fully utilize their skills and ideas" while at the same time creating "strong social orientation and a healthy cultural and physical environment" and ended with a series of recommendations.

The principal author of Canada25's second report was Naheed Nenshi, who would later become the mayor of Calgary. The report, titled Building Up: Making Canada's Cities Magnets for Talent and Engines of Development (2002), was the result of the group's national forum held near Victoria, BC, and their 11 regional roundtable meetings, all held in 2002. The topic built upon their first report's theme of attracting and retaining talent and applied it more narrowly to how that affects cities and . The report concludes that a young talented professionals tend to be attracted to cities that offer (1) high density, mixed-use cores, (2) social-cultural diversity and (3) discovery in terms of urban space and innovation.

The group's third report was titled From Middle to Model Power: Recharging Canada's Role in the World (2004). Based on another set of consultations, research and round table discussions, the report's principal author David Eaves noted that two defining events in recent Canadian history had transformed Canada's role in the world: first, the adoption of the Canadian Charter of Rights and Freedoms, highlighting the central role of individuals in Canada's political system. Second, the signing of the North American Free Trade Agreement, which cemented the role of markets and the economic decisions of individuals. These two events (and the socio-economic forces that they represented) had set the table for a profound rethinking of Canada's role in the world that went beyond traditional notions of statecraft. In other worlds, individual Canadians (acting unilaterally or as self-organizing groups) were now able to act as both the instruments and the influencers of Canadian foreign policy in a way that called for a rethink of the role of traditional foreign policy institutions such as diplomats and embassies. The chapter "Enhancing Global Markets", written by Nadim Kara, outlined how Canadian companies and consumers were reshaping Canada's role in the world, in both positive and negative ways, and called for a rethink of the role of government in both shaping and responding to the global impacts of these new foreign policy agents. The report also identifies Canadian military deployment strategy as erratic and calls for the federal government to establish transparent and predictable intervention criteria, as well as directing the military to establish a specialized expertise in postwar reconstruction.

Canada25's fourth, and what would be their final, published national policy report was Canadians and the Common Good: Building a Civic Nation Through Civic Engagement (2007). With Robin Rix as the principal author, the report was based on research and consultation done for the groups' 2006 national forum, held in Calgary, and 13 roundtable meetings of members, held in various location across North America. The report concluded with 20 policy recommendations around getting young people involved in civic life. Among the recommendations are events that celebrate the coming-of-age of youths (at the legal age of 18), increasing use of the Internet for elections, tax reform regarding contributions to non-profit organization, and revitalize public spaces and civic facilities.

Canada25 also completed dozens of regional projects on issues from healthcare to Kyoto to urban development including: Investing in the Next Alberta (2005); Cooling the Hot Air: Ratification of the Kyoto Protocol (2002); Batir pour l'avenir: A Montreal Renaissance (2002); Ripe With Potential: Vancouver as a Destination For Talent (2002) and Views From Young Talent in Winnipeg (2002).

In 2007, after six years of operations, Canada25 closed its doors due to a lack of a stable funding source.
