= Scotia Place =

Under construction arena in Alberta, Canada

- Interactive map of Scotia Place
- Former names: Calgary Event Centre (planning/construction)
- Location: Calgary, Alberta, Canada
- Coordinates: 51°02′23″N 114°03′08″W
- Owner: City of Calgary
- Operator: Calgary Sports and Entertainment Corporation
- Capacity: Hockey: 18,400
- Executive suites: 52
- Public transit: Victoria Park / Stampede

Construction
- Groundbreaking: July 22, 2024
- Cost: District improvements: $296.9 million Event Centre Block: $926.4 million Total: $1.223 billion
- Architects: Dialog; HOK
- Structural engineers: Entuitive; Thornton Tomasetti
- Main contractors: CANA; Mortensen

Tenants
- Calgary Flames (NHL) (2027–present); Calgary Hitmen (WHL) (2027–present); Calgary Roughnecks (NLL) (2027–present); Calgary Wranglers (AHL) (2027–present)

Scotia Place is a multi-purpose arena under construction in Calgary, Alberta, Canada. It is intended to replace the Scotiabank Saddledome as the home of the Calgary Flames of the National Hockey League. Construction began following the groundbreaking on July 22, 2024; the new arena is planned to open prior to the start of the 2027–28 NHL season.

== History ==
=== CalgaryNEXT ===
Scotia Place replaced a 2015 plan called CalgaryNEXT, which would have replaced both the Scotiabank Saddledome and McMahon Stadium for Calgary's professional hockey and Canadian football teams. That proposal included two buildings: a 19,000–20,000 seat events centre to serve as the new home arena of two hockey clubs, the National Hockey League's Calgary Flames, and the Calgary Hitmen of the Western Hockey League, as well as the Calgary Roughnecks lacrosse team; and a 40,000-seat football stadium and fieldhouse for the Canadian Football League's Calgary Stampeders and serve as a public training and activity space. The complex, originally planned to be located in West Village along the Bow River as a "hub of pro and amateur sporting activity."

Immediate reactions to the CalgaryNEXT proposal from local politicians were mixed; they supported the plan to redevelop the West Village area, but many – including Mayor Naheed Nenshi – expressed concern at the proposal, which would potentially have the city initially fund between $440 and $690 million of the projected cost which promoters claimed would be recouped over a long period of time. As part of the proposal, the facilities would be owned by the city and managed by the privately owned Calgary Sports and Entertainment Corporation (CSEC) - thus exempting the land from property taxes - but with the city not receiving any share of the profits.

Originally projected as costing $890 million, based on a City of Calgary report released in April 2016 it was estimated that CalgaryNEXT would cost approximately $1.8 billion, with taxpayers paying up to two-thirds of the total.

In April 2017, the Calgary city council voted unanimously to instead support an alternate plan located near the Saddledome.

=== New proposal ===
On September 12, 2017, Flames president and chief executive officer Ken King stated that the team was no longer pursuing the CalgaryNEXT arena, as "we've been working for a long time trying to come up with a formula that really works to replace this building and we really put our best foot forward and I've come to the conclusion sadly and I'm very disappointed that I don't think we can make a deal that works for us". Mayor Nenshi subsequently proposed a partnership wherein portions of the cost of "plan B" would be covered by the city, and the rest covered by the team ownership and user surcharges. King objected to this proposal.

On July 30, 2019, the Calgary city council approved a $550 million new Event Centre. The new arena was to be located to the north of the Saddledome in the Victoria Park neighbourhood. Construction on the building would have begun in 2021, and have a capacity of around 19,000. Plans for the Event Centre also included the possibility of a smaller arena to replace the Stampede Corral. The city of Calgary would have owned the Event Centre while CSEC would have been responsible for the facility's operation and maintenance, keeping all revenue under a 35-year lease agreement, which included a non-relocation clause for the Flames during that period. Had the project gone through, The Saddledome would have been demolished after the new arena opened.

On April 14, 2021, the deal for the new arena was put on hold by Calgary city council over budget concerns.

On July 26, 2021, the city announced the cost of the arena had gone from $550 million to $608.5 million. The arena was planned to utilize an "inverted bowl" design which may not have been feasible on the selected piece of land and posed accessibility concerns. As the project progressed further into design work, other potential problems were uncovered, resulting in cost overruns. To address these overruns, it was announced that both the City of Calgary and Calgary Sports and Entertainment Corporation would each be putting forward an additional $12.5 million, a clause agreed on in the deal signed in 2019. The Calgary Sports and Entertainment Corporation then agreed to cover any potential future overruns. Additionally, the city announced as part of the updated deal with CSEC that the Calgary Municipal Land Corp. (CMLC) would be removed as project manager and replaced with an organization of CSEC's choosing.

On December 22, 2021, the former mayor of Calgary Jyoti Gondek shared on social media that CSEC was pulling out of the deal, citing disagreements in new costs that the city wanted CSEC to cover a portion of. These overruns included infrastructure costs of $12.1 million and climate mitigation costs of $4 million, with the city offering to cover $6.4 million of the total, leaving $9.7 million to be paid by CSEC. These costs were not previously identified as project costs by CMLC or the City nor were they included in the $608.5 million budget from July 2021. Despite this, CSEC stated their intention on remaining in the Saddledome.

=== Final deal ===
On April 25, 2023, a press conference was held in regards to an update surrounding the Calgary Events Centre. It was announced that an updated project on the same site, now estimated to cost $1.22 billion, would be moving forward including a planned arena, indoor rink, and indoor and outdoor plazas. The city is to pay $537.3 million up front, with the Flames ownership paying a total of $748.3 million over 35 years (estimated to be $356 million in 2024 dollars) and the province of Alberta paying $330 million over three years to cover a community rink, some infrastructure costs and the demolition of the Saddledome.

On October 5, 2023, the City of Calgary, Province of Alberta, and CSEC announced that they had finalized agreements for the new event centre and district improvements.

On July 22, 2024, the design and final name of the arena, Scotia Place, was announced at a groundbreaking ceremony, with construction beginning shortly after.
