= Allan Markin =

Canadian businessman (born 1945)

- Born: Allan Paul Markin; 6 May 1945 (age 80); Calgary, Alberta, Canada
- Education: University of Alberta (BSc 1968)
- Occupations: Chemical engineer and businessman
- Known for: Co-owner of the Calgary Flames

Allan Paul Markin OC AOE (born 6 May 1945) was the chairman of Canadian Natural Resources Limited and is a co-owner of the Calgary Flames ice hockey franchise of the National Hockey League based in Calgary, Alberta, Canada.

== Education and career ==
Markin is a chemical engineer, having graduated with a Bachelor of Science degree from the University of Alberta in 1968. He has also received honorary degrees from the University of Alberta, University of Calgary, University of Lethbridge and St. Francis Xavier University.

He held positions in senior management with Merland Exploration (Executive VP, 1975 to 1981) and Helton Engineering (Owner and vice-president, 1971 to 1974) before joining Calgary's Poco Petroleum as president and chief executive officer (1982 to 1988). In 1989, together with N. Murray Edwards, Markin co-founded and became chairman of the Board of Canadian Natural Resources Limited. He resigned as the Chairman of CNRL on April 2, 2012, which may have been triggered with his involvement with Pure North S'Energy Foundation. He is now the Chief Accountability Officer at Pure North S'Energy Foundation, a non-profit charitable foundation.

He became a co-owner of the Calgary Flames in 1994.

== Philanthropy ==
He is one of the founders, with a cumulative contribution of $23.3 million, to St. Mary's University College and was named an Honorary Fellow in 2004. Commencing in 1992, the Allan P. Markin Engineering Entrance Awards give out 150 scholarships of $1,000 each at the University of Alberta. Markin and CNRL were major donors of $3 million each to the University of Alberta's Markin/CNRL Natural Resources Engineering Facility opened in October 2004. Markin has also provided funds to the University of Alberta to set up a Research Chair in Nutrition and Disease Prevention. On September 16, 2004, he donated the largest gift in the history of the University of Calgary – $18 million – to allow the university to establish the Institute for Public Health. He also contributed $3 million to the University of Calgary to create the Markin Chair in Health and Society, and supports the Markin Undergraduate Student Research Program in Health & Wellness. In 2005, he made a large contribution to the Legacy of Leadership campaign at the University of Lethbridge. His donation, combined with early private funding and corporate and government support, facilitated construction of Markin Hall in 2008, which houses the Faculty of Management and Faculty of Health Sciences. On April 13, 2006, he matched CNRL's donation of $500,000 to help Northern Lights College open their new Centre of Excellence in Fort St. John. In 2009, he donated over a million dollars to St. Francis Xavier University's Coady International Institute, which helps educate students from developing nations to become leaders and make a meaningful difference in their communities. In addition, since 2007, Markin has provided over $16 million in funding to a health promotion project called A Project Promoting healthy Living for Everyone in Schools (known as APPLE Schools) to help schools be healthy places that support students to form lifelong healthy habits. APPLE serves 16,500 children in 63 Northern Alberta schools, including schools serving First Nations' populations. He has also provided financial support to the Barbara and Myer Horowitz Library Endowment Fund, Augustana University College, and Keyano College.

In 2007, he founded Pure North S'Energy Foundation, a company that provides and promotes alternative health treatments, such as high-dose vitamins and minerals, lifestyle counselling, and treatments purported to remove heavy metals from participants' blood. Pure North was started as a health program for CNRL employees, although CNRL eventually withdrew the health program from its employee benefits plan. In 2013, the Pure North S'Energy Foundation was given a $10 million grant from the province of Alberta to defray the costs of providing free health prevention and management services to seniors. The Albertan health minister at the time, Fred Horne, approved the funding against the advice of officials from several ministries who had determined the program was not adequately supported by scientific evidence, could not prove the health and economic benefits it claimed, and could cause adverse health effects in participants. In a 2017 CBC investigation, many irregularities with the funding were identified including lack of details in the project plan, change in the scope of the project to not require an independent approval from a research ethics board, the speed and method that payment was provided, and lack of concern over provincial liability with the project. Alberta Health reviewed this grant and concluded there was no convincing data to support the cost-saving claims the program was making. In April 2016, University of Calgary economist J.C. Herbert Emery, in a Pure North S'Energy funded paper, calculated that for every dollar spent by seniors in their second year in the Pure North program, there was an estimated benefit of $2.36 in reduced hospitalization and ambulatory care, increases in Quality Adjusted Life Years, as well as improved productivity.

Pure North S'Energy also donated $6 million, and provided supplement and lab testing services to, Biocybernaut's Canadian Aboriginal Scholarship Program. Under this program the Prince Albert School Study, a controversial study testing neurofeedback training methods on schoolchildren, was conducted.

In 2016, Pure North received $4.2 million, along with three other agencies that serve the homeless, addicted, seniors and other under-served populations, to undertake a pilot project using nurse practitioners to deliver health services.

In 2018, it was revealed that Markin was a substantial donor to the fund which paid the ransom to release Amanda Lindhout from her Somalian captors.

Other organizations that have benefitted from Markin's community leadership include the United Way ($5.7 million) and the Nature Conservancy of Canada. Further afield, he has given valued support to organizations such as World Vision Canada, the Sri Narayani Foundation in India for the Education of Children, and programs for children in Chinese Tibet and the Coady International Institute at St. Francis Xavier University.

== Awards ==
- 1991, 1992, 1993, 1995 – Wall Street Transcript Chief Executive Officer Award; Canadian Oil / Jr. Producers Industry Award | 1991, Bronze; 1992, Silver; 1993, Gold; 1995, Silver
- 1993 – Pinnacle Award of Business Excellence in Alberta
- 1993 – Oilweek Producer of the Year Award
- 1998 – Honorary degree of Doctorate of Laws from the University of Calgary
- 1998 – Wall Street Journal Gold Award for Outstanding Achievement - Canadian Oil Producers
- 2002 – Honorary degree of Doctorate of Laws from the University of Alberta
- 2002 – Faculty Association Recognition Award, University of Calgary
- 2004 – Calgary Citizen of the Year
- 2004 – Honorary Fellowship of St. Mary's University, Calgary
- 2005 – Alberta Centennial Medal
- 2006 – Honorary degree of Doctorate of Laws from the University of Lethbridge
- 2007 – EducationMatters and the Calgary Board of Education Distinguished Alumni Award
- 2008 – Officer of the Order of Canada
- 2008 – Alberta Order of Excellence
- 2009 – Calgary Business Hall of Fame Laureate
- 2009 – Honorary Doctorate of Laws from St. Francis Xavier University
- 2010 – Fraser Institute T. Patrick Boyle Founders Award
- 2012 – University of Alberta School of Business, 31st Canadian Business Leader of the Year Award
- 2012 – Western Legacy Award, Calgary Stampede Centennial 100 Outstanding Albertans
- 2012 – Queen Elizabeth II Diamond Jubilee Medal for outstanding service and citizenship
- 2014 – Northern Lights College, Honorary Associate of Arts Degree
- 2018 – The Mustard Seed Golden Dove Award for “exceptional support for the most vulnerable in our community.”
