= Calgary Sports and Entertainment =

Canadian company formed 2012

Calgary Sports and Entertainment Corporation
- Type: Private
- Industry: Sports, Property management
- Founded: 1980 (as Calgary Flames Limited Partnership); 2012 (reorganized as CSEC)
- Headquarters: Calgary, Alberta
- Key people: N. Murray Edwards, Chairman; Robert Hayes, CEO
- Products: Professional sports teams, Arenas
- Owner: N. Murray Edwards; Allan Markin; Jeffrey McCaig
- Subsidiaries: Calgary Flames; Calgary Hitmen; Calgary Stampeders; Calgary Roughnecks; Calgary Wranglers; Scotiabank Saddledome

The Calgary Sports and Entertainment Corporation (CSEC) is a privately owned professional sports and entertainment company based in Calgary, Alberta, Canada formed in 2012 and owned by N. Murray Edwards, Allan Markin, Jeffrey McCaig, Clay Riddell.

It succeeded the Calgary Flames Limited Partnership (CFLP), which represented the group that has owned the Calgary Flames of the National Hockey League (NHL) since 1980. CFLP subsequently acquired ownership of the Calgary Hitmen of the Western Hockey League (WHL), the Calgary Roughnecks of the National Lacrosse League (NLL), the Calgary Stampeders of the Canadian Football League (CFL), and the Calgary Wranglers of the American Hockey League (AHL). The group also manages the Scotiabank Saddledome arena in Calgary. It formerly owned the Adirondack Thunder of the ECHL until selling it to a local ownership group. CSEC is privately owned by the six owners that formed the CFLP, minus Clay Riddell, who died in 2018, and is chaired by N. Murray Edwards. Ken King was the chief executive officer until his death in 2020.

== Assets ==
Calgary Sports and Entertainment owns and operates five franchises based in Calgary including the Flames' minor league affiliate, the Calgary Wranglers. Additionally, CSEC has a management agreement with the City of Calgary to operate the Scotiabank Saddledome arena which serves as the home venue of the Flames, Hitmen and Roughnecks. In August 2015, the CSEC proposed a new multi-purpose sports venue in Calgary.

Team	League	Founded	Owned since
Calgary Flames	National Hockey League	1972, as the Atlanta Flames	May 21, 1980
Calgary Hitmen	Western Hockey League	1995	June 1997
Calgary Roughnecks	National Lacrosse League	2001	June 2011
Calgary Stampeders	Canadian Football League	1945	March 2005 (minority stake); March 2012 (controlling interest)
Calgary Wranglers	American Hockey League	1977, as the Maine Mariners	1993
