= Persistent edema of rosacea =

- Other names: Persistent oedema of rosacea
- Specialty: Dermatology

Persistent edema of rosacea (also known as chronic upper facial erythematous edema, Morbihan's disease or rosaceous lymphedema) is a hard, nonpitting edema found on the areas involved, those mainly being the forehead, glabella, upper eyelids, nose, and/or cheeks.

== Signs and symptoms ==
Persistent edema of rosacea is an uncommon cutaneous condition characterized by a hard, nonpitting edema restricted to the forehead, glabella, upper eyelids, nose, and cheeks. This condition is also known as chronic upper facial erythematous edema, Morbihan's disease, morbus Morbihan, and rosaceous lymphedema. Despite the name, it is unclear whether this condition is a distinct disease or a rare complication of rosacea. Generally, there are few symptomatic complaints aside from redness and facial contour changes. The edema typically worsens slowly over months to years and is often on a background of chronic inflammation.

== Diagnosis ==
There are no specific laboratory findings associated with this condition, and the histology tends to be similar to that seen in rosacea. The differential diagnosis includes acne vulgaris, streptococcal cellulitis, and Melkersson–Rosenthal syndrome, as these conditions can also rarely manifest with a similar edema, as well as other forms of rosacea,' lupus erythematosus, and sarcoidosis.

== Treatment ==
Most cases of this condition tend to be recalcitrant to treatment, with topical and oral antibiotic regimens commonly used for rosacea generally being ineffective. For the severe forms of this disease, oral isotretinoin therapy has been used, and the condition responds well to doses of 0.5 to 1 mg/kg/day. However, unlike in the treatment of acne vulgaris, lasting responses to isotretinoin generally do not occur, and long-term maintenance therapy with oral tetracyclines is usually necessary. Eyelid reduction surgery has also been reported to help with the cosmetic appearance of the condition, but does not alter the disease progression.

== See also ==
- List of cutaneous conditions
