= List of neighbourhoods in Calgary =

This is a list of neighbourhoods in Calgary, Alberta.

As of 2016, Calgary has 197 neighbourhoods, which are referred to as "communities" by the municipal government, and 42 industrial areas. A further 15 communities were included in the civic censuses from 2015 to 2019, bringing the total to 212. Calgary Open Data also confirms six more communities yet to be developed (Alpine Park, Ambleton, Glacier Ridge, Lewisburg, TwinHills, and Symons Valley Ranch).

== Centre City ==
The area collectively known as the Centre City comprises Downtown (including the Downtown West End and Downtown East Village) and the adjacent neighbourhoods of Eau Claire, Chinatown, and the Beltline (including Connaught and Victoria Park).

Within Centre City, those neighbourhoods below that have an area redevelopment plan (ARP) in effect are indicated with "ARP" in parentheses.

=== Downtown ===
Downtown Calgary is bordered by 11th Street W. on the west, 3rd Avenue S. and the Bow River on the north, the Elbow River on the east and the CPR mainline tracks on the south.

Downtown neighbourhoods:

- Downtown West End
- Downtown Commercial Core
- Downtown East Village

Unofficial districts:

- Stephen Avenue Retail Core
- Entertainment District
- Government District

=== Other ===
The remaining Centre City neighbourhoods are predominantly residential and mixed-use. These areas are often considered to be an extension of downtown. Other Centre City neighbourhoods include:

- Beltline — is physically separated from downtown proper by the CPR mainline tracks, and is the densest and most populous neighbourhood in Calgary. It comprises the former neighbourhoods of Connaught on the west and Victoria Park on the east.
- Chinatown
- Eau Claire

== Inner city ==
The inner city includes Downtown Calgary and the adjoining communities, and overlays roughly the city limits before 1961. It is delimited by Sarcee Trail to the west; Glenmore Reservoir and Glenmore Trail to the south; Bow River and Deerfoot Trail to the east; and Bow River and 32 Avenue to the north.

The inner city includes the following neighbourhoods (by city quadrant):

Quadrant	Neighbourhoods
NE	Bridgeland/Riverside, Crescent Heights, Mayland Heights, Renfrew, Tuxedo Park, Vista Heights, Winston Heights/Mountview
NW	Banff Trail, Bowness, Citadel, Crescent Heights, Capitol Hill, Hamptons, Hillhurst, Hounsfield Heights/Briar Hill, Montgomery, Mount Pleasant, Parkdale, Point Mckay, Rosedale, Rosemont, St. Andrews Heights, Sunnyside, Tuxedo Park, University Heights, University of Calgary, West Hillhurst
SW	Altadore, Bankview, Bel-Aire, Britannia, Cliff Bungalow, Currie Barracks, Lincoln Park, Connaught (district in Beltline), Elbow Park, Elboya, Erlton, Garrison Green, Garrison Woods, Glamorgan, Glenbrook, Glendale, Killarney/Glengarry, Lower Mount Royal, Manchester, Mayfair, Meadowlark Park, Mission, North Glenmore Park, Parkhill/Stanley Park, Richmond, Rideau Park, Rosscarrock, Roxboro, Rutland Park, Scarboro, Scarboro/Sunalta West, Shaganappi, South Calgary, Spruce Cliff, Sunalta, Upper Mount Royal, Westgate, Wildwood, Windsor Park
SE	Albert Park/Radisson Heights, Alyth/Bonnybrook, Burns Industrial, Dover, Erin Woods, Forest Heights, Forest Lawn, Highfield Industrial, Inglewood, Manchester, Manchester Industrial, Ogden Shops, Ogden, Ramsay, Southview, Victoria Park (district in Beltline)

== Quadrants ==
Calgary is divided into four geographic quadrants generally described below.

- Northwest Calgary – west of a combination of Centre Street/Harvest Hills Boulevard and north of a combination of the Bow River, Sarcee Trail, Memorial Drive, and Highway 1 (Trans-Canada Highway)
- Northeast Calgary – east of a combination of Centre Street//Harvest Hills Boulevard and north of a combination of the Bow River, a Canadian Pacific Kansas City rail line, Centre Avenue and Memorial Drive
- Southwest Calgary – south of a combination of the Bow River, Sarcee Trail and Highway 1 (Trans-Canada Highway) and west of a combination of Centre Street, a Canadian Pacific Kansas City rail line, Macleod Trail and Sheriff King Street
- Southeast Calgary – south of a combination of the Bow River, a Canadian Pacific Kansas City rail line, Centre Avenue and Memorial Drive and east of a combination of Centre Street, a Canadian Pacific Kansas City rail line, Macleod Trail and Sheriff King Street

== List ==
The following is a list of all neighbourhoods within the City of Calgary including residential communities, industrial areas, major parks and residual areas by electoral ward.

Name	Quadrant	Sector	Ward 2021	Type	Founded	Population (2021)	Population (2011)	Dwellings (2012)	Area (km^{2})	Population density	Notes
Abbeydale	NE/SE	Northeast	10	Residential	1976	5925	5,700	2,023	1.7	3,480.6	Very small section falls into the SE
Acadia	SE	South	11	Residential	1960	9915	10,615	5,053	3.9	2,744.9	
Albert Park/Radisson Heights	SE	East	9	Residential	1910	6740	6,217	2,709	2.5	2,493.6	Commonly confused with Forest Lawn
Altadore	SW	Centre	8	Residential	1945	7290	8,907	4,486	2.9	3,143.4	
Alpine Park	SW		13								
Alyth/Bonnybrook	SE	Centre	9	Industrial		0	17	14	3.8	4.2	
Applewood Park	SE/NE	East	9	Residential	1982	6830	6,404	2,215	1.6	4,061.3	
Arbour Lake	NW	Northwest	2	Residential	1992	10335	10,762	3,918	4.4	2,462.7	Sometimes referred to as Crowfoot
Aspen Woods	SW	West	6	Residential	2001	9435	4,469	2,281	3.8	1,387.1	
Auburn Bay	SE	Southeast	12	Residential	2005	18090	5,769	2,808	4.5	1,598.4	
Aurora Business Park	NE	North		Industrial			0	0	2.4	0	
Banff Trail	NW	Centre	7	Residential	1952	3805	3,582	1,950	1.5	2,558	
Bankview	SW	Centre	8	Residential	1908	5125	4,754	3,528	0.7	7,458.6	
Bayview	SW	South	11	Residential		675	648	249	0.4	1,705	
Beddington Heights	NW/NE	North	4	Residential		11295	11,457	4,348	3.2	3,620.3	
Bel-Aire	SW	Centre	11	Residential	1960	400	449	159	0.3	1,413.3	
Belmont			13			800					
Beltline	SW/SE	Centre	8	Residential		25880	19,556	14,456	2.9	6,786.6	Created as a merger between the neighborhoods of Connaught and Victoria Park
Belvedere	SE	East	9		2013						Sometimes referred to as East Hills
Bonavista Downs	SE	South		Residential	1973	830	947	370	0.5	1,850	
Bowness	NW	Northwest	1	Residential	1896	10770	10,700	5,313	5.6	1,966.4	
Braeside	SW	South	11	Residential	1965	5700	5,978	2,544	2	2,970	
Brentwood	NW	Northwest	2	Residential	1960	7410	6,049	2,595	2.9	2,089.3	
Bridgeland/Riverside	NE/SE	Centre	9	Residential	1908	6350	5,254	3,274	3.1	1,804.5	
Bridlewood	SW	South	13	Residential	1997	12545	11,641	4,200	3.2	3,698.4	
Britannia	SW	Centre	8	Residential	1956	765	746	309	0.5	1,606	
Burns Industrial	SE	Centre		Industrial			11	2	2.9	0	
Calgary International Airport	NE	Northeast	5	Industrial			0	4	20.6	0	
Cambrian Heights	NW	Centre	4	Residential		2000	2,039	930	0.9	2,287.8	
Canada Olympic Park	SW	West	6	Major Park			0	0	0.9	0	
Canyon Meadows	SW	South		Residential	1965	7435	7,895	3,195	3.1	2,511.9	
Capitol Hill	NW	Centre	7	Residential	1948	4670	4,003	2,291	1.4	2,867.9	
Carrington	NW	North		Residential		2750					
Castleridge	NE	Northeast	5	Residential	1980	6130	6,098	1,954	1.2	5,080	
Cedarbrae	SW	South	11	Residential	1973	5935	6,264	2,609	2.1	2,970	
Chaparral	SE	South		Residential	1995	12500	11,151	3,759	5.4	2,139.3	
Charleswood	NW	Northwest	4	Residential	1959	3595	3,357	1,494	1.8	1,900.6	
Chinatown	SW/SE	Centre	7	Residential		2250	1,269	1,381	0.179	7,885	
Chinook Park	SW	South	11	Residential	1959	1535	1,703	589	0.6	2,845	
Christie Park	SW	West	6	Residential	1993	1880	2,180	728	0.8	2,745	
Citadel	NW	Northwest		Residential		10180	10,171	3,479	2.7	3,776.7	
Cityscape	NE	Northeast	5	Residential		5085					
Cliff Bungalow	SW	Centre	8	Residential		1805	1,912	1,377	0.243	4,840	
Coach Hill	SW	West	6	Residential		3275	3,194	1,480	1.1	2,980.9	
Collingwood	NW	Northwest	4	Residential		2290	2,231	978	1.6	1,388.8	
Copperfield	SE	Southeast		Residential		14095	7,162	3,043	4.4	1,780.5	
Coral Springs	NE	Northeast	10	Residential		5610	5,838	1,508	1.8	3,260	
Cougar Ridge	SW	West	6	Residential		7150	5,813	1,908	2.2	2,670	
Country Hills	NW	North	3	Residential		3660	3,720	1,426	1.9	1,962.1	
Country Hills Village	NE	North	3	Residential		2480	2,342	1,467	1	2,615	Sometimes referred to as North Pointe
Coventry Hills	NE	North	3	Residential		17350	15,722	5,322	4.1	3,894.9	
Cranston	SE	Southeast		Residential	2000	20850	10,831	4,625	8.3	1,428.6	
Crescent Heights	NE/NW	Centre	7	Residential		6240	5,895	3,614	1.6	3,919.4	
Crestmont	SW	West		Residential		2275	1,430	462	0.6	2,423.3	
Currie	SW	West		Residential		1275	24	76	1.1	156.4	
Dalhousie	NW	Northwest	4	Residential		8530	8,917	3,739	3.3	2,753	
Deer Ridge	SE	South		Residential		3795	3,991	1,501	1.4	2,917.1	
Deer Run	SE	South		Residential		4910	5,390	2,113	1.9	2,811.1	
Deerfoot Business Centre	NE	Northeast		Industrial			0	0	2	0	
Diamond Cove	SE	South		Residential		625	716	271	0.5	1,398	
Discovery Ridge	SW	West	6	Residential		4330	4,321	1,649	3.6	1,208.3	
Douglasdale/Glen	SE	Southeast		Residential		12920	11,768	4,217	6.4	1,857.8	
Dover	SE	East		Residential		10795	10,302	4,722	4.2	2,493.8	
Downtown Commercial Core	SW/SE	Centre		Residential		8225	8,071	5,121	1.3	6,165.4	
Downtown East Village	SE	Centre		Residential		3140	2,747	1,230	0.5	5,564	Sometimes referred to as the East Village
Downtown West End	SW	Centre		Residential		2825	2,483	1,628	0.4	5,805	
Eagle Ridge	SW	South	11	Residential		260	443	110	0.4	1,037.5	
East Fairview Industrial	SE	South		Industrial			0	1	2.3	0	
East Shepard Industrial	SE	Southeast		Industrial			0	0	17.4	0	
Eastfield	SE	East		Industrial			0	0	1.1	0	
Eau Claire	SW	Centre	7	Residential	1885	1875	1,711	1,328	0.5	3,702	
Edgemont	NW	Northwest	4	Residential		15225	16,082	5,421	6.6	2,408.8	
Elbow Park	SW	Centre	8	Residential		3285	3,408	1,221	1.8	1,876.1	
Elboya	SW	Centre	8	Residential		1835	1,747	783	0.7	2,445.7	
Erin Woods	SE	East		Residential		6790	6,794	2,453	1.6	4,313.1	
Erlton	SW/SE	Centre		Residential		1280	1,231	742	0.5	2,468	
Evanston	NW	North		Residential		18710	5,889	2,576	4.9	1,345.7	
Evergreen	SW	South		Residential		20780	19,487	6,961	4.6	4,371.7	
Fairview	SE	South		Residential		3675	3,552	1,606	1.3	2,786.9	
Fairview Industrial	SE	South		Industrial			0	2	1.3	0	
Falconridge	NE	Northeast	5	Residential		10325	10,043	3,478	2.2	4,718.6	
Fish Creek Park	SE/SW	South	12/13/14	Major Park		430	0	0	15.6	0	
Foothills Industrial	SE	East		Industrial			326	2	7.6	39.2	
Forest Heights	SE	East	9	Residential		5985	6,185	2,221	1.5	4,141.3	Commonly confused with Forest Lawn
Forest Lawn	SE	East	9	Residential		7230	7,313	3,352	2.3	3,255.2	
Forest Lawn Industrial	SE	East	9	Industrial			120	63	1.5	86.7	Sometimes referred to as Hubalta
Franklin	NE/SE	Northeast	10	Industrial			0	3	1.5	0	
Garrison Green	SW	West	11	Residential		1680	6,242	2,988	2	3,188	Formerly a part of Lincoln Park
Garrison Woods	SW	West	8			2860					Formerly a part of Altadore
Glacier Ridge	NW										
Glamorgan	SW	West	6	Residential		6575	6,242	2,988	2	3,188	
Glenbrook	SW	West	6	Residential		7240	6,893	3,247	1.9	3,713.7	
Glendale	SW	West	6	Residential		2715	2,730	1,111	1.4	1,963.6	
Glendeer Business Park	SE	South		Industrial			0	0	0.3	0	
Glenmore Park	SW	West		Major Park			0	3	10.2	0	
Golden Triangle	SE	East		Industrial			0	1	0.5	0	
Great Plains	SE	East		Industrial			0	0	4.3	0	
Greenview	NE	North		Residential		2100	1,956	1,120	0.5	3,950	
Greenview Industrial Park	NE	North		Industrial			0	5	2.1	0	
Greenwood/Greenbriar	NW	Northwest		Residential			932	501	1.2	788.3	
Hamptons	NW	Northwest		Residential		7360	7,843	2,471	3.5	2,258.6	
Harvest Hills	NE	North	3	Residential		7805	7,485	2,569	2.2	3,364.5	
Hawkwood	NW	Northwest		Residential		9115	9,898	3,331	3.2	3,072.2	
Haysboro	SW	South	11	Residential		6960	6,724	3,637	2.7	2,571.5	
Hidden Valley	NW	North		Residential		11540	11,657	3,867	4.3	2,744	
Highfield	SE	Centre	9	Industrial			0	0	2.7	0	
Highland Park	NW/NE	Centre		Residential		4105	3,539	2,123	1.4	2,708.6	
Highwood	NW	Centre		Residential		2205	2,098	993	0.9	2,460	
Hillhurst	NW	Centre		Residential		5475	5,914	3,557	2.1	2,995.7	
Horizon	NE	Northeast	10	Industrial			74	4	2.3	13.5	Commonly referred to as Whitehorn
Hotchkiss	SE	Northeast		Residential							
Hounsfield Heights/Briar Hill	NW	Centre		Residential		2470	2,927	1,109	1.2	2,461.7	Sometimes referred to as North Hill
Huntington Hills	NW/NE	North		Residential		13120	13,279	5,580	4.8	2,752.7	
Huxley			9								
Inglewood	SE	Centre		Residential		4130	3,473	2,241	2.5	1,425.6	
Kelvin Grove	SW	South		Residential		1805	2,334	903	0.8	2,928.8	
Keystone Hills			3								
Killarney/Glengarry	SW	Centre		Residential		7920	6,543	3,679	1.8	3,786.7	
Kincora	NW	North		Residential		7030	4,625	1,548	2.3	2,120	
Kingsland	SW	South		Residential		4900	4,418	2,383	1.3	3,471.5	
Lake Bonavista	SE	South		Residential		10145	10,610	4,106	5.2	2,014.4	
Lakeview	SW	West		Residential		5640	5,501	2,338	2.2	2,485.5	
Legacy	SE	South		Residential		8000	11	0	6.1	0	Located within Calgary City Council's Ward 14; home to All Saints High School, with a student population capacity of 1,500.
Lincoln Park	SW	West		Residential		1590	2,501	1,413	1.5	1,670	
Livingston	NW/NE	North	3	Residential	2017	3985			4.85		Ongoing development, estimated population of 30k when complete.
Lower Mount Royal	SW	Centre		Residential		2990	2,981	2,266	0.3	10,600	
MacEwan Glen	NW	North		Residential		4740	5,138	1,781	1.4	3,642.9	
Mahogany	SE	Southeast		Residential		13860	788	572	6.4	197.8	
Manchester	SE/SW	Centre		Residential		950	669	448	0.5	1,236	
Manchester Industrial	SE/SW	Centre		Industrial		0	0	3	4.6	0	Not to be confused with Manchester
Maple Ridge	SE	South		Residential		1830	1,978	811	2.8	682.1	
Marlborough	NE	Northeast	10	Residential		8910	8,310	3,123	2.7	3,123.7	
Marlborough Park	NE	Northeast	10	Residential		8290	8,278	3,050	2.5	3,356.4	
Martindale	NE	Northeast	5	Residential		14540	12,987	3,912	2.7	5,064.4	
Mayfair	SW	Centre		Residential		410	470	156	0.3	1,603.3	
Mayland	SE/NE	Northeast	10	Industrial		0	0	1	1.2	0	
Mayland Heights	NE	Northeast	10	Residential		5925	5,835	2,787	2	2,916.5	
McCall	NE	Northeast	10	Industrial		0	0	0	2.4	0	
McKenzie Lake	SE	Southeast		Residential		13290	14,062	4,653	5.1	2,754.9	
McKenzie Towne	SE	Southeast		Residential		17505	15,395	6,783	4.8	3,354.6	
Meadowlark Park	SW	Centre		Residential		610	605	277	0.6	1,038.3	
Meridian	NE/SE	Northeast	10	Industrial		0	0	0	1.4	0	
Midnapore	SE	South		Residential		6480	6,888	2,726	2.9	2,365.9	
Millrise	SW/SE	South		Residential		6655	6,717	2,635	1.8	3,828.9	
Mission	SW/SE	Centre		Residential		4505	4,363	3,177	0.5	8,650	
Monterey Park	NE	Northeast	10	Residential		10475	10,460	3,164	3.4	3,079.4	
Mount Pleasant	NW	Centre		Residential		6325	4,718	2,654	1.9	2,553.2	
Montgomery	NW	Northwest	7	Residential	*1956(1911)	4175	3,686	1,839	3	1,286.7	
New Brighton	SE	Southeast		Residential		12885	7,314	3,247	2.9	2,863.1	
Nolan Hill	NW	North		Residential		8755	0	23	2.1	0	
North Airways	NE	Northeast	10	Industrial		0	20	3	1.2	0	
North Glenmore Park	SW	West		Residential		2435	2,388	1,020	1.2	1,988.3	
North Haven	NW	North	5	Residential		2365	2,282	988	0.8	2,860	
North Haven Upper	NW	North	4	Residential		640	615	246	0.229	2,073.3	
Nose Hill Park	NW	Northwest	4	Major Park		0	0	0	11.6	0	
Oakridge	SW	South		Residential		5620	5,719	2,291	2.4	2,354.6	
Ogden	SE	Southeast		Residential		8315	8,432	3,879	4.1	2,122.4	
Ogden Shops	SE	East		Industrial		0	0	0	2.2	0	
Osprey Hill			1								
Palliser	SW	South		Residential		3285	3,301	1,707	1	3,293	
Panorama Hills	NW	North	3	Residential		25535	19,851	7,398	6.3	3,531.3	
Parkdale	NW	Centre		Residential		2300	2,317	1,020	1.1	2,087.3	
Parkhill	SW	Centre		Residential		1770	1,623	849	0.7	2,274.3	
Parkland	SE	South		Residential		3430	3,772	1,448	1.8	2,102.8	
Patterson	SW	West		Residential		4145	4,162	2,008	2	2,140.5	
Pegasus	NE	Northeast	5	Industrial		0	0	2	0.3	0	
Penbrooke Meadows	SE	East		Residential		8235	8,188	3,212	2	4,273.5	Commonly confused with Forest Lawn
Pine Creek						245					Commonly referred as Creekside
Pineridge	NE	Northeast	10	Residential	1974	9850	9,626	3,799	2.6	3,709.2	
Point Mckay	NW	Centre		Residential		1330	1,318	846	0.4	3,295	
Pump Hill	SW	South		Residential		1455	1,655	563	0.9	1,793.3	
Queens Park Village	NW	Centre		Residential		375	400	188	0.6	691.7	
Queensland	SE	South		Residential		4585	4,877	1,894	1.6	2,981.9	
Ramsay	SE	Centre		Residential		2155	2,006	1,132	1	2,110	
Ranchlands	NW	Northwest		Residential		7490	7,529	3,051	2.3	3,315.7	
Rangeview	SE										
Rangeview Springs	SE	Southeast									
Red Carpet	SE	East	9	Residential		1745	1,630	917	0.6	2,591.7	
Redstone	NE	Northeast	5	Residential		9050	0	0	1.9	0	
Renfrew	NE	Centre		Residential		6580	5,669	3,231	2.7	2,165.2	
Residual Ward 1	NW/SW	West/ Northwest		Residual Area			343	110	n/a	—	
Residual Ward 2	NW	North/ Northwest		Residual Area			1,140	25	n/a	—	
Residual Ward 3	NE/NW	North/ Northeast		Residual Area			109	31	n/a	—	
Residual Ward 4				Residual Area			4	0	n/a	—	
Residual Ward 5	NE	Northeast		Residual Area			28	11	n/a	—	
Residual Ward 6	SW	West		Residual Area			36	13	n/a	—	
Residual Ward 7				Residual Area			0	0	n/a	—	
Residual Ward 8				Residual Area			0	0	n/a	—	
Residual Ward 9	SE	East/ Southeast		Residual Area			40	7	n/a	—	
Residual Ward 10	SE/NE	East		Residual Area			827	378	n/a	—	
Residual Ward 11				Residual Area			6	0	n/a	—	
Residual Ward 12	SE	Southeast		Residual Area			327	135	n/a	—	
Residual Ward 13	SW	South		Residual Area			60	36	n/a	—	
Residual Ward 14	SE/SW	South		Residual Area			58	27	n/a	—	
Richmond	SW	Centre		Residential		5250	4,113	2,259	1.8	2,349.4	
Rideau Park	SW	Centre		Residential		675	627	342	0.3	2,120	
Riverbend	SE	Southeast		Residential		9205	9,749	3,449	4.1	2,362	
Rockland Park	NW	Northwest	1	Residential	2021				1.76		Ongoing development. estimated total population of 9000 across 3100 dwellings.
Rocky Ridge	NW	Northwest		Residential		8195	7,266	2,972	2.8	2,736.4	
Rosedale	NW	Centre		Residential		1495	1,592	636	0.7	2,241.4	
Rosemont	NW	Centre		Residential		1155	1,208	563	0.5	2,482	
Rosscarrock	SW	West		Residential		3490	3,175	1,645	1.1	3,050.9	Sometimes referred to as Westbrook
Roxboro	SW	Centre		Residential		415	441	161	0.231	1,403.3	
Royal Oak	NW	Northwest		Residential		11580	10,979	3,940	3.6	3,125.6	
Royal Vista	NW	Northwest		Industrial		0	0	0	1.3	0	
Rundle	NE	Northeast	10	Residential	1973	10545	11,029	3,836	2.6	4,330	
Rutland Park	SW	West		Residential		2140	2,309	972	0.7	3,181.4	
Saddle Ridge	NE	Northeast	5	Residential	1960	24365	13,388	3,668	5.5	2,613.1	Sometimes referred to as Saddletowne
Saddle Ridge Industrial	NE	Northeast	5	Industrial		0	60	24	2.5	14	
Sage Hill	NW	North		Residential		9345	1,425	992	3.8	576.1	
Sandstone Valley	NW	North		Residential		5795	6,142	2,120	1.8	3,473.9	
Scarboro	SW	Centre		Residential		1010	870	343	0.5	1,760	
Scarboro/Sunalta West	SW	Centre		Residential		465	397	165	0.4	1,025	
Scenic Acres	NW	Northwest		Residential		7850	8,710	2,921	4.3	2,011.6	
Section 23	SE	Southeast		Industrial			0	1	3.1	0	
Seton	SE	Southeast	12	Residential	2018	3590		0	1.7	0	
Seton Ridge	SE	Southeast	12	Residential	2024				0.8		
Shaganappi	SW	Centre		Residential		1765	1,459	862	1.5	1,035.3	
Shawnee Slopes	SW	South		Residential		2020	1,529	866	1.2	1,304.2	
Shawnessy	SW/SE	South		Residential	1981	9055	9,315	3,300	3.7	2,536.5	
Shepard Industrial	SE	Southeast		Residential		265	250	151	4.2	59.8	Sometimes referred to as just Shepard or South Hill
Sherwood	NW	North		Residential		6520	2,109	979	2.4	1,051.3	
Signal Hill	SW	West		Residential		13000	13,795	5,253	5.6	2,484.6	
Silver Springs	NW	Northwest		Residential		8570	8,910	3,533	5	1,786.6	
Silverado	SW/SE	South		Residential		7975	4,337	1,898	5.1	1,007.1	
Skyline East	NE	Northeast		Industrial		0	0	0	0.6	0	
Skyline West	NE	North		Industrial		0	0	0	0.8	0	
Skyview Ranch	NE	Northeast		Residential		12870	1,805	1,306	4.6	650	
Somerset	SW/SE	South		Residential		8320	8,401	3,136	2.3	3,713	
South Airways	NE	Northeast	10	Industrial		0	0	2	1.9	0	
South Calgary	SW	Centre		Residential		4540	3,642	2,244	0.9	4,108.9	
South Foothills	SE	Southeast		Industrial		0	0	3	3.6	0	
Southview	SE	East		Residential		1550	2,063	936	1.6	1,187.5	Commonly confused with Forest Lawn
Southwood	SW	South		Residential		6095	5,965	2,658	2.7	2,253.7	Commonly referred to as Southland
Springbank Hill	SW	West		Residential		9840	8,388	3,166	6.3	1,394.1	
Spruce Cliff	SW	West		Residential		4195	3,992	2,344	1.1	3,895.5	
St. Andrews Heights	NW	Centre		Residential		1345	1,470	645	1.2	1,323.3	
Starfield	SE	East		Industrial		0	0	2	4.3	0	
Starling	NW	Northwest	2	Residential	2024				1.14		
Stonegate Landing	NE	Northeast		Industrial		0	0	0	5.4	0	
Stoney 1	NE	North		Industrial		0	0	5	6.1	0	
Stoney 2	NE	Northeast		Industrial		0	0	1	4	0	
Stoney 3	NE	Northeast		Industrial		0	0	0	1.3	0	
Stoney 4	NE	Northeast		Industrial		0	0	3	5.6	0	
Strathcona Park	SW	West		Residential	1980	6830	7,039	2,436	2.7	2,604.8	
Sunalta	SW	Centre		Residential	1910	3090	3,116	2,130	0.9	3,682.2	
Sundance	SE	South		Residential	1982	9590	10,623	3,406	4	2,624.8	
Sunnyside	NW	Centre		Residential	1904	4000	3,751	2,340	1	3,704	
Sunridge	NE	Northeast	10	Industrial		0	40	7	2.3	14.3	
Symons Valley Ranch	NW	North		Residential					0.137		Smallest neighborhood by land area
Taradale	NE	Northeast	5	Residential	1984	17630	16,110	4,559	2.9	5,807.2	
Temple	NE	Northeast	10	Residential	1977	10525	10,580	3,648	2.6	4,190	
Thorncliffe	NW/NE	North		Residential		8695	8,640	3,858	3.3	2,634.2	
Tuscany	NW	Northwest	1	Residential	1994	19700	18,838	6,492	6.9	2,755.5	
Tuxedo Park	NE/NW	Centre		Residential		5165	4,430	2,686	1.3	3,516.2	
University District	NW	Northwest	7	Residential		960	?	?	?	?	
University Heights	NW	Northwest	7	Residential		2965	2,890	1,380	0.8	3,660	
University of Calgary	NW	Northwest	7	Residential		?	2,355	927	2.7	1,009.3	
Upper Mount Royal	SW	Centre		Residential		2735	2,536	1,071	1.3	1,955.4	
Valley Ridge	NW	West		Residential		5365	5,042	1,768	3.3	1,519.1	
Valleyfield	SE	East		Industrial		0	0	6	1.2	0	
Varsity	NW	Northwest		Residential		12040	12,021	5,547	6.8	1,794.1	
Vermilion Hills											
Vista Heights	NE	Northeast		Residential		2300	2,274	844	1.1	2,003.6	
Walden	SE	South		Residential		7650	594	450	2.4	389.6	
West Hillhurst	NW	Centre		Residential		6635	5,757	2,947	2.4	2,417.5	
West Springs	SW	West		Residential		11560	7,849	2,795	4.1	2,006.8	
Westgate	SW	West		Residential		3225	3,101	1,334	1.2	2,643.3	
Westwinds	NE	Northeast	5	Industrial		0	0	0	2	0	
Whitehorn	NE	Northeast	10	Residential		11085	11,541	3,869	2.6	4,558.5	
Wildwood	SW	West		Residential	1956	2765	2,582	1,056	2.6	999.2	
Willow Park	SE	South		Residential		5050	5,308	2,282	3.4	1,537.9	
Windsor Park	SW	Centre		Residential		4410	3,858	2,421	1.3	3,173.8	
Winston Heights/Mountview	NE	Centre		Residential		3605	3,760	1,883	3	1,297	
Wolf Willow	SE	South		Residential		525					
Woodbine	SW	South		Residential	1980	8745	9,086	3,371	3.2	2,853.4	
Woodlands	SW	South		Residential	1976	5830	6,201	2,397	2.8	2,214.6	
Yorkville	SW	South	13	Residential		715				?	
Total City of Calgary							1,090,936	459,339	848.20	1,320.7	

Founded refers to the year which the first buildings finished construction in that neighborhood

*means about when the neighborhood was founded

(Year)refer to when the town was founded

== Notable sub-communities ==
There are several notable sub-communities which are not official Calgary communities, but exist as distinct entities from the rest of their respective communities. Notable examples include:

Albert Park / Radisson Heights: Albert Park, Radisson Heights

Beltline: Connaught, Victoria Park, West Connaught

Belvedere: East Hills

Bowness: Lower Bowness, Upper Bowness

Chaparral: Chaparral Valley

Douglasdale / Douglas Glen: Douglas Glen, Douglasdale, Quarry Park

East Shepard Industrial: North Dufferin Industrial, Point Trotter Industrial

Greenwood / Greenbriar: Greenbriar, Greenwood

Hidden Valley: Hanson Ranch

Hillhurst: Broadview, Kensington, Southern Alberta Institute of Technology (SAIT), Westmount

Inglewood: East Inglewood, Mill's Estates

McKenzie Lake: Mountain Park

McKenzie Towne: Elgin, Inverness, McKenzie Towne Common, Prestwick

Ogden: Lynnwood, old Ogden

Pine Creek: Creekside

Pineridge: Village Square

Ricardo Ranch: Logan Landing, Nostalgia, Seton Ridge

Saddle Ridge: Saddletowne, Savanna, Saddlebrook

Shepard: South Hill

Tuxedo Park: Balmoral

Varsity: University Innovation Quarter, Varsity Estates

West Springs: Wentworth

== Former communities ==
With Calgary having official sub-divisions for its neighborhoods, over time some neighborhoods have been discontinued as the city has increased.

List of discontinued neighborhoods
Name	Quadrant	Type	Founded	Discontinued	Now a part of
Albert Park	SE	Residential	1910		Albert Park/Radisson Heights
Balmoral	NW	Residential			Tuxedo Park
Belfast	NE	Residential			Mayland Heights
Briar Hill	NW	Residential			Hounsfield Heights/Briar Hill
Bridgeland	NE	Residential			Bridgeland/Riverside
Broadview	NW	Residential	Early 1900s		Hillhurst
Burnsland	SE	Industrial			Manchester Industrial
Capeear	SE	Residential			Ogden
Connaught	SW	Residential	1914	2001	Beltline
Dover Glen	SE	Residential			Dover
East Calgary	SE	Residential	1876		Inglewood
East Manchester	SE	Industrial			Burns Industrial
Glendale Meadows	SW	Residential			Glendale
Glencoe	SW	Residential			Elbow Park
Glengarry	SW	Residential			Killarney/Glengarry
Grandview	SE	Residential	Early 1900s		Ramsay
Happyland	NW	Residential	Early 1900s		Parkdale and parts of West Hillhurst
Hounsfield Heights	NW	Residential			Hounsfield Heights/Briar Hill
Hubalta	SE	Residential	1960s		Forest Lawn and Forest Lawn Industrial
Knob Hill	SW	Residential			Richmond
Lake Bonaventure	SE	Residential			Lake Bonavista
Lynnview Ridge	SE	Residential	1970s	2001	Evacuated due to contamination, now sits empty
Lynnwood	SE	Residential			Ogden
Manchester Works	SE	Industrial			Manchester Industrial
Mill's Estates	SE	Residential	1871		Inglewood
Millican Estates	SE	Residential			Ogden
Parkview	SE/SW	Residential		Late 1990s	Erlton
Pleasant Heights	NW	Residential			Capitol Hill
Radisson Heights	SE	Residential			Albert Park/Radisson Heights
Regal Terrace	NE	Residential			Renfrew
Richmond Park	SW	Residential			Richmond
Riverdale	SW	Residential			Britannia
Riverside	NE	Residential			Bridgeland/Riverside
Spring Gardens	NE	Industrial			Greenview Industrial
Stampede Corrall	SE	Industrial			Beltline
Sylvan Terrace	NW	Residential			Parkdale
Varsity Acres	NW	Residential			Varsity
Varsity Estates	NW	Residential			Varsity
Varsity Village	NW	Residential			Varsity
Victoria Park	SE/SW	Residential	1910s	2001	Beltline
West Calgary	SW	Residential			Killarney/Glengarry, Scarboro/Sunalta West, Shaganappi
West Dover	SE	Residential			Dover
Westmount	NW	Residential			West Hillhurst

== Business improvement areas ==
Calgary's Business Improvement Areas (BIA; formerly Business Revitalization Zones or BRZ) are business districts established by businesses within an area to jointly raise and administer funds for various projects and promotional activities within that zone throughout the year. BIAs in Calgary are established for one or more of the following purposes: "improving, beautifying and maintaining property" in the BIA; "developing, improving and maintaining public parking;" and/or promoting the BIA as a business or shopping area.

The BRZ program in Calgary was established in 1983 to allow certain commercial areas of the city to administer and promote themselves internally. Many of the zones that emerged from this have since acquired a virtual "neighbourhood" status by the people of Calgary. (None of these zones are officially designated as neighbourhoods unto themselves, however.)

These are the 15 Business Improvement Areas of Calgary as of 2022:

- 17th Ave Retail & Entertainment District
- 4th Street South West BIA (located mostly within Mission)
- Beltline BIA
- Bridgeland BIA
- Calgary Downtown Association
- Chinatown BIA
- Crescent Heights Village BIA
- Greenview Industrial BIA (formerly HIPville BIA)
- Inglewood
- International Avenue
- Kensington BIA
- Mainstreet Bowness BIA
- Marda Loop BIA
- Montgomery on the Bow BIA
- Victoria Park BIA

== Planning areas ==
The City of Calgary has divided the city into 42 local planning areas to facilitate more comprehensive urban development. These areas group multiple communities together based on shared amenities, geographic features, and common planning needs.

Boundaries are primarily determined by major roads (e.g., Crowchild Trail, Deerfoot Trail) and geographic features (rivers, large parks). This approach aims to create stronger community linkages, address common issues, and enable more holistic growth planning.

=== Known planning areas ===
- Chinook
- East Calgary/International Avenue (formerly Greater Forest Lawn Communities)
- Heritage
- North Hill
- Riley
- South Shaganappi
- West Elbow
- Westbrook

== Industrial areas ==
Most industrial areas are located between Deerfoot Trail and 36 Street East in the northern half of the city; between Macleod Trail, Deerfoot Trail and Glenmore Trail in the south and east of Barlow Trail in the southeast.

== Gallery ==
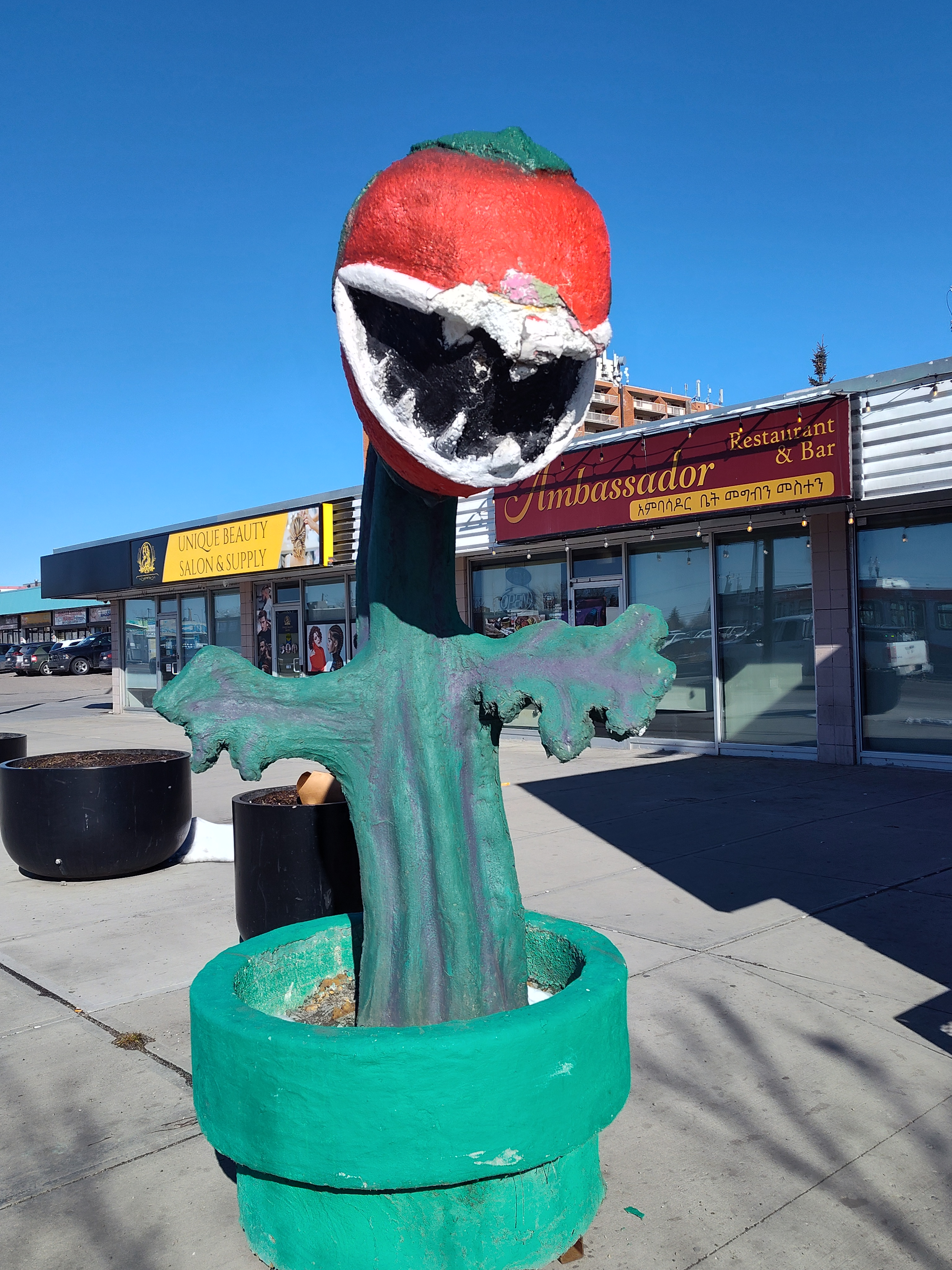
Albert Park/Radisson Heights

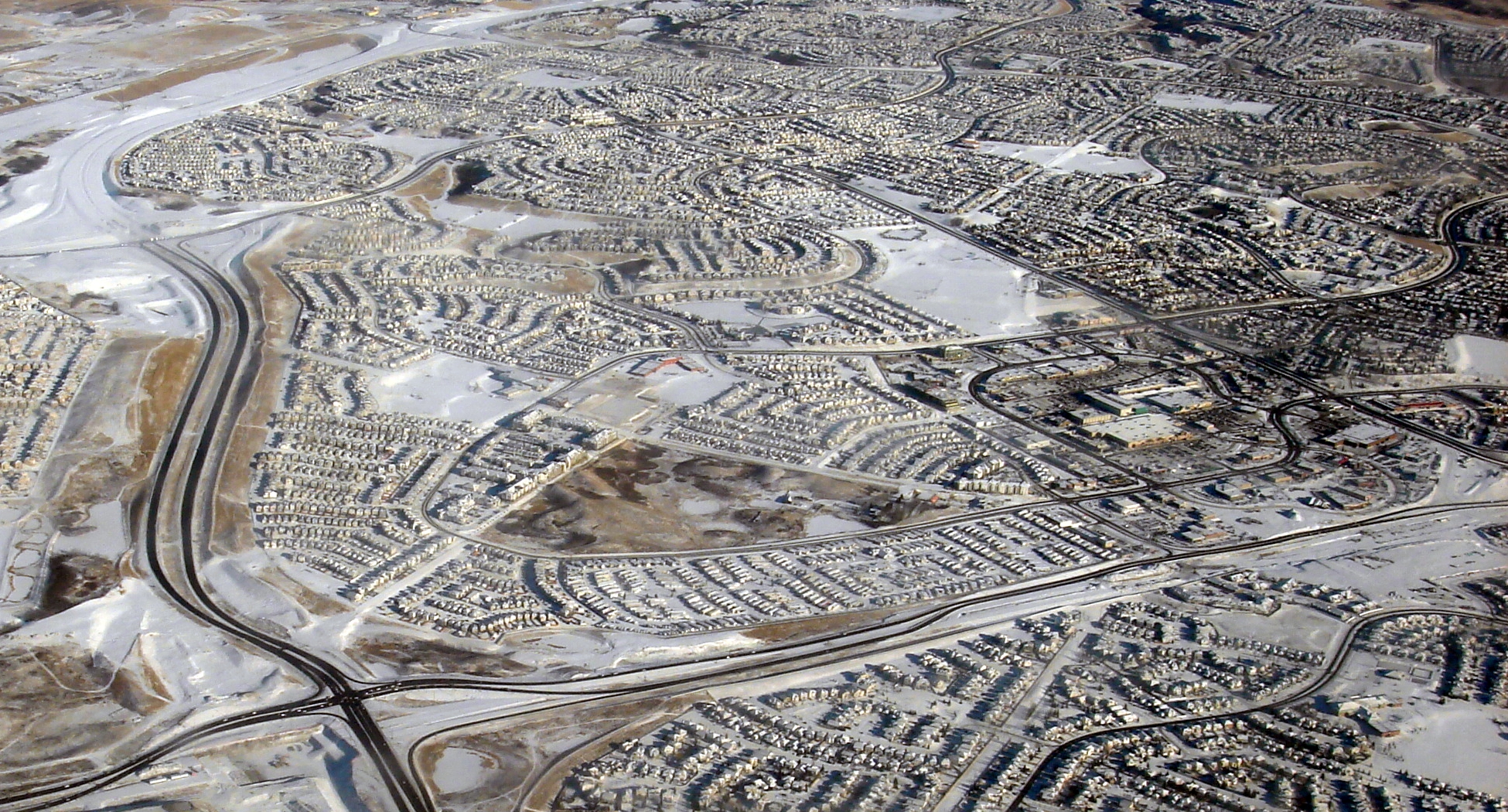
Arbour Lake

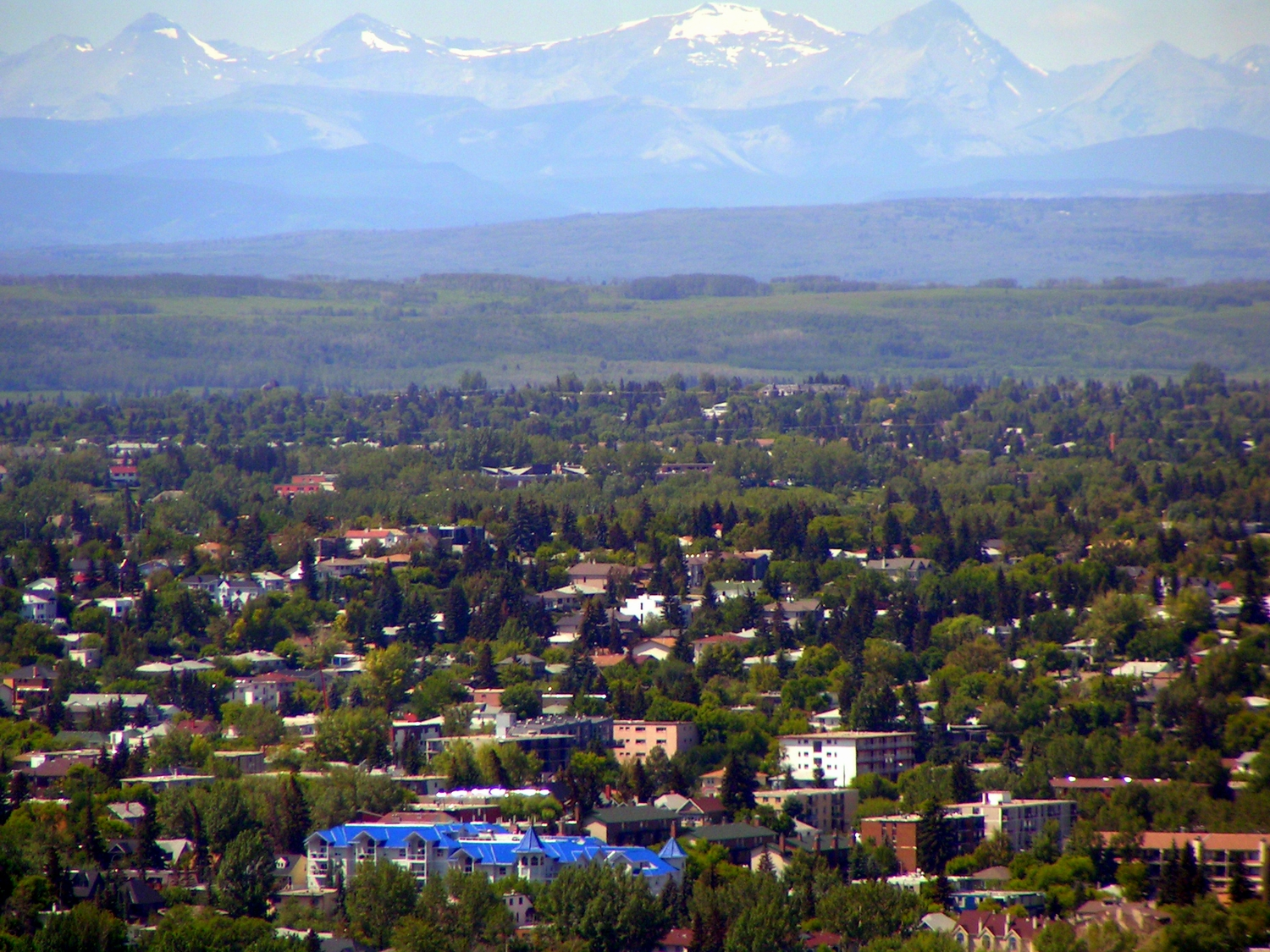
Bankview

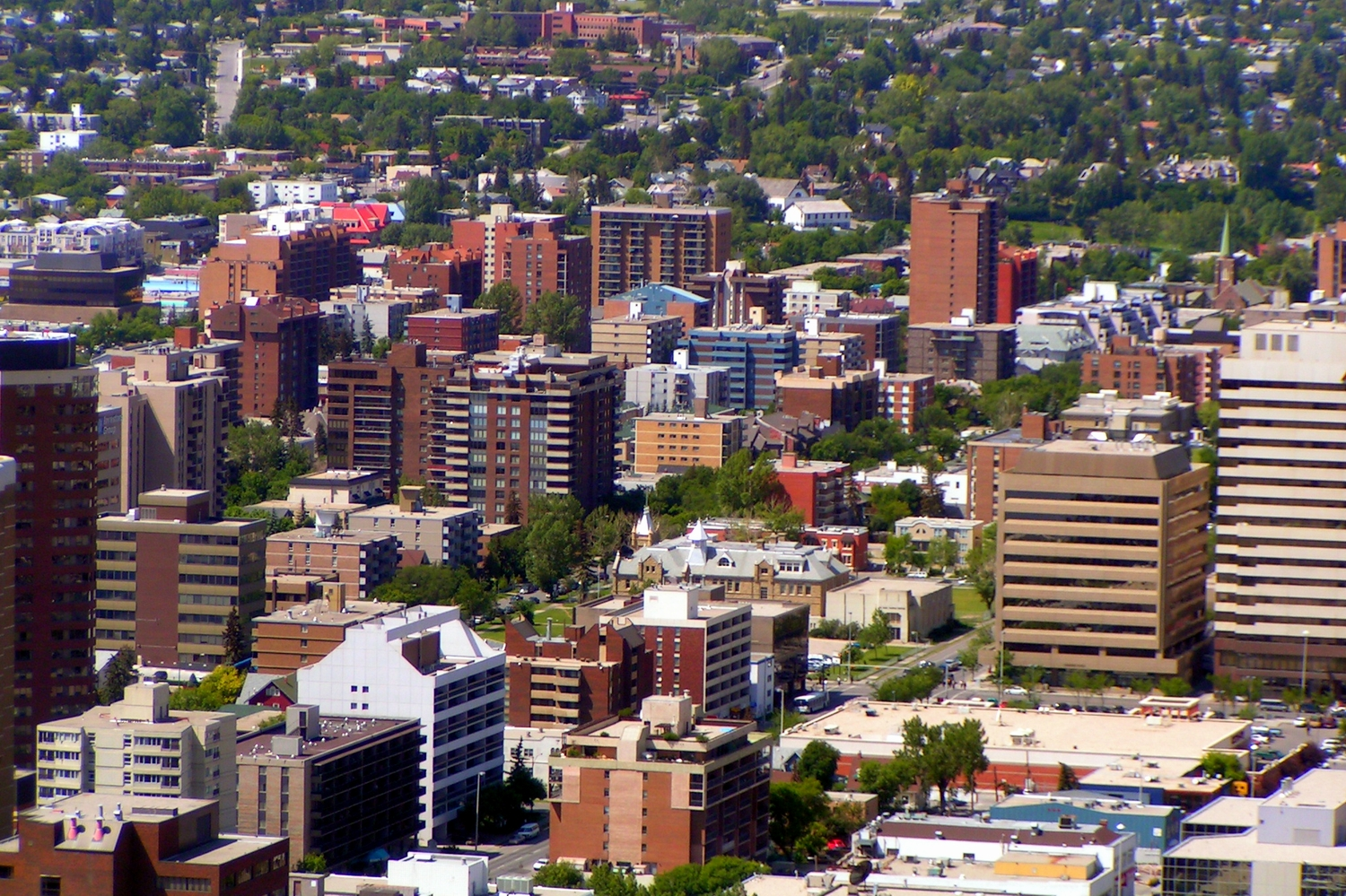
Beltline

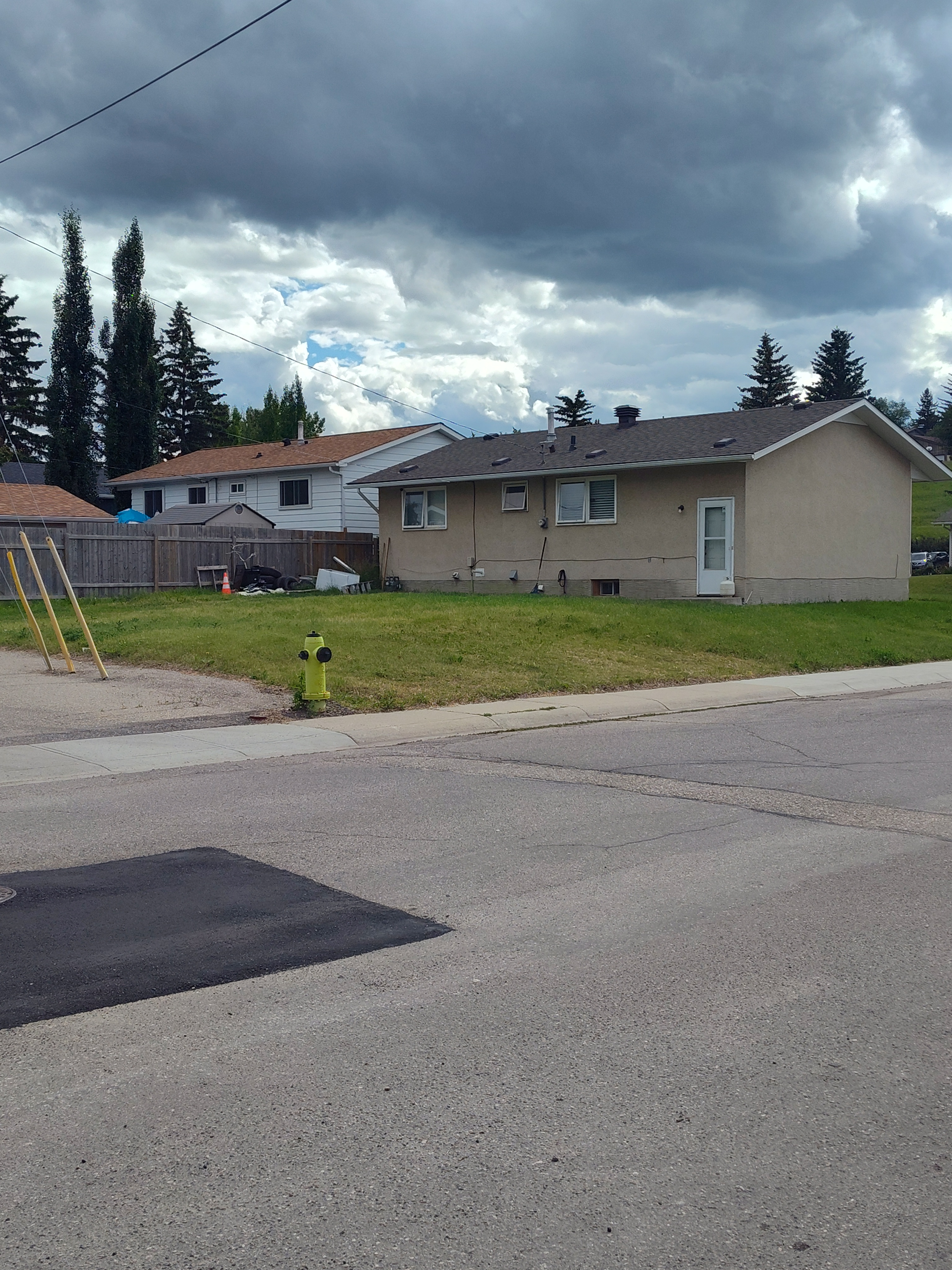
Bonavista Downs

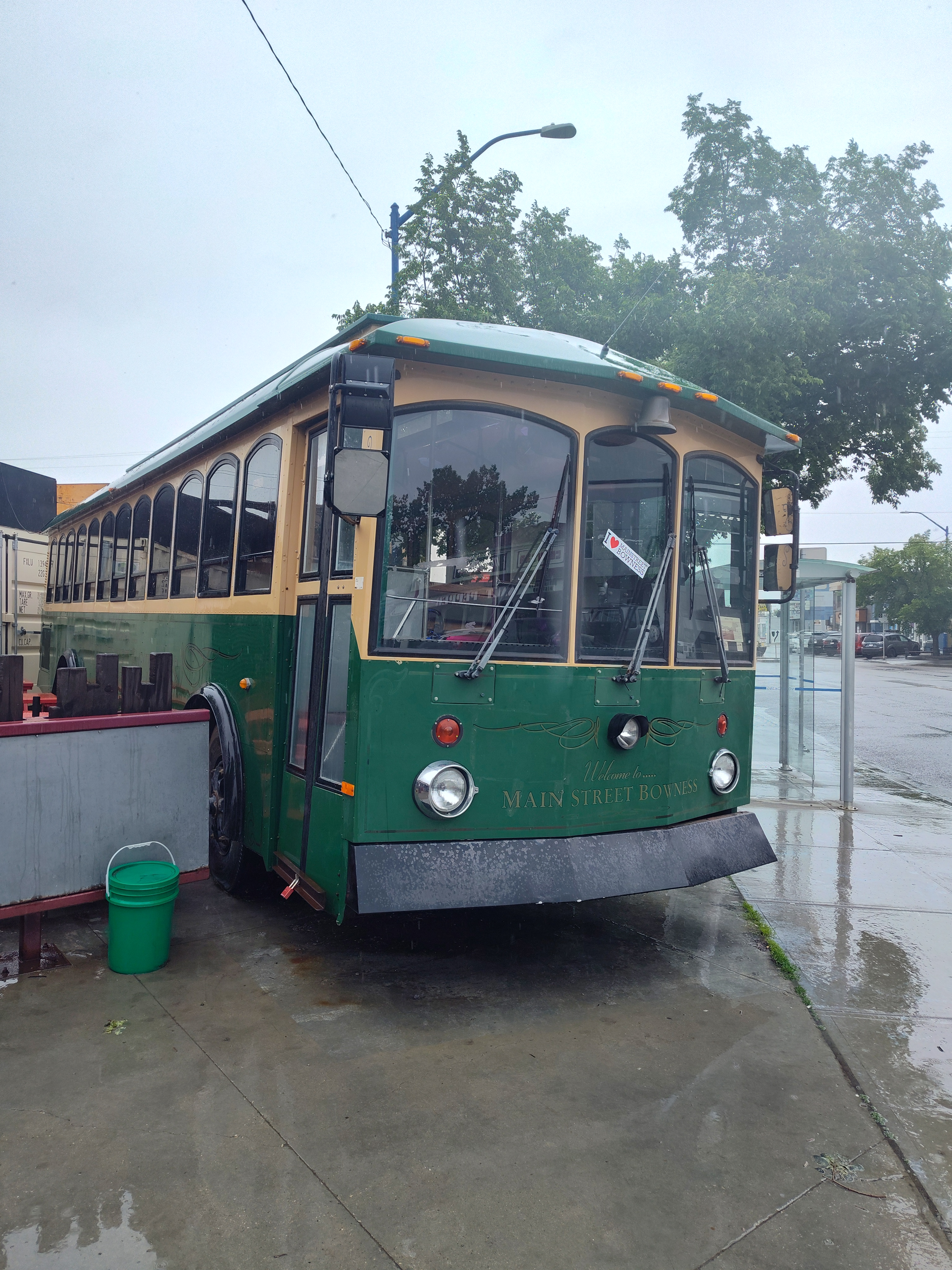
Bowness

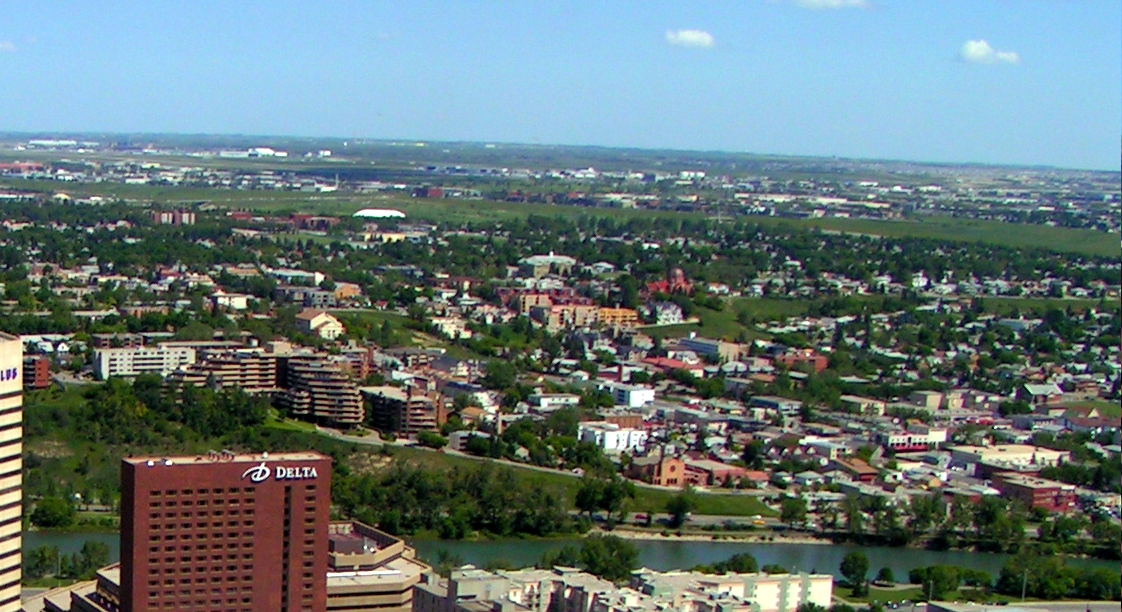
Bridgeland/Riverside

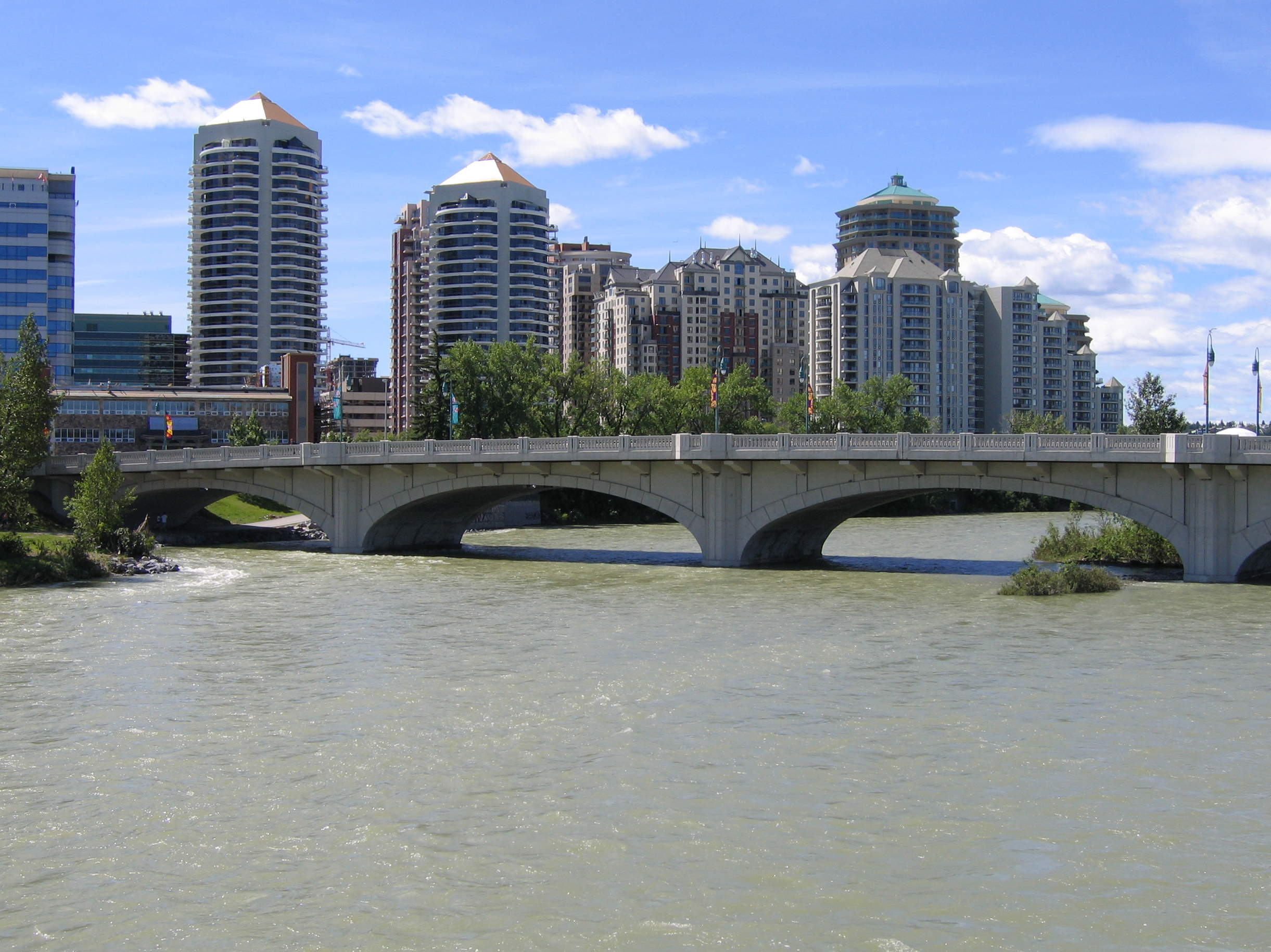
Downtown West End

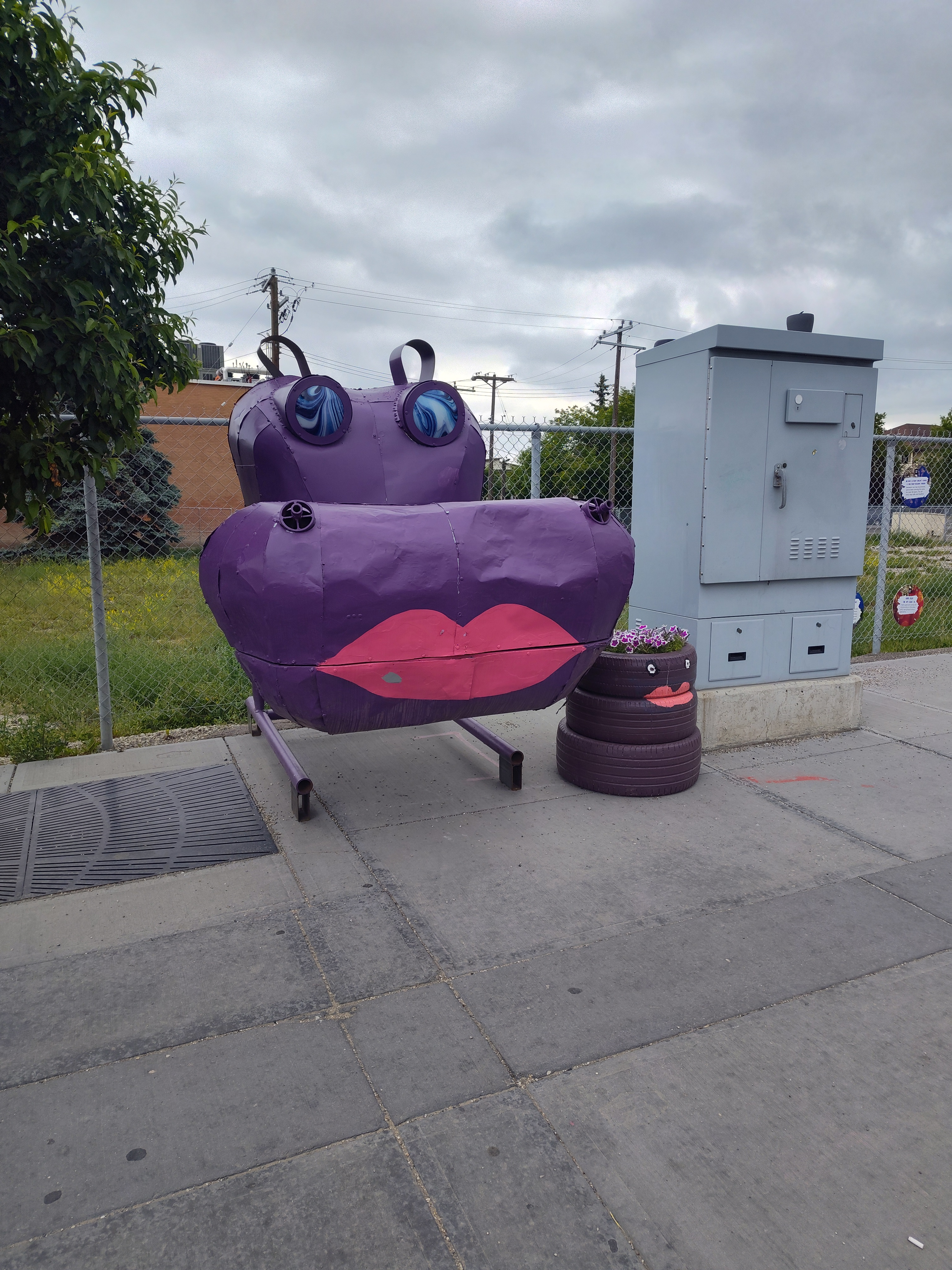
Forest Lawn

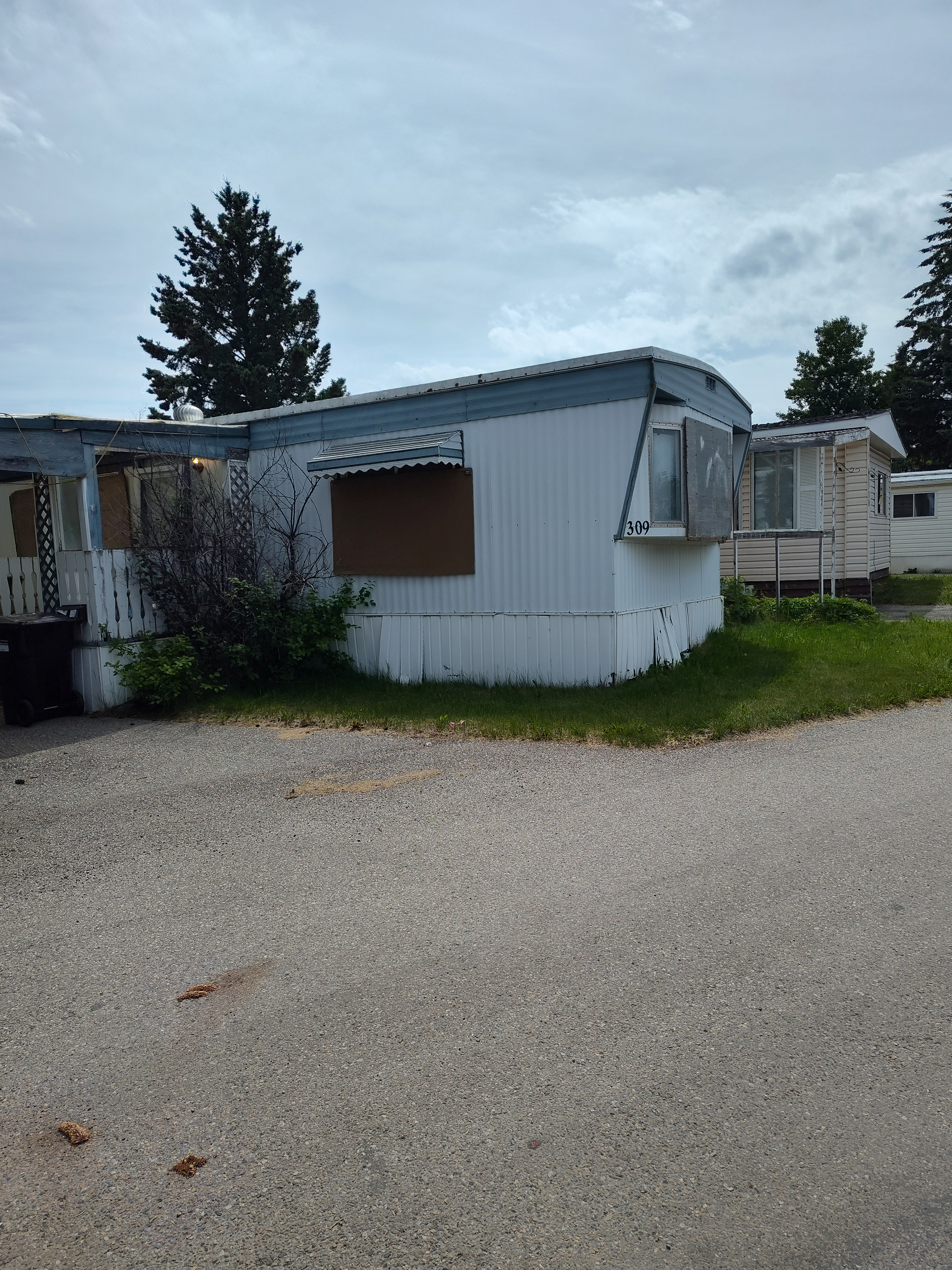
Greenwood/Greenbriar

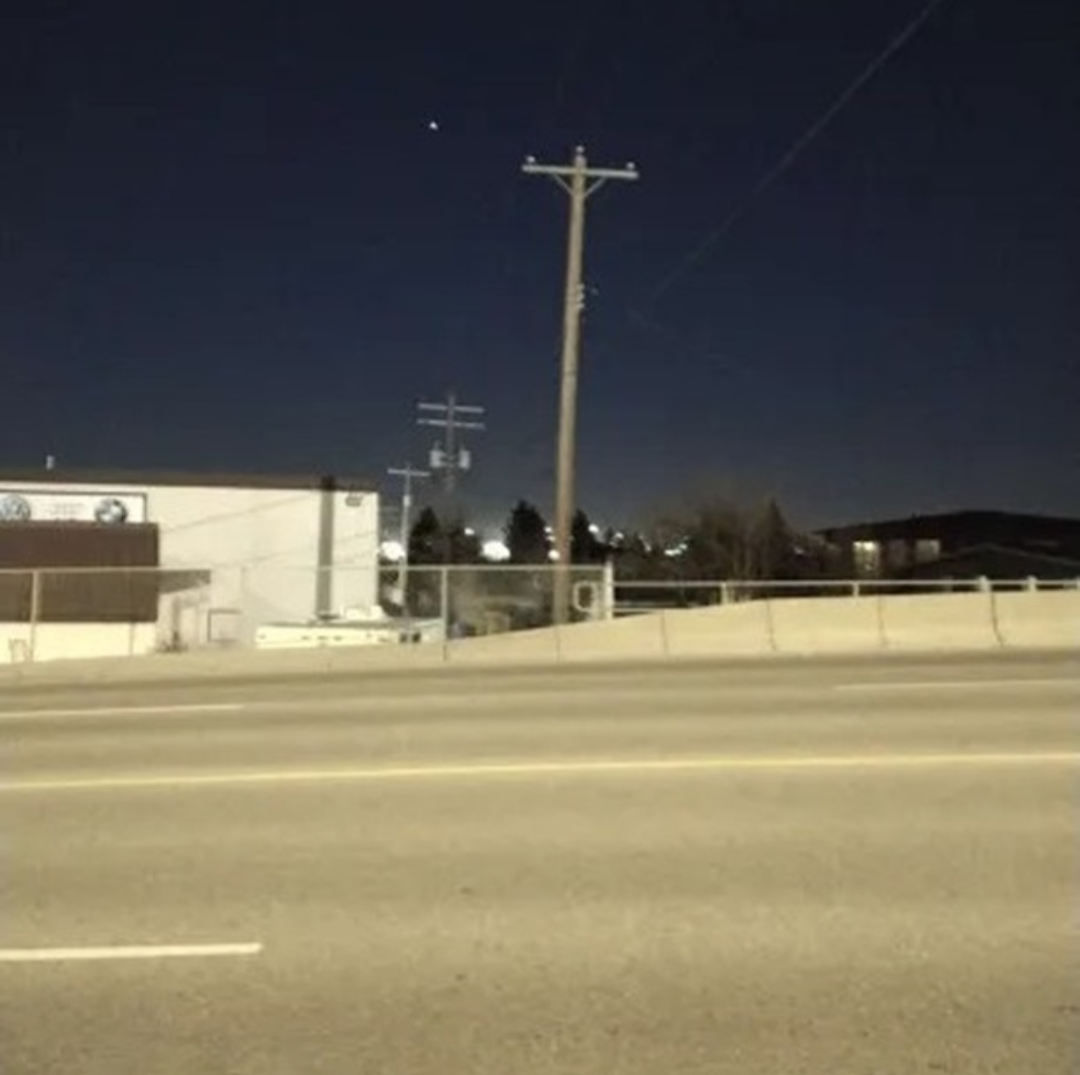
Highland Park

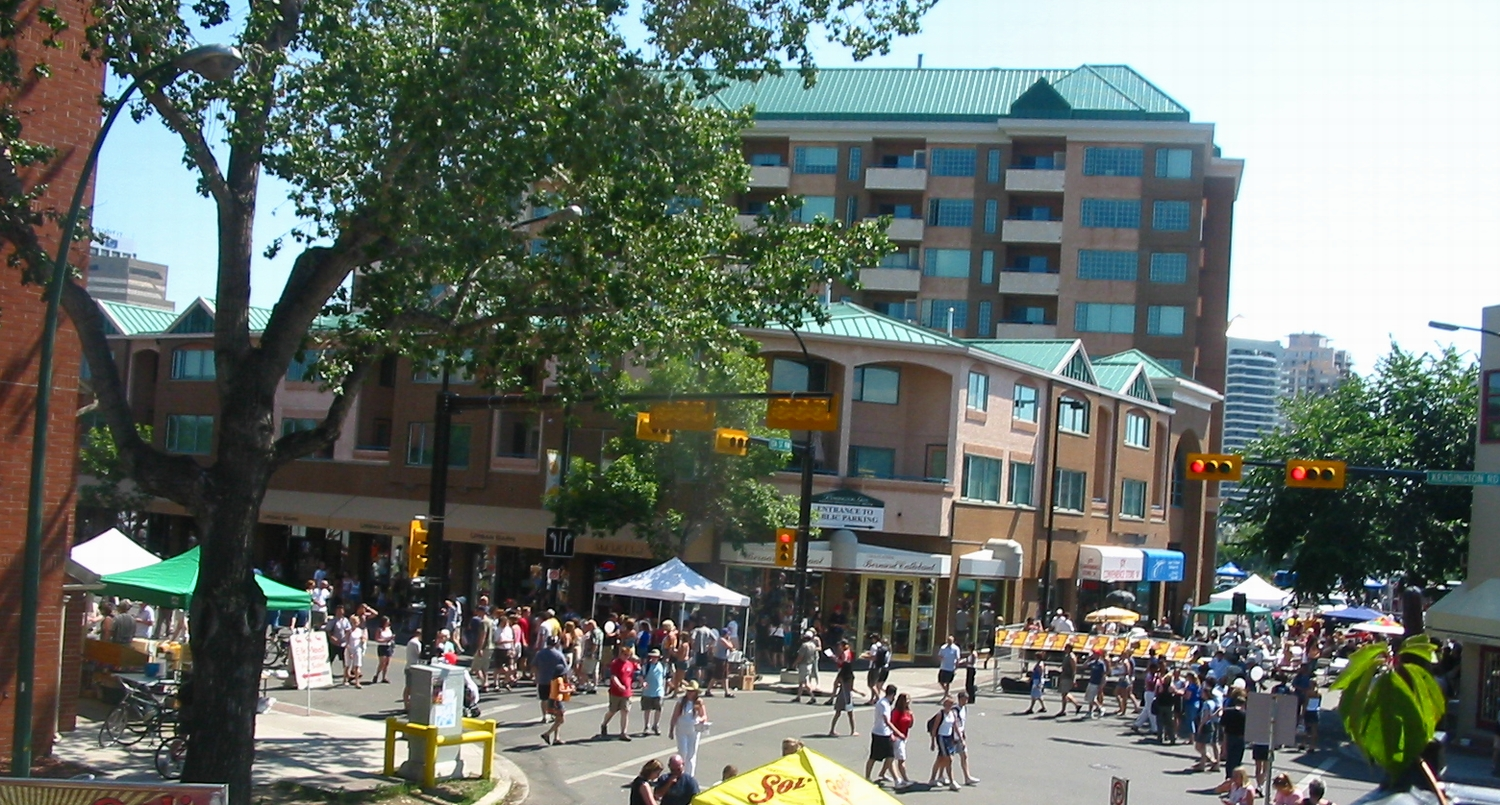
Hillhurst

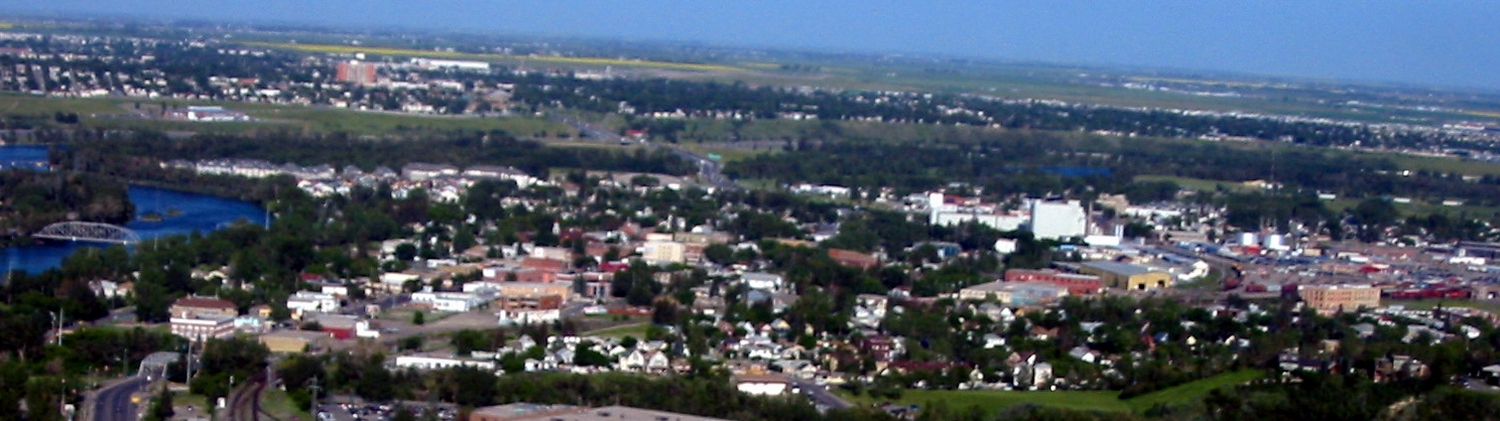
Inglewood

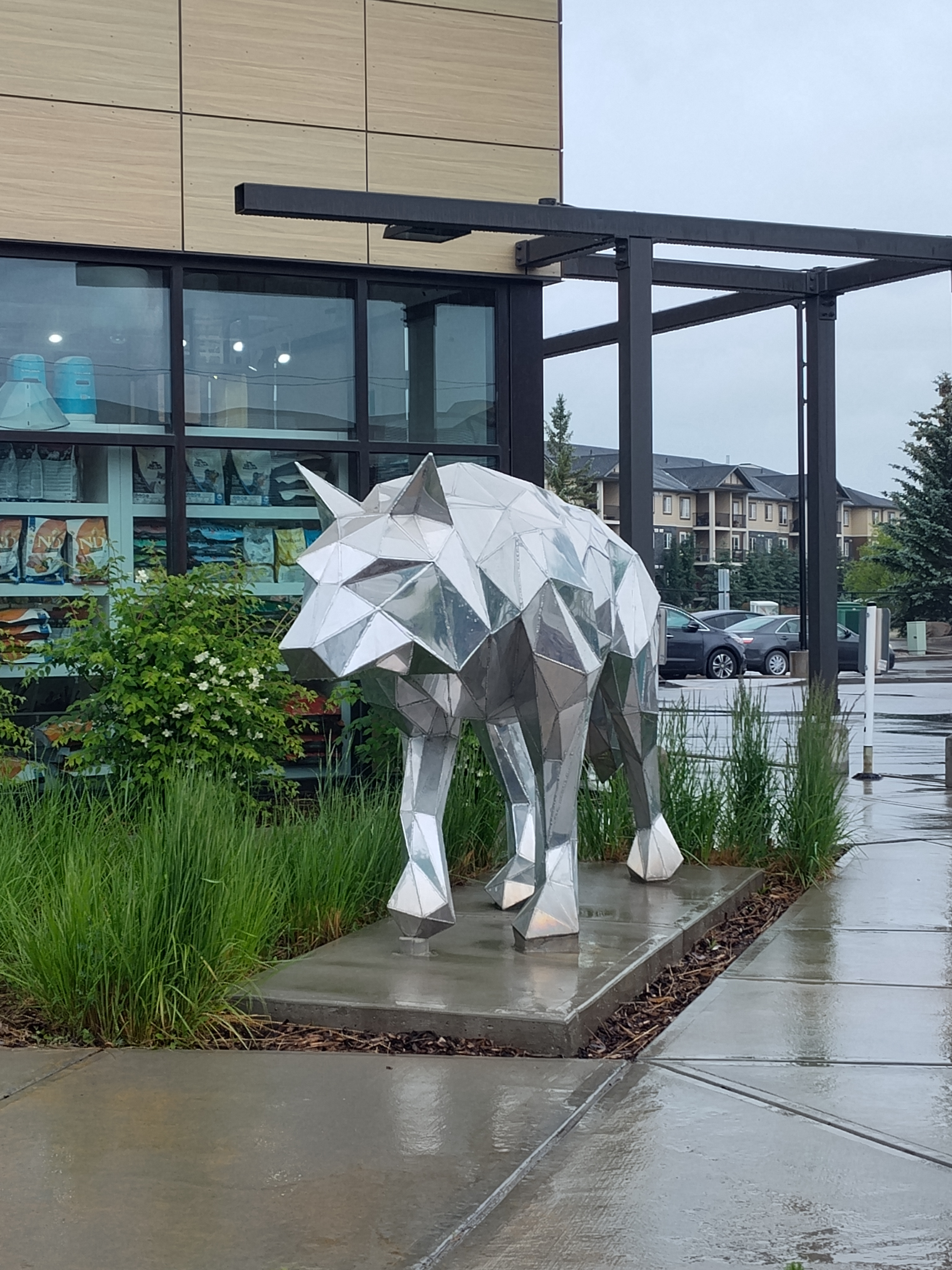
Legacy

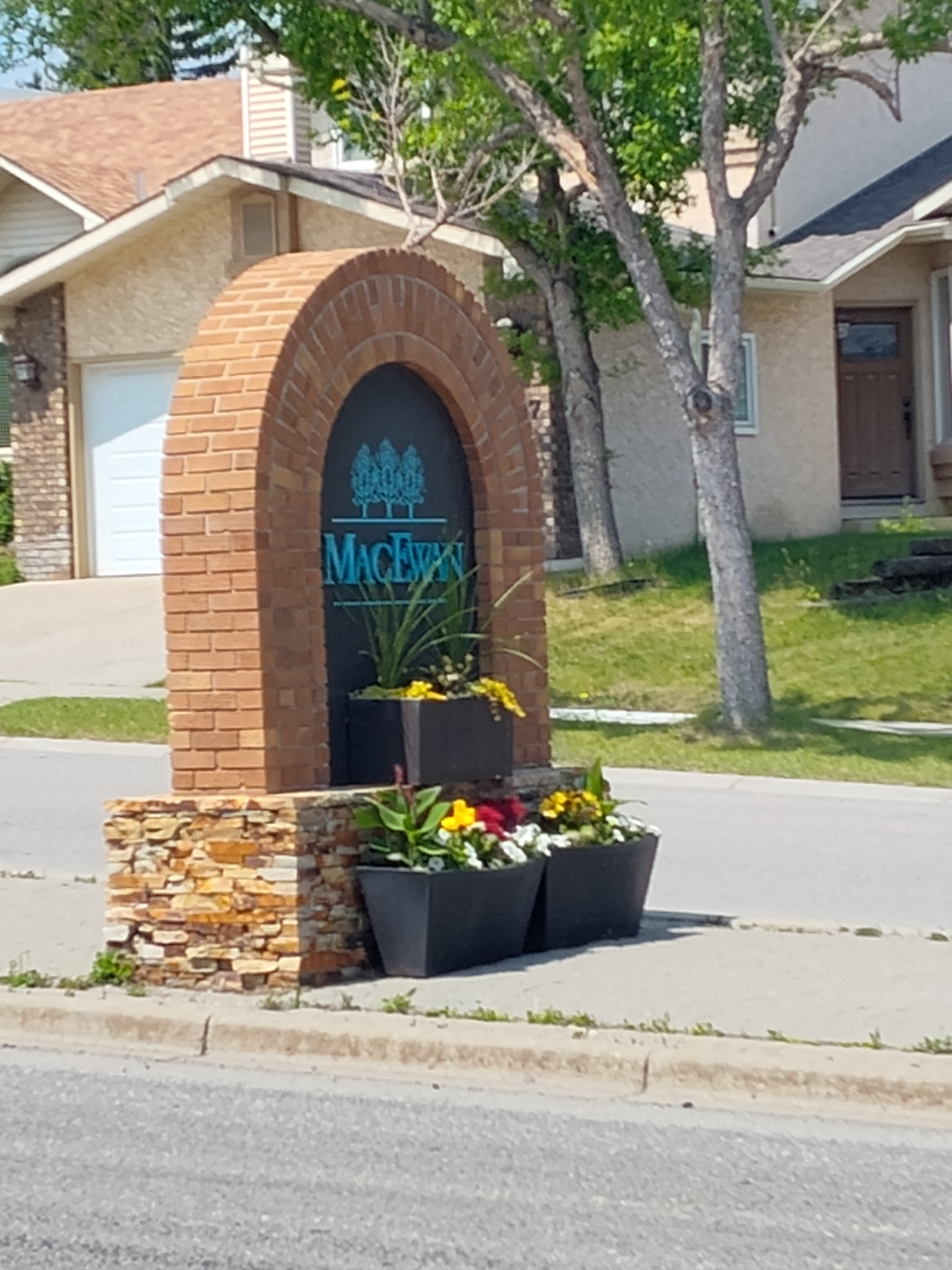
MacEwan Glen

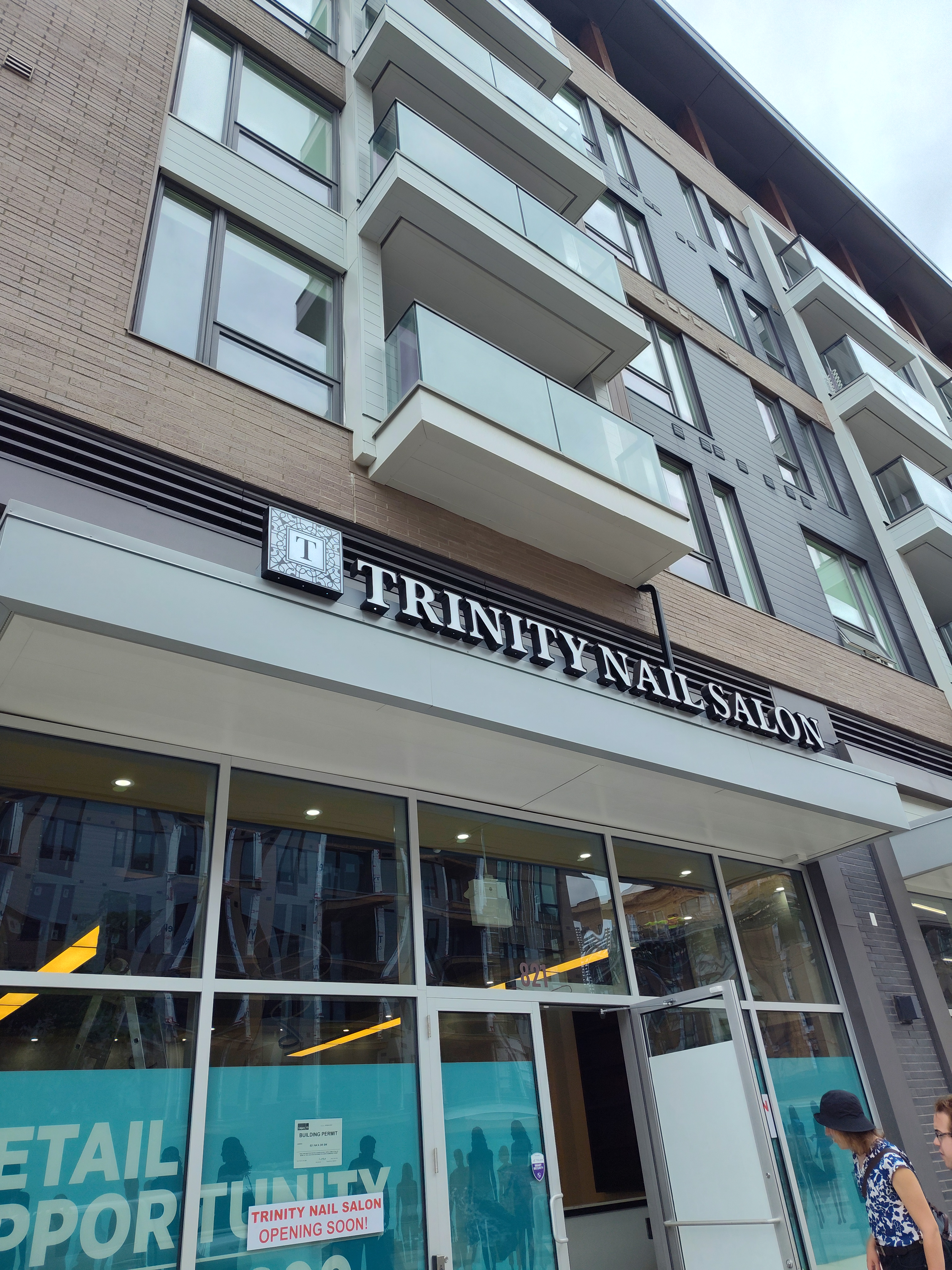
Medicine Hill

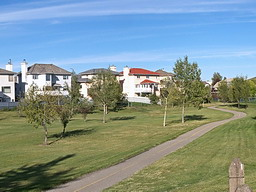
Monterey Park

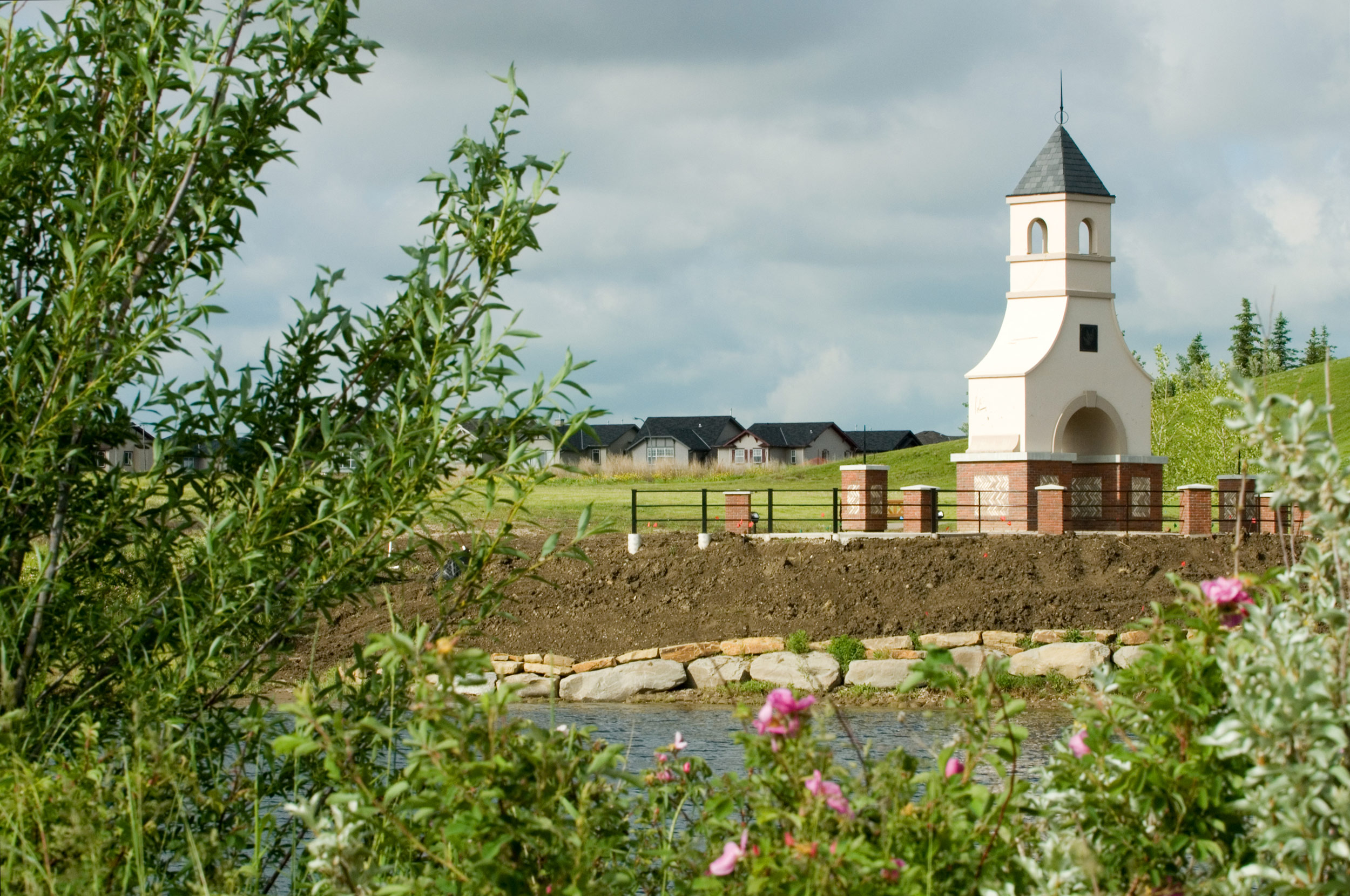
New Brighton

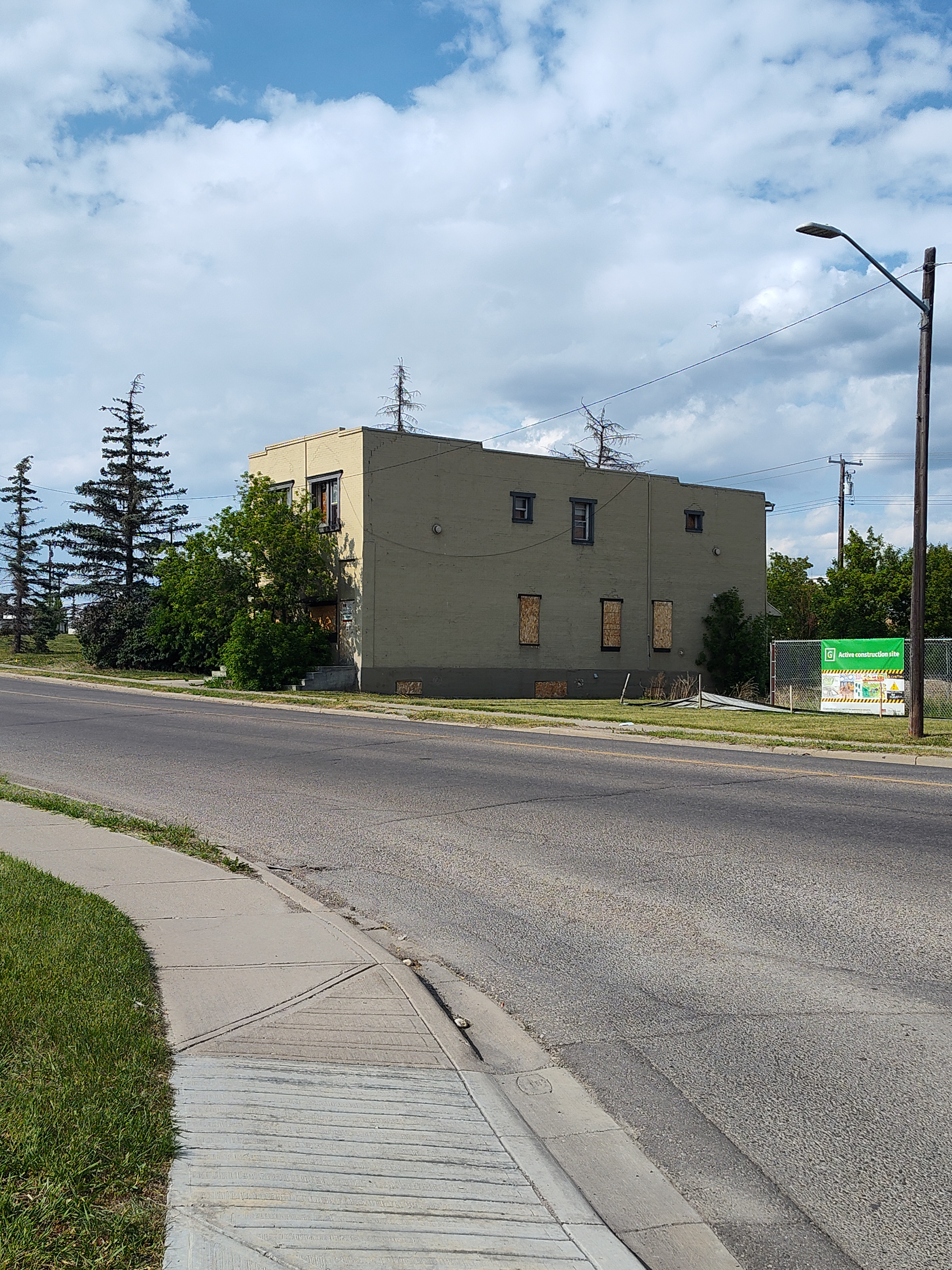
Ogden

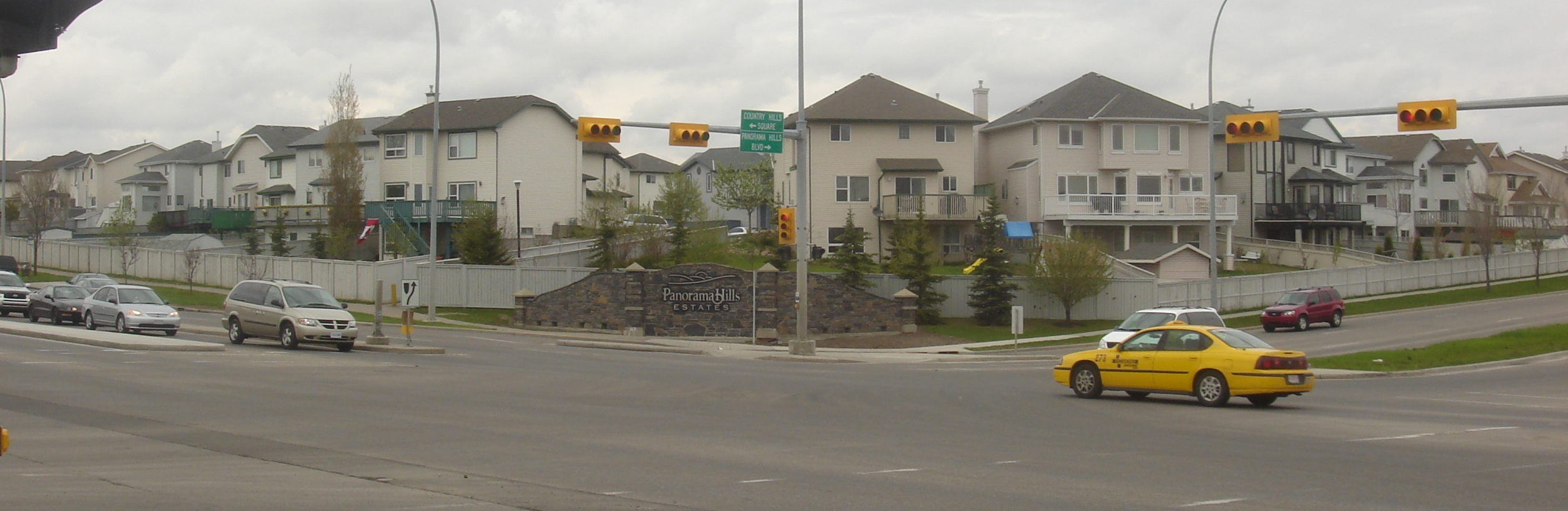
Panorama Hills

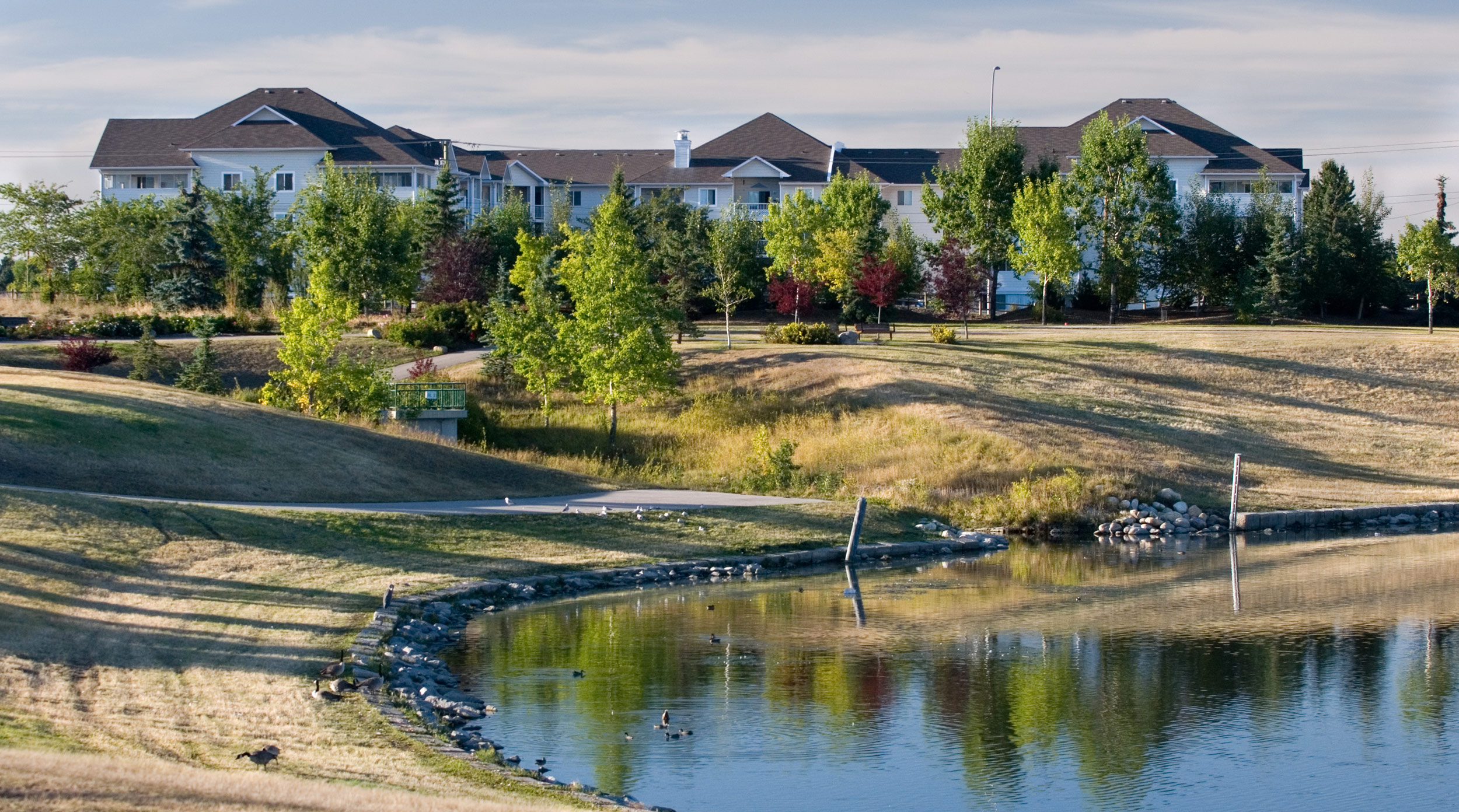
Red Carpet

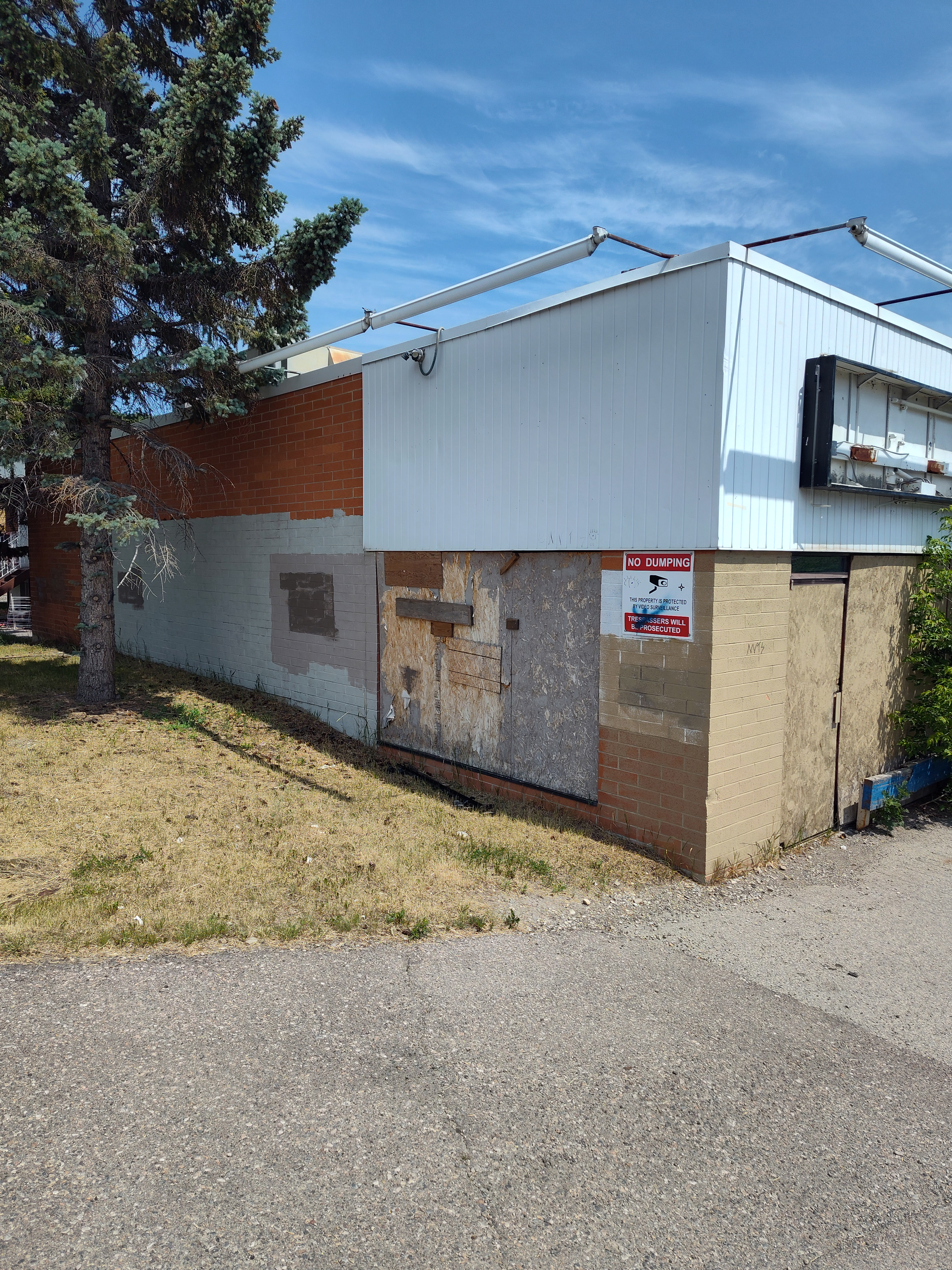
Rosscarrock

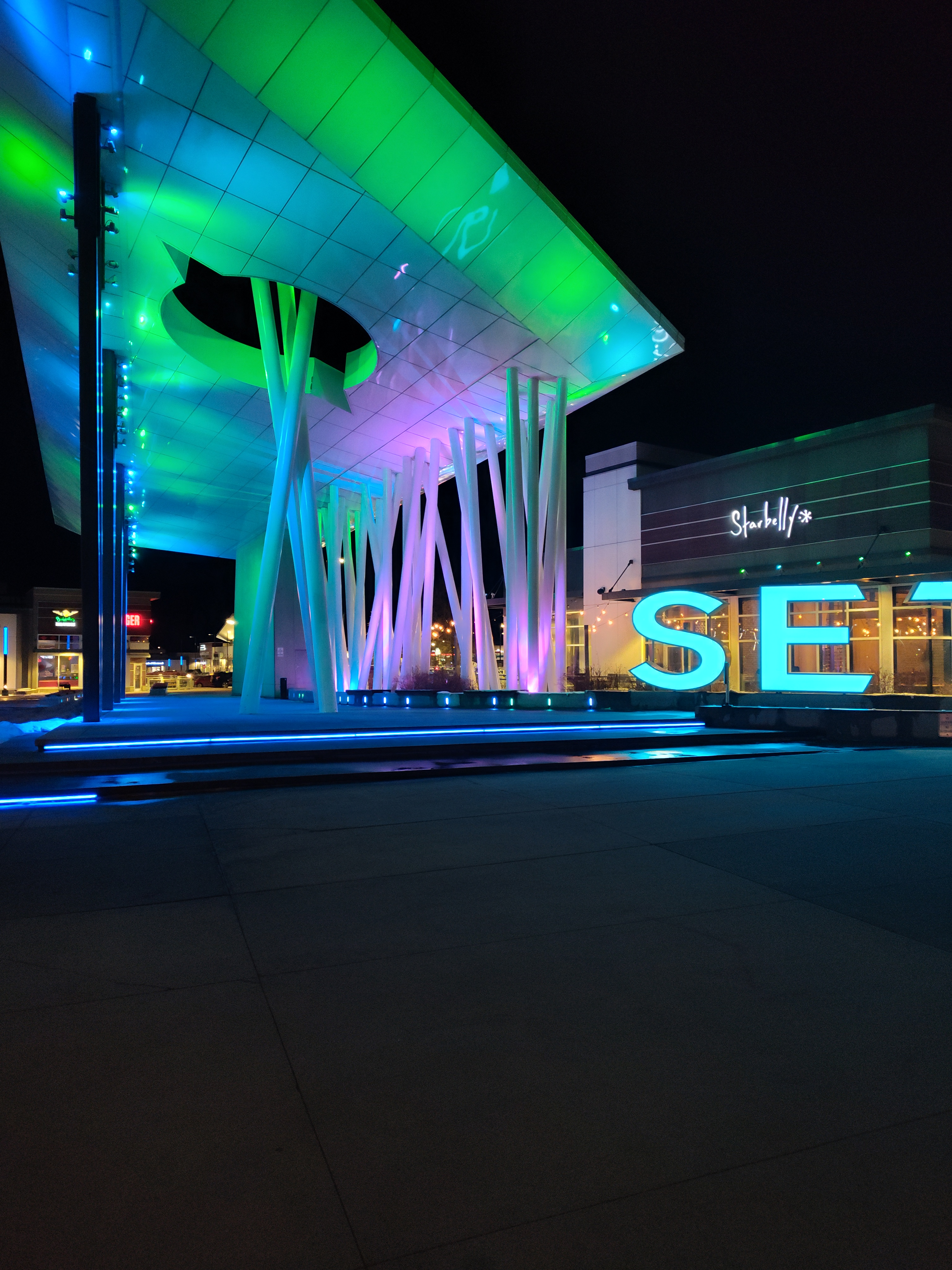
Seton

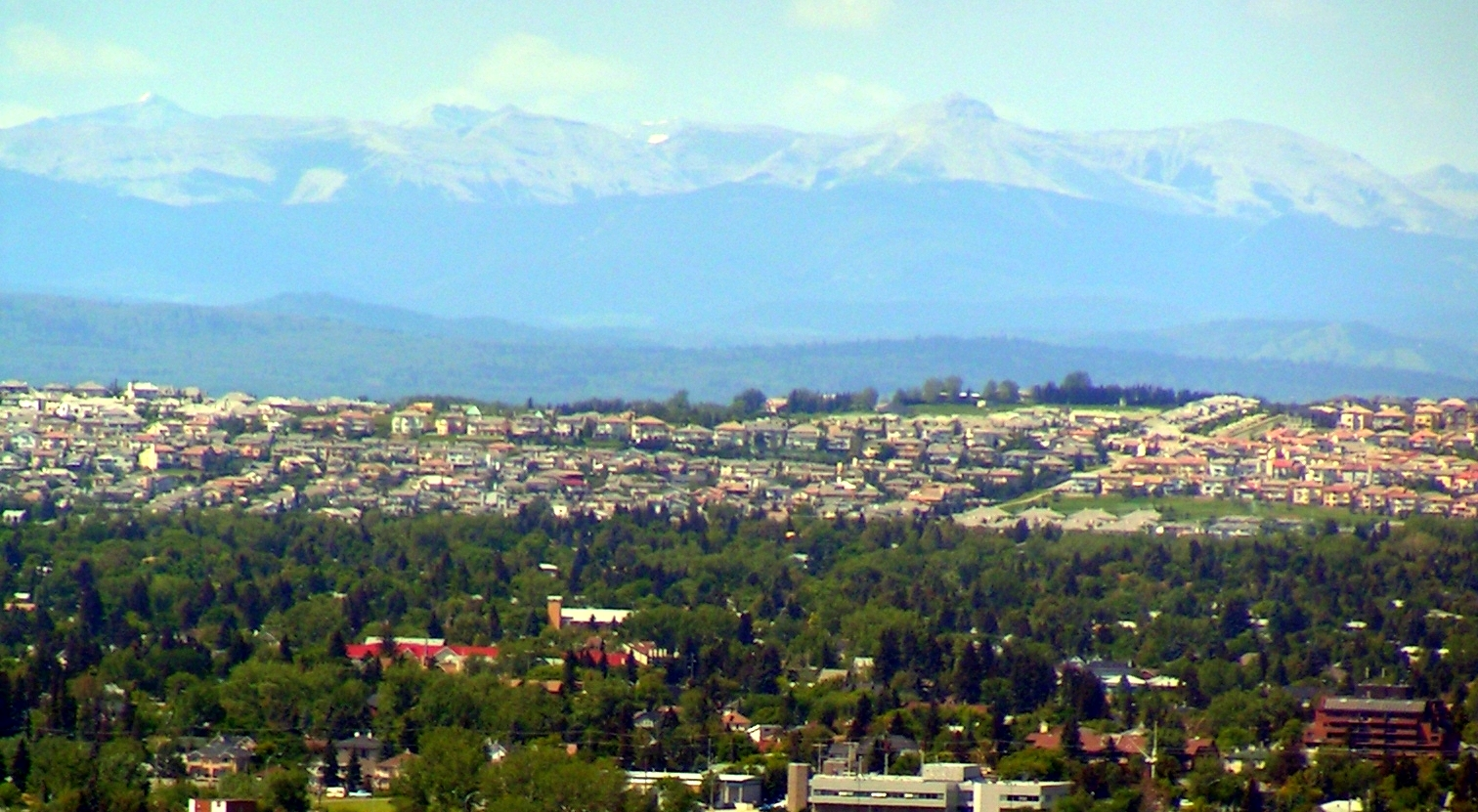
Signal Hill

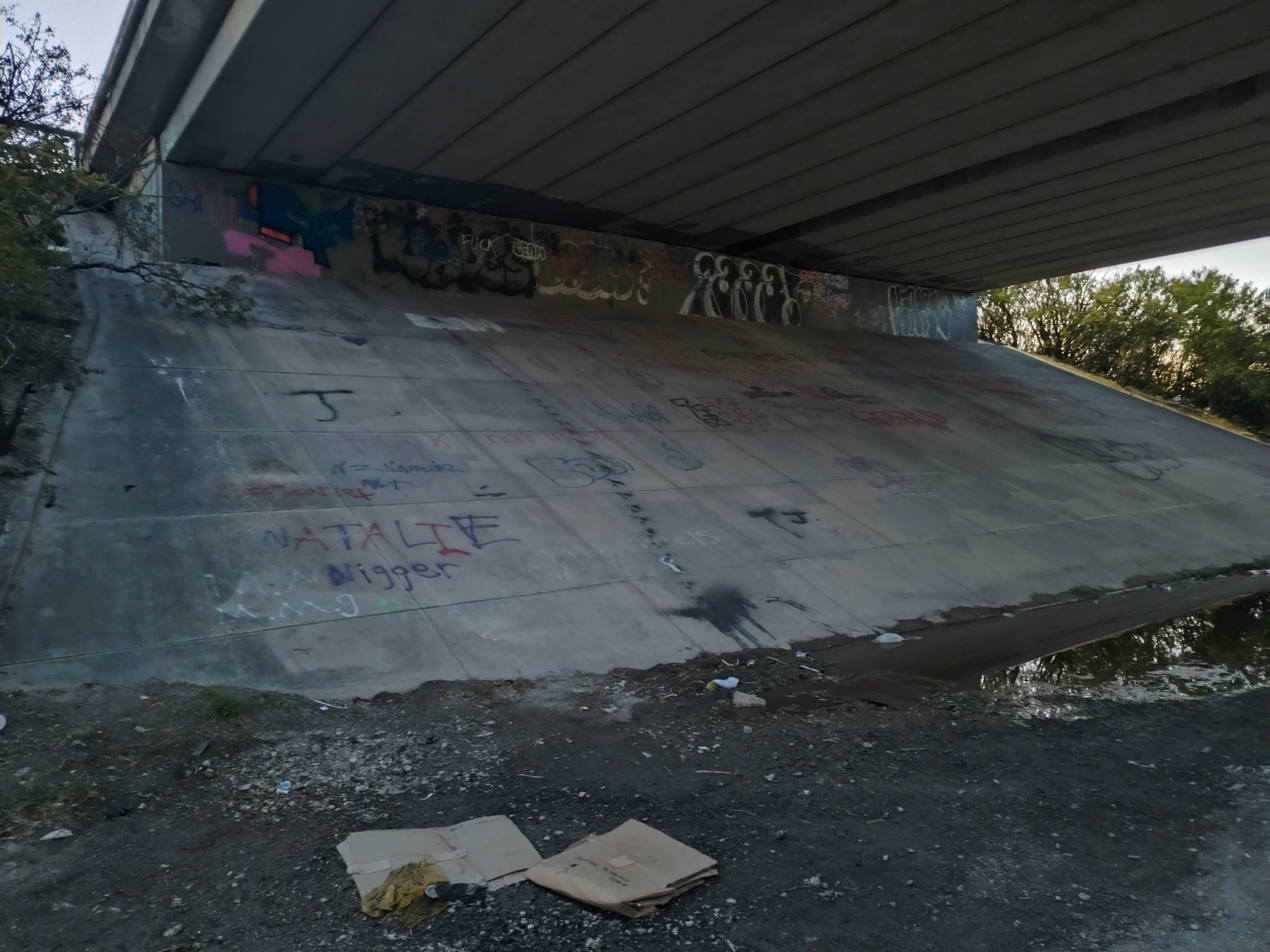
Southwood

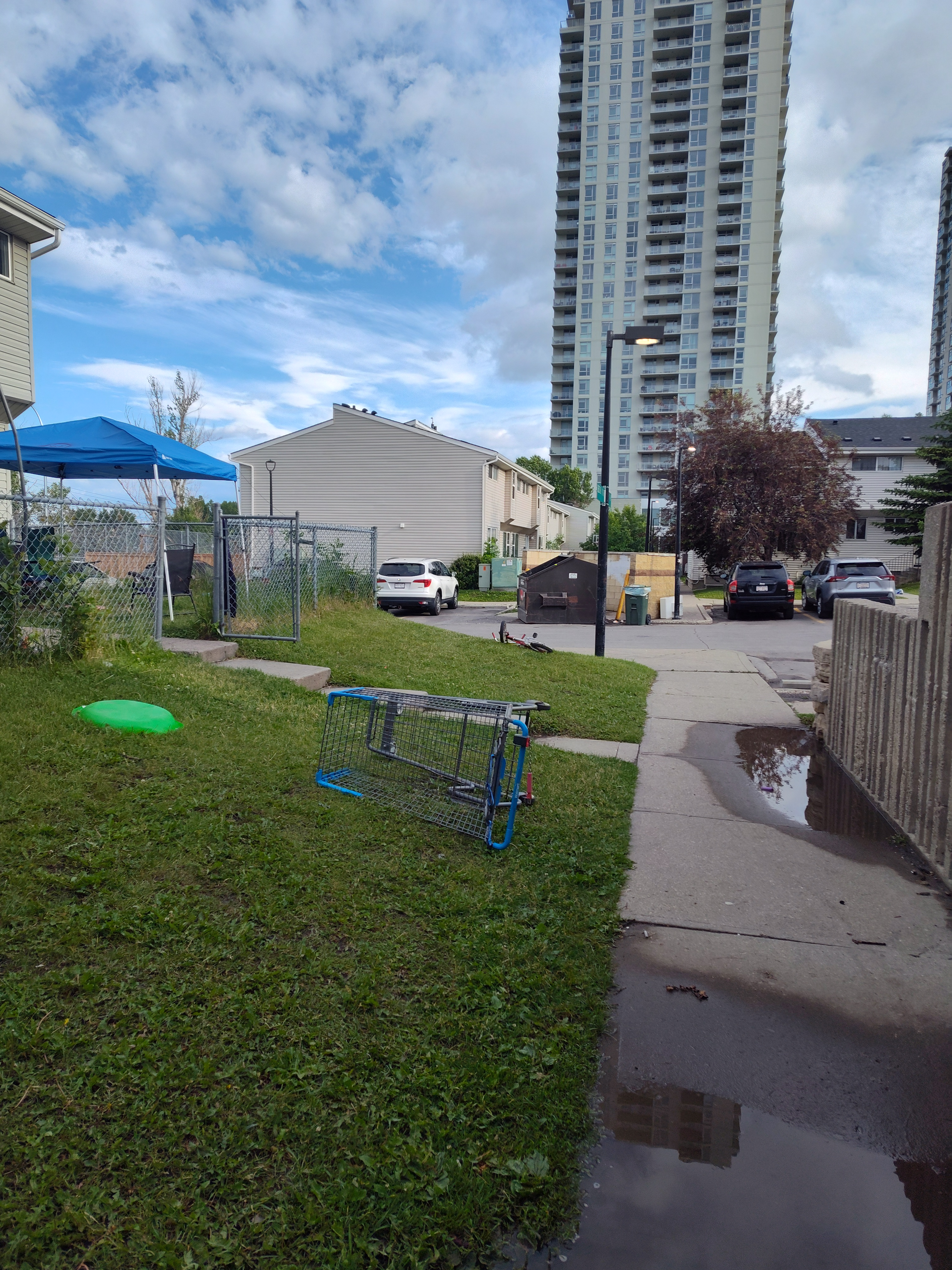
Spruce Cliff

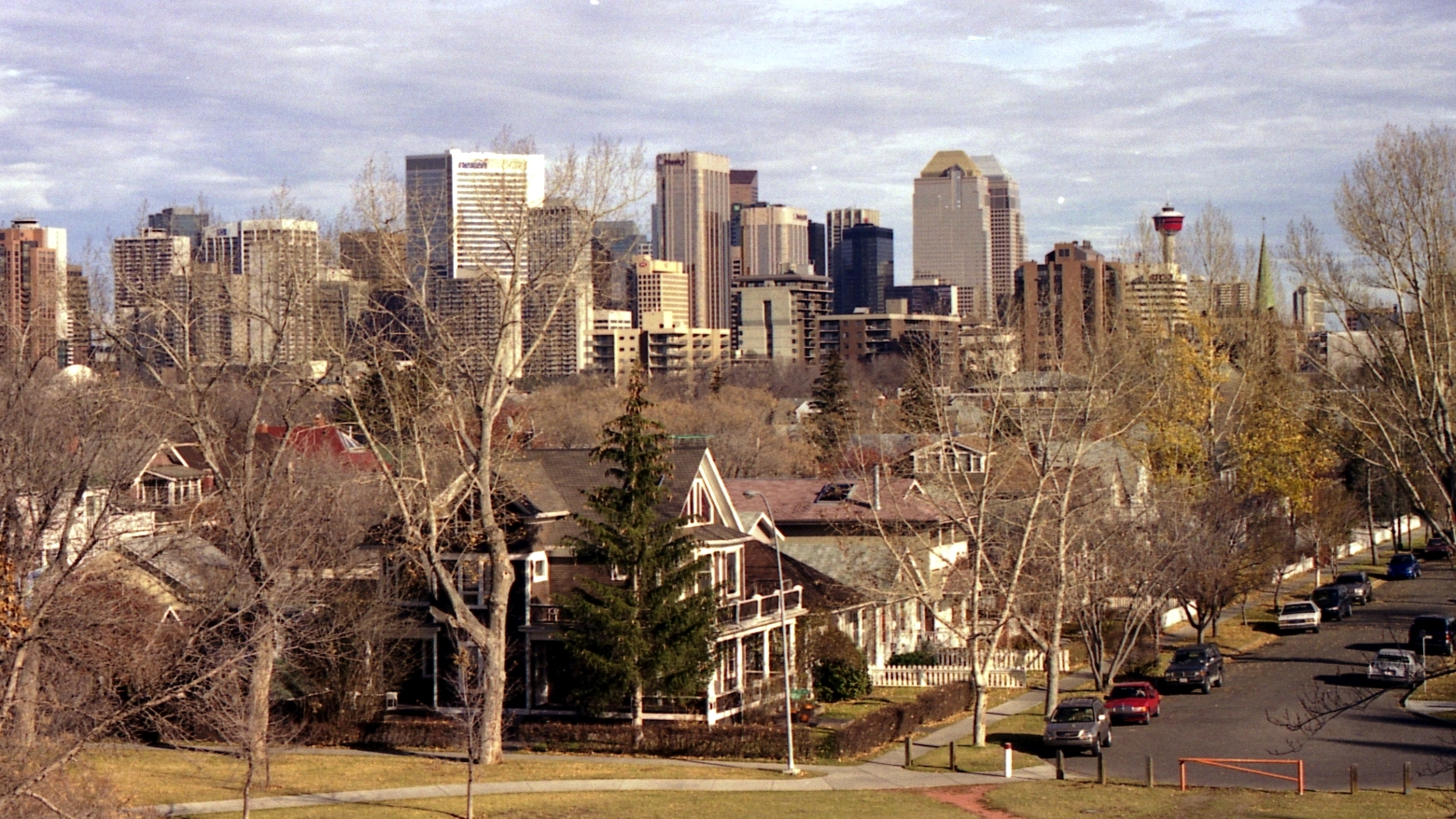
Sunalta

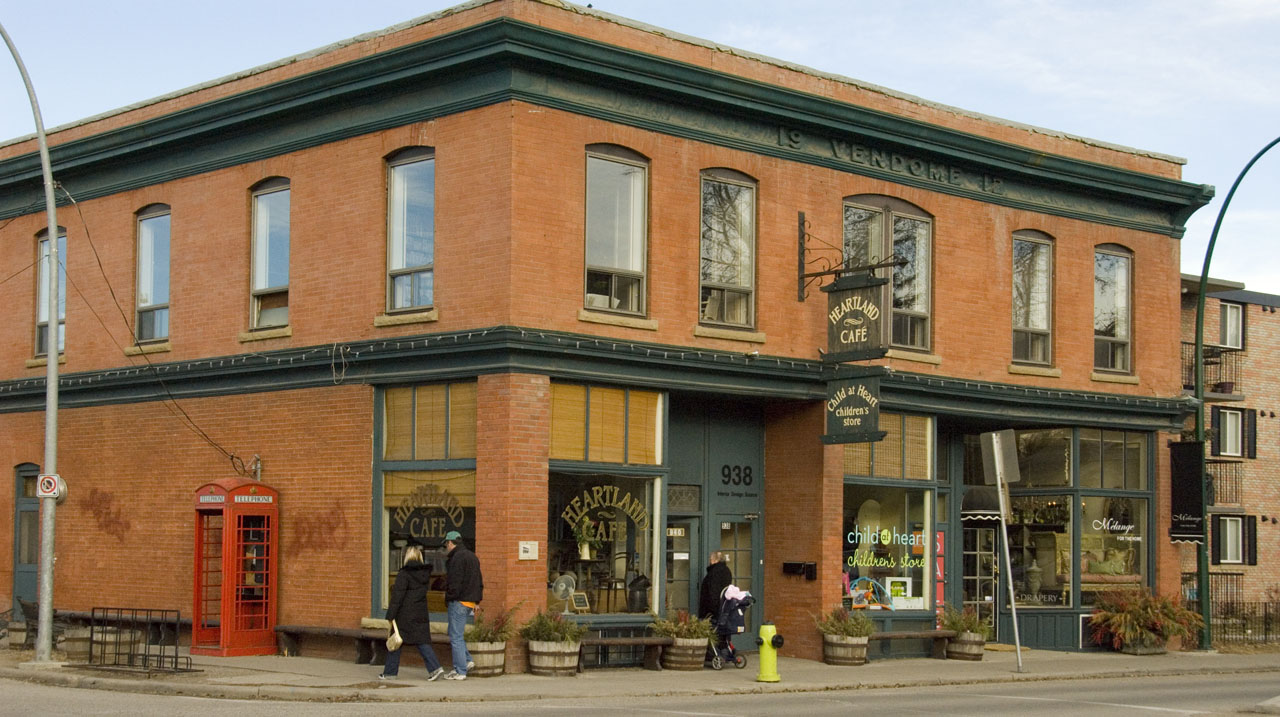
Sunnyside

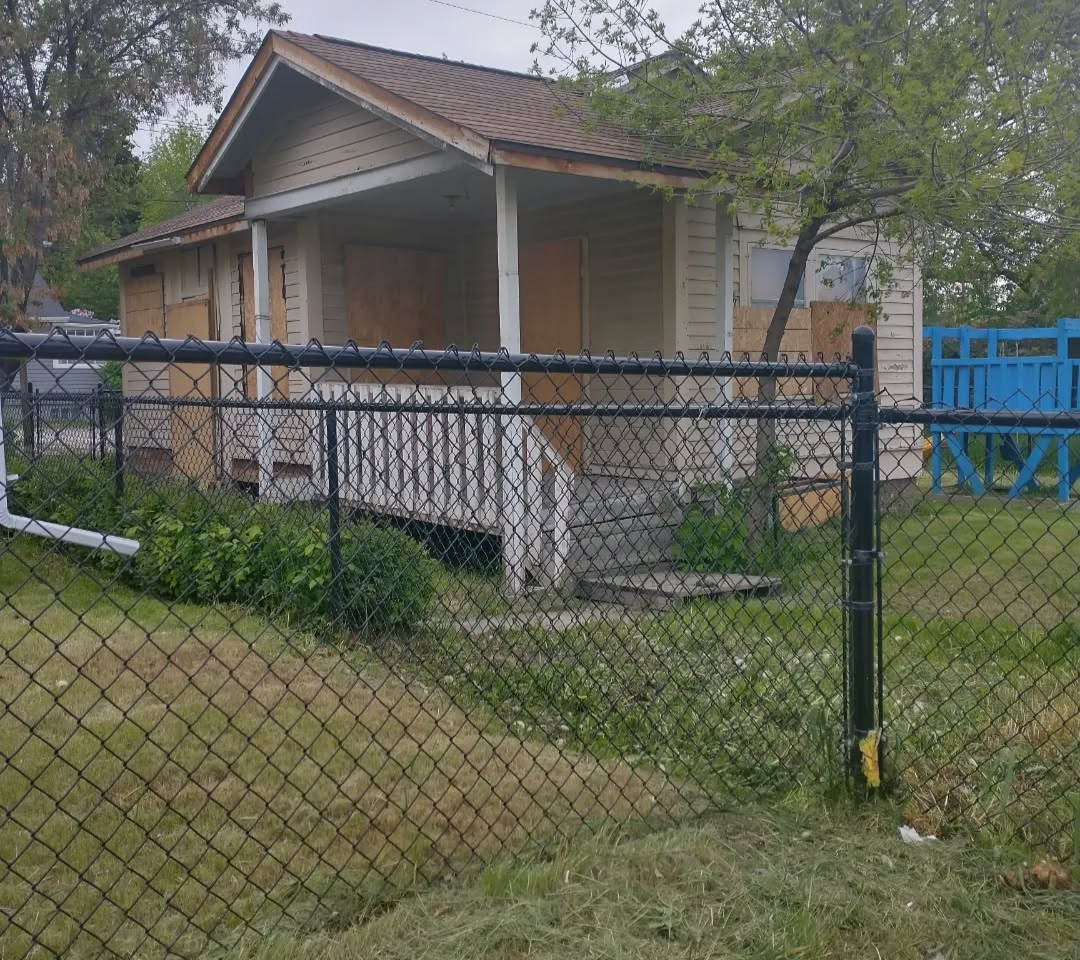
Tuxedo Park

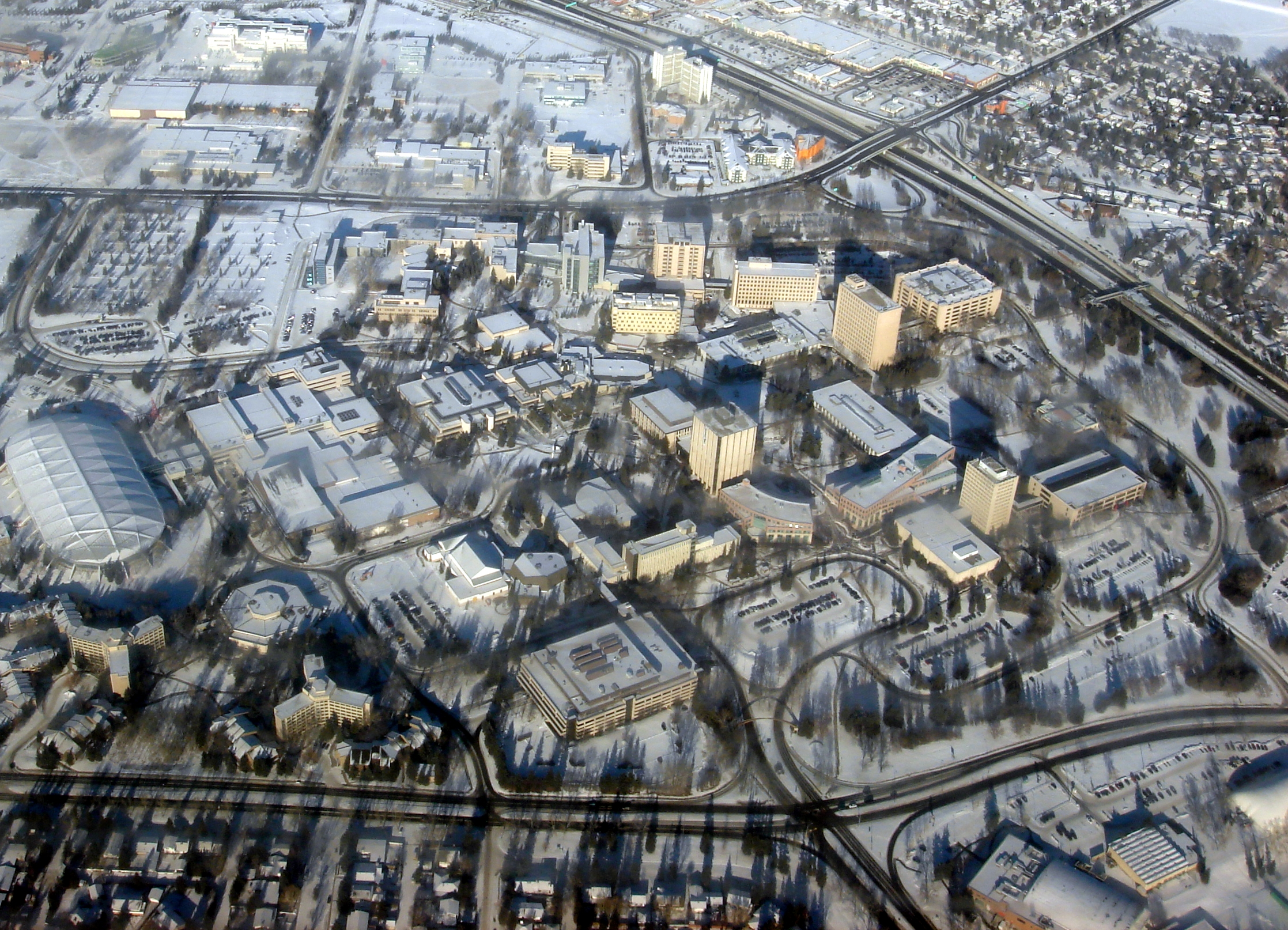
University of Calgary

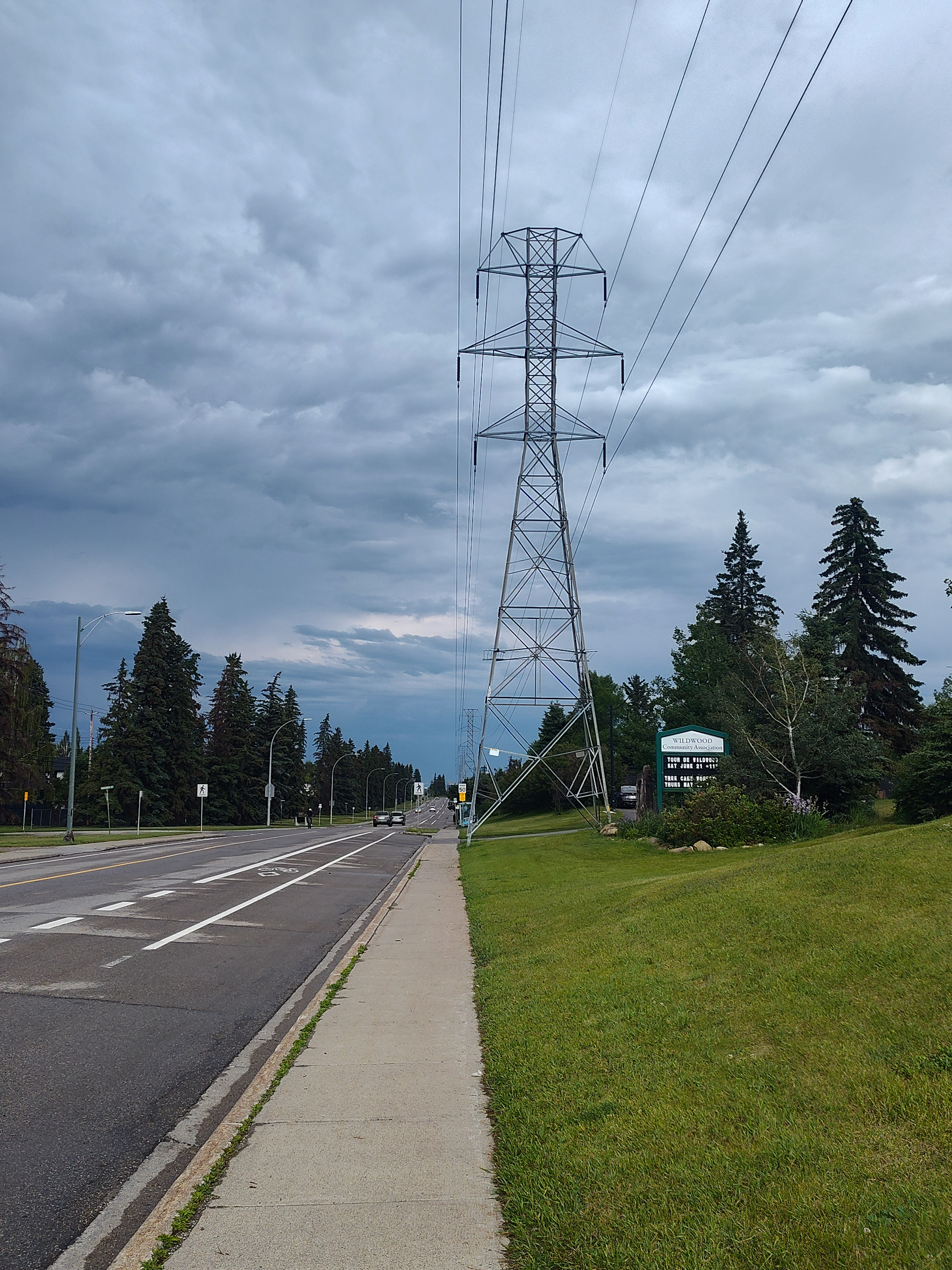
Wildwood

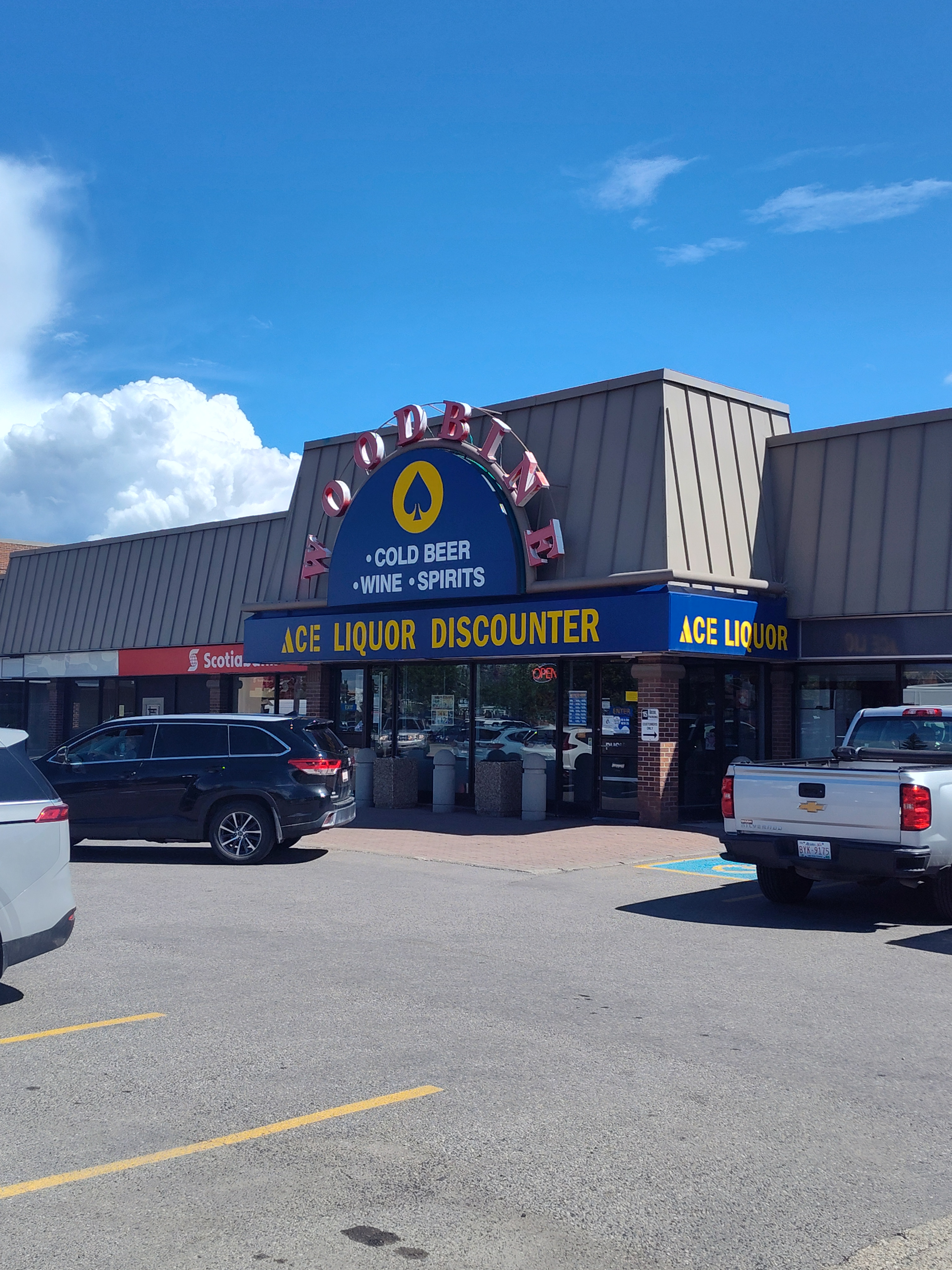
Woodbine

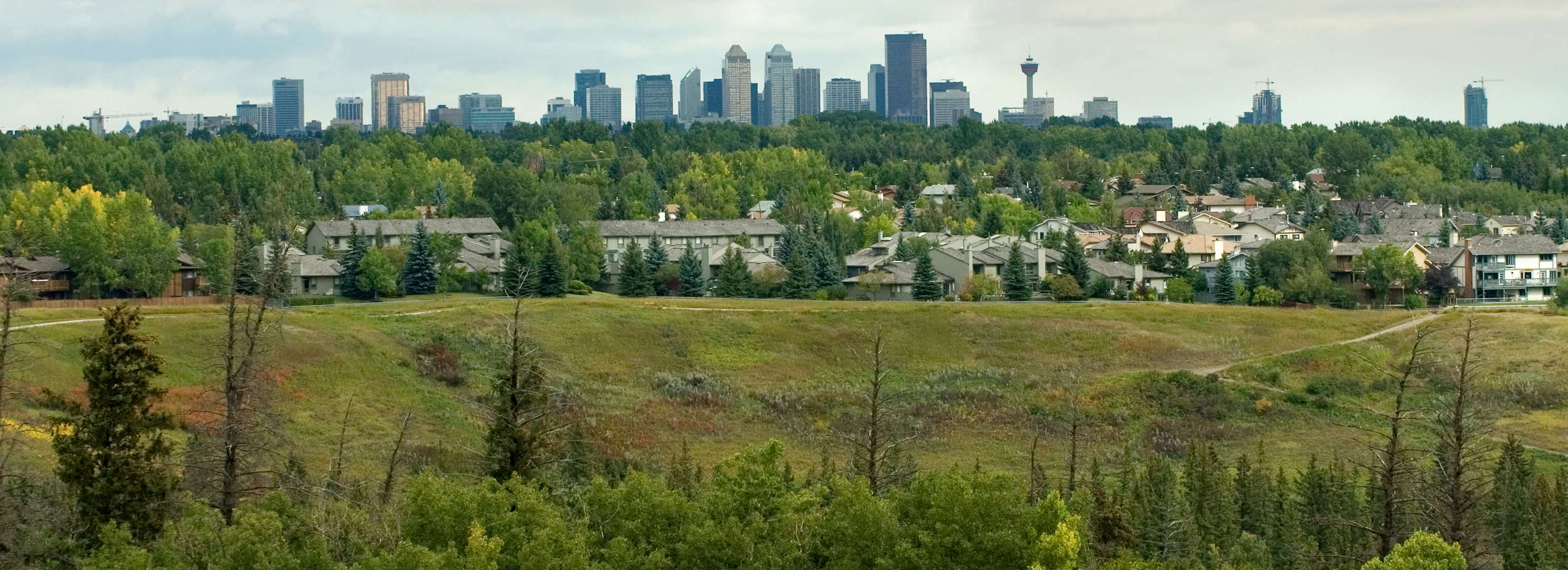
Woodlands

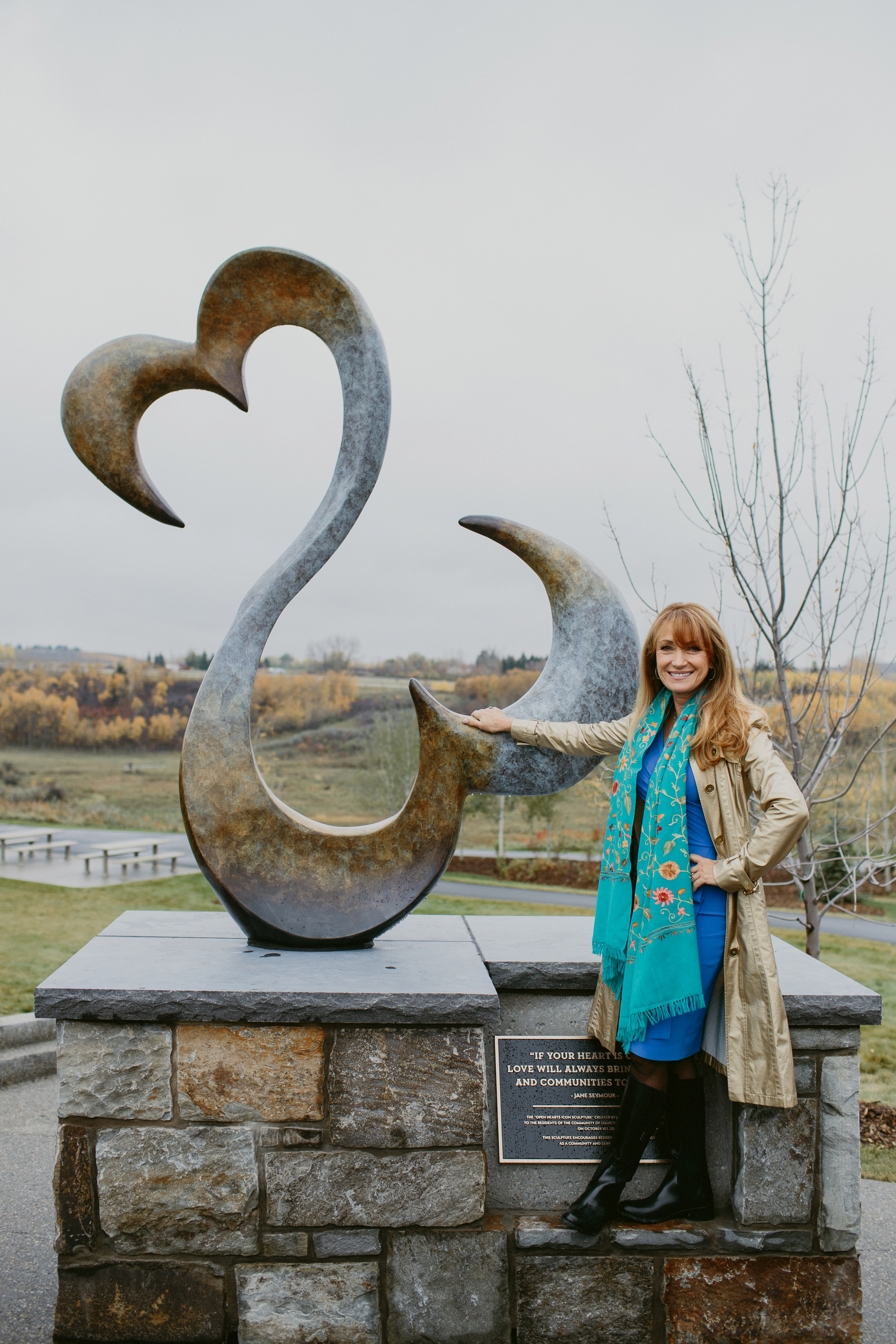
Jane Seymour's Open Hearts sculpture is located in Legacy

== See also ==
- Calgary (main article)
- List of neighbourhoods in Edmonton
