= Timeline of Calgary history =

Notable historical events of Calgary, Alberta

Coordinates: 51°02′42″N 114°03′26″W

This is a timeline of the history of Calgary, Alberta, Canada.

== 18th century ==
- 1787 – Cartographer David Thompson spent the winter with a band of Peigan encamped along the Bow River. He was the first recorded European to visit the area.

== 19th century ==
- 1870 – The future site of Calgary becomes part of Canada and of the North-West Territories.
- 1873 – John Glenn was the first documented European settler in the Calgary area.
- 1875 – Originally named Fort Brisebois, after NWMP officer Éphrem-A. Brisebois, it was renamed Fort Calgary by Colonel James Macleod.
- 1877 – Treaty 7 is signed, and title to the Fort Calgary area is ceded to the Crown.
- 1882 - First sawmill on the Bow River.
- 1883 – The Canadian Pacific Railway reached the area and a rail station was constructed.
- 1884 – Calgary was officially incorporated as a town and elected its first mayor, George Murdoch.
- 1885 – Calgary Police Service established.
- 1886 – The Calgary Fire of 1886.
- 1886 - Mayor Murdoch versus magistrate Travis controversy
- 1888 – Anglican Diocese of Calgary established.
- 1891 – Calgary and Edmonton Railway opened, connecting Calgary to South Edmonton (Strathcona).
- 1894 – "The City of Calgary" incorporated, in what was then the North-West Territories.
- 1900 – Downtown East Village, Calgary established.

== 20th century ==
- 1910
  - Parkdale is annexed to the City of Calgary.
  - The 103rd Calgary Rifles is created.
- 1912 – The Calgary Stampede is held for the first time.
- 1913 – City surpasses 50,000 residents
- 1914 - Discovery of oil at nearby Turner Valley created boosterism and speculative investments in Calgary. Later when the oilfield's gas was flared off, the light from the flares illuminated Calgary's streets at night.
- 1915–18 – The Mewata Armouries are constructed.
- 1917 - Calgary became first city in Canada to use a form of proportional representation (single transferable voting) to elect its city councillors. Hannah Gale, Calgary's first female councillor, elected. STV in use until 1961, then again in 1971. During this time, the mayor and other single-person posts were filled using instant-runoff voting.
- 1919
  - The Victory Stampede was Calgary's second rodeo, honoring the end of the Great War.
  - One Big Union is formed at Calgary.
  - General strike takes place in Calgary. related to the longer Winnipeg general strike. The Calgary strike was a chapter of the Canadian Labour Revolt.
- 1920 - The 103rd Rifles is reorganized as The Calgary Regiment.
- 1921 - Calgary filled its two House of Commons seats with Labour Party candidates -William Irvine and Joseph Tweed Shaw.
- 1923 – The Calgary Stampede held for the third time and annually since then.
- 1924 - The Calgary Highlanders split from the Calgary Regiment to become its own regiment.
- 1926 March Public school board trustees Geoffrey Silvester and Frederick Selwood lost seats through citizen recalls. Both defeated in subsequent by-elections held March 31, when two Labour candidates were elected to replace them.
- 1926 - 1926 Alberta election. Calgary MLAs elected using single transferable voting in city-wide district. STV in use in Calgary until 1956.
- 1932 - Co-operative Commonwealth Federation party formed at meeting in Calgary.
- 1933 - William Aberhart, principal of Crescent Heights High School and leader of the Calgary Prophetic Bible Institute, formed the Social Credit League. The party went on to win majority of seats in the Alberta Legislature in 1935.
- 1932–33 – The Glenmore Dam is constructed.
- 1945 - The current Calgary Stampeders of the Canadian Football League begin play.
- 1946 – City surpasses 100,000 residents
- 1947 – Stampede Wrestling established.
- 1948 - The Calgary Regiment renamed The King's Own Calgary Regiment
- 1955 - last provincial election where Calgary MLAs elected through STV. No CCF or NDP MLAs elected in Calgary under first-past-the-post voting until 1986.
- 1967 – Construction of the Husky Tower started. Opened to the public on June 30, 1968.
- 1970 – First +15 enclosed pedestrian walkway constructed downtown.
- 1971 - last election where Calgary city councillors elected through single transferable voting, and mayor through instant-runoff voting
- 1978 – City surpasses 500,000 residents
- 1980 - The NHL's Calgary Flames begin play after relocating from Atlanta.
- 1981 – The CTrain began operation.
- 1984 – Suncor Energy Centre completed construction and becomes the new tallest building in Calgary.
- 1988 – Calgary hosts the 1988 Winter Olympics.
- 1989
  - Bankers Hall-East completed construction.
  - The Flames win the Stanley Cup, the only time a visiting team has won the Stanley Cup in Montreal.
- 1992 – Stephen Avenue is designated as a National Historic Site of Canada.
- 1996 – Canadian Pacific Railway moves its head office from Montreal to Calgary.
- 1997
  - World Police and Fire Games
  - Calgary Declaration
- 1999 – Hub Oil explosion killed two.
- 2000 – Bankers Hall-West is completed 11 years after its twin.

== 21st century ==
- 2002 – J26 G8 Protests
- 2007 – City surpasses 1,000,000 residents.
- 2010 – After 26 years, the Suncor Energy Centre is surpassed by The Bow as tallest building in Calgary.
- 2011 – Eighth Avenue Place I completed construction.
- 2013 – Widespread flooding across southern Alberta forces the evacuation of 75,000 Calgary residents.
- 2018 – Brookfield Place East is completed and becomes the new tallest building in Calgary.
- 2018 – The Calgary bid for the 2026 Winter Olympics is withdrawn after a failed city-wide plebiscite.
- 2020 – COVID-19 pandemic in Calgary.

== List of riots and civil unrest in Calgary ==
The following is a timeline of riots and civil unrest in Calgary, Alberta. Since its incorporation as a town in 1884, like other cities, Calgary has had to deal with a variety of violence. Calgary has been credited with maintaining relative civility during duress. The Great Depression in Canada has received particular attention from sociologists and historians, including Thomas Thorner and Neil Watson who wrote, "There is little question that Calgary experienced its share of civil strife during the Depression. Battles between police and the single unemployed men, full scale riots and threats to blow up public buildings appear to have been almost annual events." According to Stephen Graham, a professor of Human Geography at Durham University, recent events have seen the City of Calgary change their tactics towards civil unrest activities such as protests.

=== Events ===
Riots and civil unrest in Calgary, Alberta, Canada in chronological order
Date	Issue	Event
August 2, 1892	Racial tension	A race riot ensued after members of the Chinese community were blamed for a smallpox outbreak. City authorities burned a laundry where a Chinese worker contracted the disease, and its occupants were quarantined. Nine Chinese contracted the disease, and three died. Alleging the spread was caused by unhygienic living conditions, a mob of over 300 men smashed doors and windows of all the Chinese laundries, destroyed and looted property, and assaulted Chinese residents. As the riot ended, police arrived. Many in the Chinese community sought refuge at the North-West Mounted Police barracks or in the homes of clergymen. The NWMP patrolled Calgary continuously for the next 3 weeks to protect Chinese Calgarians.
July 16, 1902	Labour unrest	The Calgary Trades and Labour Council hosts a demonstration with several thousand participants in support of local labour.
February 10, 1916 (during World War I)	Ethnic and labour tension	An anti-German riot destroys the Riverside Hotel at 4 Street S.E. and Boulevard Avenue. It reportedly started because the owner was German. During the same month 500 servicemen and civilians destroy Nagel's White Lunch Cafe after the owner reportedly hired an Austrian immigrant instead of a returning soldier.
October 11, 1916 (during World War I)	Military unrest	Soldiers from the 218th Battalion of the Canadian Expeditionary Force, or CEF, overcame the local police. "The city virtually is in the hands of the soldier mob" Morris "Two Gun" Cohen was implicated as a leader of the events during a series of trials held in the city; however, he was acquitted after successfully defending himself in court.
February 8, 1917	Military unrest	Soldiers from the former 218th Battalion of the CEF having been relocated from Calgary to Edmonton, rioted on 101 Street after being ordered to depart immediately for Europe. They attacked 14 stores, restaurants and cafes throughout the city.
January 1918 (during the Great Labour Revolt	Labour unrest	Calgary freight handlers go on strike in defiance of a federal ban on strikes. Civic workers, street railway workers and teamsters walked out in sympathy. Five strike leaders were arrested, paving the way towards the creation of the One Big Union.
May 1919	Labour unrest	After the formation of the One Big Union in Calgary in March 1919, the Calgary General Strike was held in solidarity with the Winnipeg General Strike. There was almost a full stoppage of local government, industrial and commercial activities in the city after thousands of workers stopped work for more than a month.
January 1926	Unemployment	More than 40 protesters with the Central Council of the Unemployed were arrested by police after ordering meals and refusing to pay in protest of the city's refusal to provide relief for the homeless and jobless.
December 1926	Unemployment	300 protesters with the Central Council of the Unemployed marched on City Hall for "relief" in the form of places to sleep, food to eat and transportation to work sites.
June 30, 1931	Unemployment	After several days of "ominous silence" among Calgary's unemployed, a meeting was held between the National Unemployed Workers Association and members of the Calgary City Council. When the crowd gathered outside, it was told to disperse by the Calgary Police. They re-assembled in a nearby vacant lot called "Red Square." After a series of speeches, the crowd was told to disperse, and when they did not, police took away a popular speaker from the platform. A riot ensued, which a local newspaper referred to saying, "It appears to have come to a showdown; the authority of the city is challenged which must be met decisively."
June 10, 1935	Unemployment	Hundreds of protesters participating in the On-to-Ottawa Trek took hostages at the Calgary Relief Office for several hours before continuing out of the city. Prime Minister R.B. Bennett decided not to take action against the trekkers in Calgary. Hundreds more unemployed, some from Edmonton, joined the Trek as it left the city. The Trek was brutally disbanded in Regina several weeks later.
1940	Racial tension	A group of 300 white soldiers rioted in Calgary's "Harlemtown" near the railway tracks east of downtown. After they invaded the home of a black band leader, military police intervened and were credited with ending the incident.
November 28, 1974	Racial tension	The Calgary Urban Treaty Indian Alliance held a demonstration over social service funding in which dozens of men, women and children occupied the Indian Affairs office in the city. Government officials labeled the participants "terrorists". The local papers charged the protesters with "public mischief" and civil infractions. While charges were not lodged against demonstrators, several reported increased government discrimination against them afterward.
December 2, 1983	Sporting disruption	A riot broke out during a Stampede Wrestling match at the Victoria Pavilion. Speaking of the events, announcer Ed Whalen remarked, "We're starting to scare the patrons with this violence outside the ring, and I will not be associated with it anymore." The event led to Stampede Wrestling being banned from Calgary for six months by the city's wrestling and boxing commission, and within a year the operation was sold to the World Wrestling Federation.
October 25, 1993	Education	2,000 students walkout of Calgary's schools to protest cuts to education, causing public disruption and raising awareness about the situation in education funding.
June 11–15, 2000	Anti-globalization	2,000 protesters participated in a "carnivalesque" atmosphere at the World Petroleum Congress while 1,500 police from a number of jurisdictions were involved in counter-protest operations. Other measures included, "police 'spotters' positioned on top of downtown office towers while helicopters busily circled overhead."
June 25–27, 2002	Anti-globalization	About 4000-5000 demonstrators participate in a variety of events throughout Calgary in protest of the Group of Eight, or G8, meeting in Kananaskis, Alberta.
March 21, 2008	Racial tension	The Aryan Guard staged a demonstration in downtown Calgary on Good Friday and United Nations International Day for the Elimination of Racism. More than 40 supporters of the Aryan Guard faced a crowd of more than 200 anti-racist protesters, including anarchists, communists and union leaders, who prevented the Guard from reaching their planned meeting place at the Mewata Armouries. Police then formed a human barrier between the two groups and blocked the movement of the counter-protesters while escorting the Aryan Guard down Stephen Avenue and up the steps of City Hall, where they waved flags proclaiming "White Pride Worldwide". Members of the Aryan Guard also taunted local anti-racism activists whose home was fire bombed on February 12, 2008, while they and their four children were inside.

== List of localities annexed ==
Through its various annexations, the following localities are now in Calgary.

- Academy
- Albert Park
- Altadore
- Barlow
- Barlow Junction
- Beddington
- Bel-Aire
- Bowness
- Brentwood
- Brickburn
- Bridgeland
- Britannia
- Calgary International Airport
- Cambrian Heights
- Camp Sarcee
- Capitol Hill
- Charleswood
- Collingwood
- Eagle Ridge
- Forest Lawn
- Glamorgan
- Glenbrook
- Glengarry
- Haysboro
- Heritage Woods Subdivision
- Hillhurst
- Hubalta
- Inglewood
- Keith
- Killarney
- Kingsland
- Lincoln Park
- Lynnwood
- Manchester
- Midnapore
- Montgomery
- Mount Royal
- Mount View
- North Haven
- Ogden
- Parkdale
- Princes Island
- Renfrew
- Rideau Park
- Rosscarrock
- Roxboro
- Sarcee Junction
- Saddle Ridge
- Shepard
- Silver Springs
- Simons Valley
- Southwood
- Spruce Cliff
- Spruce Meadows
- St. Andrews Heights
- St. Georges Heights
- St. George's Island
- St. Patrick's Island
- Stanley Park
- Sunalta
- Thorncliffe
- Turner
- Tuxedo Park
- Windsor Park
