= Calgary Signal Hill =

Federal electoral district in Alberta, Canada

Alberta electoral district
- Interactive map of riding boundaries from the 2025 federal election

Federal electoral district
- Legislature: House of Commons
MP
David McKenzie
Conservative
- District created: 2013
- First contested: 2015
- Last contested: 2021
- District webpage: profile, map

Demographics
- Population (2011): 109,647
- Electors (2019): 88,317
- Area (km²): 66
- Pop. density (per km²): 1,661.3
- Census division: Division No. 6
- Census subdivision: Calgary (part)

Calgary Signal Hill is a federal electoral district in Alberta, Canada, that has been represented in the House of Commons of Canada since 2015.

Calgary Signal Hill was created by the 2012 federal electoral boundaries redistribution and was legally defined in the 2013 representation order. It came into effect after the 2015 federal election was called. It was created out of parts of the electoral districts of Calgary West and Calgary Centre.

== Geography ==
The Calgary Signal Hill riding extends from the Bow River south to Glenmore Trail SW and from 101 St SW east to 37 St SW. It contains the neighbourhoods of Aspen Woods, Bowness, Christie Park, Coach Hill, Cougar Ridge, Crestmont, Discovery Ridge, Glamorgan, Glenbrook, Glendale, Patterson, Rosscarrock, Signal Hill, Springbank Hill, Spruce Cliff, Strathcona Park, The Slopes, Valley Ridge, Wentworth, Westgate, West Springs and Wildwood.

== Demographics ==
Panethnic groups in Calgary Signal Hill (2011−2021)
Panethnic group	2021		2016		2011	
Panethnic group	Pop.	%	Pop.	%	Pop.	%
European (Note: Statistic includes all persons that did not make up part of a visible minority or an indigenous identity.)	78,495	64.7%	82,420	68.68%	80,690	74.69%
East Asian (Note: Statistic includes total responses of "Chinese", "Korean", and "Japanese" under visible minority section on census.)	12,840	10.58%	10,795	9%	8,000	7.41%
South Asian	6,165	5.08%	5,315	4.43%	4,260	3.94%
Southeast Asian (Note: Statistic includes total responses of "Filipino" and "Southeast Asian" under visible minority section on census.)	5,625	4.64%	5,620	4.68%	4,295	3.98%
Middle Eastern (Note: Statistic includes total responses of "West Asian" and "Arab" under visible minority section on census.)	5,500	4.53%	4,545	3.79%	3,085	2.86%
African	4,540	3.74%	3,745	3.12%	2,345	2.17%
Indigenous	3,430	2.83%	3,215	2.68%	2,725	2.52%
Latin American	2,585	2.13%	2,395	2%	1,685	1.56%
Other/Multiracial (Note: Statistic includes total responses of "Visible minority, n.i.e." and "Multiple visible minorities" under visible minority section on census.)	2,155	1.78%	1,950	1.62%	950	0.88%
Total responses	121,320	98.78%	120,005	98.86%	108,035	98.53%
Total population	122,818	100%	121,392	100%	109,647	100%
Notes: Totals greater than 100% due to multiple origin responses. Demographics based on 2012 Canadian federal electoral redistribution riding boundaries.

== Members of Parliament ==
This riding has elected the following members of the House of Commons of Canada:

Parliament	Years	Member	Party
Calgary Signal Hill; Riding created from Calgary Centre and Calgary West
42nd	2015–2019	Ron Liepert	Conservative
43rd	2019–2021	Ron Liepert	Conservative
44th	2021–2025	Ron Liepert	Conservative
45th	2025–present	David McKenzie	Conservative

== Election results ==
View source data.
Graph of election results in Calgary Signal Hill (minor parties that never got 2% of the vote or didn't run consistently are omitted)

=== 2023 representation order ===
2025 Canadian federal election
Party	Candidate	Votes	%	±%	Expenditures
Conservative	David McKenzie	41,638	60.15	+0.34	$81,218.89
Liberal	Bryndis Whitson	25,174	36.37	+16.99	$69,626.67
New Democratic	Khalis Ahmed	1,656	2.39	–11.74	$1,579.18
People's	Grant Strem	492	0.71	–3.33	none listed
Canadian Future	Paul Godard	265	0.38	–	$4,450.24
Total valid votes/expense limit		69,225	99.45	–	$138,190.99
Total rejected ballots		382	0.55	+0.00	
Turnout		69,607	74.25	+6.81	
Eligible voters		93,742			
Conservative hold		Swing		–8.33	
Source: Elections Canada

2021 federal election redistributed results
Party	Vote	%
Conservative	35,055	59.81
Liberal	11,361	19.38
New Democratic	8,284	14.13
People's	2,368	4.04
Green	997	1.70
Others	546	0.93

=== 2013 representation order ===
2021 Canadian federal election
Party	Candidate	Votes	%	±%	Expenditures
Conservative	Ron Liepert	35,217	58.98	–11.00	$49,810.65
Liberal	Shawn Duncan	11,106	18.60	+3.28	$14,789.42
New Democratic	Patrick King	8,863	14.84	+6.40	none listed
People's	Nick Debrey	2,859	4.79	+3.01	$8,787.91
Green	Keiran Corrigall	1,094	1.83	–1.54	none listed
Maverick	Ajay Copp	568	0.95	–	$7,220.21
Total valid votes/expense limit		59,707	99.45	–	$117,837.82
Total rejected ballots		332	0.55	+0.17	
Turnout		60,039	67.44	–4.40	
Eligible voters		89,020			
Conservative hold		Swing		–7.14	
Source: Elections Canada

2019 Canadian federal election
Party	Candidate	Votes	%	±%	Expenditures
Conservative	Ron Liepert	44,421	69.98	+9.43	$50,605.41
Liberal	Ghada Alatrash	9,722	15.32	–15.24	$18,668.44
New Democratic	Khalis Ahmed	5,355	8.44	+3.44	$145.93
Green	Marco Reid	2,139	3.37	+0.83	$1,743.75
People's	Gord Squire	1,130	1.78	–	none listed
Rhinoceros	Christina Bassett	511	0.81	–	$977.40
Christian Heritage	Garry Dirk	200	0.32	+0.06	$7,255.71
Total valid votes/expense limit		63,478	99.62	–	$113,915.78
Total rejected ballots		241	0.38	+0.08	
Turnout		63,719	71.84	–1.48	
Eligible voters		88,690			
Conservative hold		Swing		+12.34	
Source: Elections Canada

2015 Canadian federal election
Party	Candidate	Votes	%	±%	Expenditures
Conservative	Ron Liepert	37,858	60.55	–4.33	$130,725.18
Liberal	Kerry Cundal	19,108	30.56	+15.12	$45,722.45
New Democratic	Khalis Ahmed	3,128	5.00	–5.58	$20,771.13
Green	Taryn Knorren	1,586	2.54	–6.24	$3,474.13
Libertarian	Tim Moen	679	1.09	–	$41,422.27
Christian Heritage	Jesse Rau	160	0.26	–	$5,538.70
Total valid votes/expense limit		62,519	99.70	–	$222,240.38
Total rejected ballots		189	0.30	–	
Turnout		62,708	73.32	–	
Eligible voters		85,530			
Conservative hold		Swing		–9.74	
Source: Elections Canada

2011 federal election redistributed results
Party	Vote	%
Conservative	29,199	64.93
Liberal	6,946	15.44
New Democratic	4,760	10.58
Green	3,948	8.78
Others	120	0.27

== See also ==
- List of Canadian electoral districts
- Historical federal electoral districts of Canada
