= Garrison Green, Calgary =

Garrison Green
- Neighbourhood
- Location of Garrison Green in Calgary
- Coordinates: 51°00′24″N 114°07′24″W
- Country: Canada
- Province: Alberta
- City: Calgary
- Quadrant: SW
- Ward: 11

Government
  - Mayor: Jeromy Farkas
  - Administrative body: Calgary City Council
  - Councillor: Rob Ward (Communities First)

Population (2012)
  - Total: 1,973
- Time zone: UTC-7 (Mountain)
- Area code: 403 587

Garrison Green is a residential neighbourhood in the southwest quadrant of Calgary, Alberta, Canada. It is located on former Canadian Forces Base (CFB) Calgary, bounded by Richardson Road SW to the west, Glenmore Trail (Highway 8) to the south, Crowchild Trail to the east, and the Lincoln Park community to the north. The neighbourhood is referred to as Lincoln Park South in the CFB West Master Plan and consists of the CFB Calgary's former Lincoln Park Permanent Marital Quarters (PMQ).

Garrison Green is located within Calgary City Council's Ward 11.

== Demographics ==
In the City of Calgary's 2012 municipal census, Garrison Green had a population of 1,973 living in 729 dwellings, a -0.6% increase from its 2011 population of 1,984. With a land area of 0.4 km^{2} (0.15 sq mi), it had a population density of 4,900/km^{2} (12,800/sq mi) in 2012.

== See also ==
- List of neighbourhoods in Calgary
