= Currie Barracks, Calgary =

Currie Barracks
- Neighbourhood
- Location of Currie Barracks in Calgary
- Coordinates: 51°01′05″N 114°07′29″W
- Country: Canada
- Province: Alberta
- City: Calgary
- Quadrant: SW
- Ward: 8

Government
  - Mayor: Jeromy Farkas
  - Administrative body: Calgary City Council
  - Councillor: Nathaniel Schmidt (Independent)

Population (2019)
  - Total: 1,262
- Time zone: UTC-7 (Mountain)
- Area code: 403 587

Currie Barracks is a residential neighbourhood in the southwest quadrant of Calgary, Alberta, Canada. It is located on former Canadian Forces Base (CFB) Calgary, named for General Sir Arthur Currie and bounded by the Lincoln Park community to the southwest, Sarcee Road SW to the west, 33 Avenue SW to the north, and Crowchild Trail to the east. Being part of former CFB Calgary, the neighbourhood is planned for redevelopment under the CFB West Master Plan by Canada Lands Company.

Currie Barracks is located within Calgary City Council's Ward 8.

== Demographics ==
In the City of Calgary's 2019 municipal census, Currie Barracks had a population of 1,262 living in 617 dwellings, a 733% increase from its 2012 population of 172. With a land area of 1.1 km^{2} (0.42 sq mi), it had a population density of 156/km^{2} (405/sq mi) in 2012.

== See also ==
- List of neighbourhoods in Calgary
