= Cornerstone, Calgary =

Cornerstone
- Neighbourhood
- Location of Cornerstone in Calgary
- Coordinates: 51°09′46″N 113°56′45″W
- Country: Canada
- Province: Alberta
- City: Calgary
- Quadrant: NE

Government
  - Mayor: Jeromy Farkas
  - Administrative body: Calgary City Council
  - Councillor: Raj Dhaliwal (Independent)

Population (2021)
  - Total: 6,190
- Time zone: UTC-7 (Mountain)
- Area code: 403 587
- Website: https://liveatcornerstone.ca/

Cornerstone is a residential neighbourhood in the northeast quadrant of Calgary, Alberta, Canada. Located near the north edge of the city, it is bounded by the Skyview Ranch and Redstone communities to the west, Stoney Trail NE to the north, Calgary, Cityscape Community to the south, and Cornerstone Close Northeast Road to the east.

The Cornerstone Community is master-planned by Walton Development and Management.

Cornerstone is located within Calgary City Council's Ward 5.

In 2018, Walton Development and Management partnered with Anthem United to manage the development. The day-to-day duties were formally transferred as of March 28, 2018.

== Demographics ==
As of the 2021 Calgary municipal census, Cornerstone had a population of 6,190, and 1,795 dwellings.

Residents in Cornerstone had a median household income of $99,000, and 6% of residents living in Cornerstone were low-income. As of 2021, 61% of residents were immigrants, 20% of housing were condominiums or apartments, and 17% of housing was used for renting. 34% of residents in Cornerstone spent 30%+ of their income on housing, compared to the Calgary average of 23%.

== See also ==
- List of neighbourhoods in Calgary
