= Mount Pleasant, Calgary =

Mount Pleasant
- Neighbourhood
- Location of Mount Pleasant in Calgary
- Coordinates: 51°04′21″N 114°04′35″W
- Country: Canada
- Province: Alberta
- City: Calgary
- Quadrant: NW
- Ward: 7
- Established: 1912
- Annexed: 1910

Government
  - Mayor: Jeromy Farkas
  - Administrative body: Calgary City Council
  - Councillor: Myke Atkinson (Independent)

Area
  - Total: 1.8 km^{2} (0.69 sq mi)
- Elevation: 1,090 m (3,580 ft)

Population (2006)
  - Total: 4,803
  - Average Income: $48,334
- Website: Mount Pleasant Community Association

Mount Pleasant is a residential neighbourhood in the northwest quadrant of Calgary, Alberta. It is located immediately north of the Trans-Canada Highway and the community of Rosedale. To the north and west it is bounded by Confederation Park.

It is represented in the Calgary City Council by the Ward 7 councillor.

== Demographics ==
In the City of Calgary's 2012 municipal census, Mount Pleasant had a population of 4,851 living in 2,654 dwellings, a 2.8% increase from its 2011 population of 4,718. With a land area of 1.9 km^{2} (0.73 sq mi), it had a population density of 2,550/km^{2} (6,610/sq mi) in 2012.

Residents in this community had a median household income of $48,334 in 2000, and there were 15.3% low income residents living in the neighbourhood. As of 2000, 14.4% of the residents were immigrants. A proportion of 24.7% of the buildings were condominiums or apartments, and 40.4% of the housing was used for renting.

== Crime ==
Crime Data
Year	Crime Rate (/100 pop.)
2018	4.1
2019	5.0
2020	4.0
2021	3.0
2022	4.2
2023	2.7

== See also ==
- List of neighbourhoods in Calgary
