= Greenwood/Greenbriar =

- Neighbourhood
- Location of Greenwood/Greenbriar in Calgary
- Coordinates: 51°05′26″N 114°13′26″W
- Country: Canada
- Province: Alberta
- City: Calgary
- Quadrant: NW
- Ward: 1
- Established: 1911

Government
  - Mayor: Jeromy Farkas
  - Administrative body: Calgary City Council
  - Councillor: Kim Tyers (Communities First)
- Elevation: 1,120 m (3,670 ft)

Population (2016)
  - Total: 905
  - Average Income: $54,638
- Website: Greenwood/Greenbriar Community Association

Greenwood/Greenbriar is a residential neighbourhood in the northwest quadrant of Calgary, Alberta. It is bounded by the Trans-Canada Highway to the south, the Bow River to the north, Stoney Trail to the west and the community of Bowness to the east. Canada Olympic Park borders the neighbourhood to the south. The community consists primarily of a mobile home park, Greenwood Village; maps since the early 1980s have shown proposed streets south of the mobile home park and north of the Trans-Canada Highway, but as of 2019 development had begun on a community named Greenwich that would primarily include semi-detached homes, commercial businesses & restaurants.

It is represented in the Calgary City Council by the Ward 1 councillor.

== Demographics ==
In the City of Calgary's 2016 municipal census, Greenwood/Greenbriar had a population of 905 living in 485 dwellings, a 4.3% decrease from its 2012 population of 946. With a land area of 1.2 km^{2} (0.46 sq mi), it had a population density of 750/km^{2} (1,950/sq mi) in 2016.

Residents in this community had a median household income of $54,638 in 2016, and there were 15% low income residents living in the neighbourhood. As of 2016, 8% of the residents were immigrants. All buildings were single-family detached homes or mobile homes, and 15% of the housing was used for renting.

== See also ==
- List of neighbourhoods in Calgary
