= Panorama Hills, Calgary =

Panorama Hills
- Neighbourhood
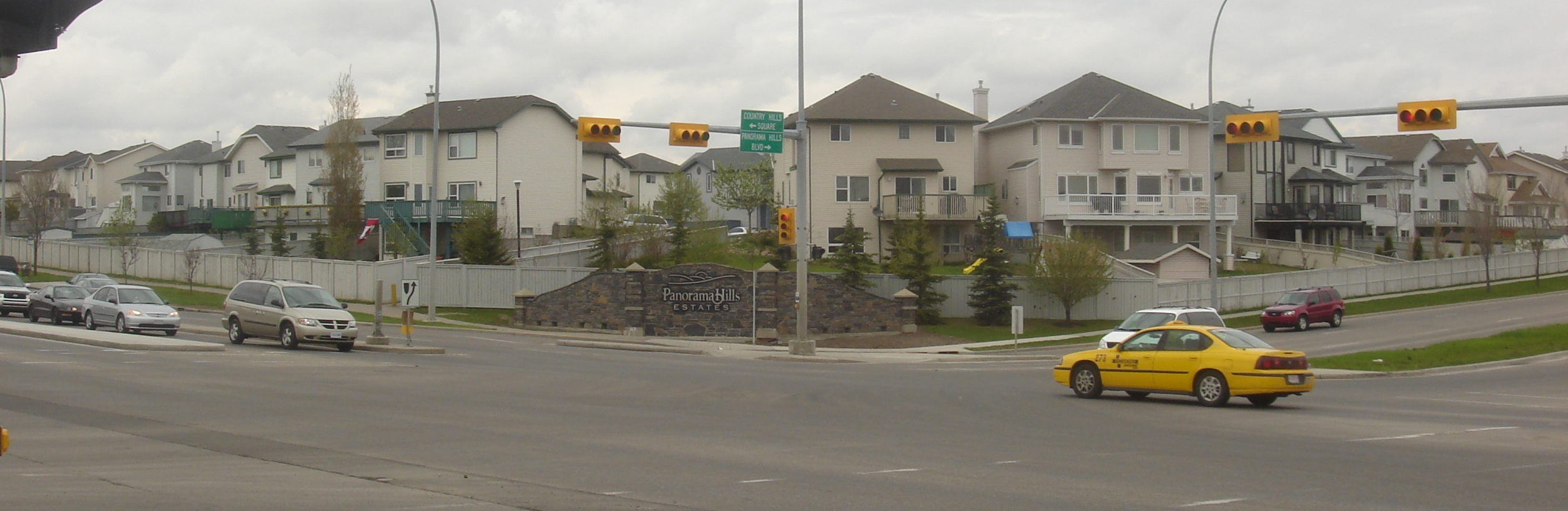
- Panorama Hills

- Location of Panorama Hills in Calgary
- Coordinates: 51°09′15″N 114°04′17″W
- Country: Canada
- Province: Alberta
- City: Calgary
- Quadrant: NW
- Ward: 3
- Established: 1994

Government
  - Mayor: Jeromy Farkas
  - Administrative body: Calgary City Council
  - Councillor: Andrew Yule (Independent)
- Elevation: 1,115 m (3,658 ft)

Population (2019)
  - Total: 25,710

Demographics
  - Average Income: $90,859
- Time zone: UTC−7 (MST)
  - Summer (DST): UTC−6 (MDT)
- Website: Northern Hills Community Association

Panorama Hills is a suburban residential neighbourhood in the northwest quadrant of Calgary, Alberta, Canada. It is located on the northern edge of the city, bounded by Country Hills Boulevard to the south, Harvest Hills Boulevard to the east, and Stoney Trail (Highway 201) to the north and west. The neighbourhood of Coventry Hills is directly to the east, across Harvest Hills Boulevard.

Panorama Hills was established in 1994, built by Ultima Development Corporation on land purchased from members of the Country Hills Golf Course. It is represented in the Calgary City Council by the Ward 3 councillor.

The historical sites Reverend George McDougall Cairn and the John A. Lewis Rock Quarry are located within the neighbourhood, and it borders the Country Hills golf course to the southwest.

== Demographics ==
In the City of Calgary's 2019 municipal census, Panorama Hills had a population of 25,710 living in 8,199 dwellings, a 29.5% increase from its 2011 population of 19,851. With a land area of 6.3 km^{2} (2.4 sq mi), it had a population density of 4,080/km^{2} (10,570/sq mi) in 2019.

Residents in this community had a median household income of $89,044 in 2005, and there were 5.2% low income residents living in the neighbourhood. As of 2006, 41.7% of the residents were immigrants. Most buildings are single-family detached homes, and 2.3% of the housing was used for renting.

== Developers ==
Multiple developers have built projects within the community including Jayman Built, Cedarglen Homes, Shane Homes, Homes by Avi and Cardel Homes.

== Education ==
Students in the Catholic district attend St. Jerome Elementary School, St Elizabeth Seton and Notre Dame (10-12) High School. Students in the public district attend Panorama Hills Elementary School (K-5), Buffalo Rubbing Stone Elementary School (K-5), Dr. J. K. Mulloy Elementary School (K-4), Balmoral School (5-9), Captain Nichola Goddard Middle School (6-9), Sir John A Macdonald Junior High School, John G. Diefenbaker High School (10-12), and North Trail High School (10-12).

== See also ==
- List of neighbourhoods in Calgary
