= Shaganappi =

Shaganappi, from the Cree word shâkanâpiy, meaning a "thin-narrow cord", describing the shape of a rawhide thong or lacing. Red River ox carts were held together by bison hide lacings known as shaganappi.

The word may also refer to:

- Shaganappi, Calgary, a neighbourhood in Calgary
- Shaganappi Trail, an arterial road in Calgary's Northwest quadrant
- Shaginappi Lodge #61, a former lodge of the Order of the Arrow, (Scouting's national honor society). In 1974 it merged with another lodge.
