= McKenzie Towne, Calgary =

McKenzie Towne
- Neighbourhood
- Location of McKenzie Towne in Calgary
- Coordinates: 50°54′49″N 113°58′9″W
- Country: Canada
- Province: Alberta
- City: Calgary
- Quadrant: SE
- Ward: 12
- Established: 1995

Government
  - Mayor: Jeromy Farkas
  - Administrative body: Calgary City Council
  - Councillor: Mike Jamieson (A Better Calgary)

Area
  - Total: 4.3 km^{2} (1.7 sq mi)
- Elevation: 1,030 m (3,380 ft)

Population (2011)
  - Total: 17,737
  - Average Income: $75,325
- Website: McKenzie Towne

McKenzie Towne is a master planned residential neighbourhood in the southeast of Calgary, Alberta being developed by Carma Developers LP (now Brookfield Residential Properties Inc.). The community is bordered on the west by Deerfoot Trail, on the south by Stoney Trail, on the east by 52 St. S.E., and to the north by the South Trail regional commercial centre along 130 Ave. S.E.

McKenzie Towne boasts many recreational features, including: the McKenzie Towne Hall managed and operated by the staff and Board of Directors of the McKenzie Towne Council (which is the community's Residents' Association). Within the Hall: a gymnasium, meeting and banquet facilities, and a private outdoor park area. The Council offers recreational programming for children, youth, families adults and seniors, as well as facility rentals for events. The Council also runs community events and looks after the landscaping and maintenance of green spaces and amenities. The community also has a network of paved pathways, green spaces and parks; a fountain and splash park; an outdoor hockey rink and skate park and numerous ponds also complement McKenzie Towne. McKenzie Towne also contains one separate school board elementary school and a public elementary school.

== Developments ==
McKenzie Towne is a master planned Neotraditional Community, reflecting a small town. It comes complete with both street front retail, midsize commercial offerings, a wide variety of single family homes, apartments, town houses, churches, seniors care facilities, public and separate board elementary schools, and traditional architecture. The neighbourhood was based on the new urbanist movement and original concepts were crafted by Andres Duany who was the same architect to model Seaside, Florida (the filming location of The Truman Show movie). McKenzie Towne was selected by the Urban Land Institute as one of the top 26 master planned communities in the world.

The neighbourhood is divided into four distinct areas: Inverness, Elgin, Prestwick, and High Street. Each of the three areas of McKenzie Towne offer complementing architectural styles. Elgin features six styles of architecture designed to reflect Europe. English Cottage, Greek Revival, English Tudor, French Eclectic, Italianate, and English Arts & Crafts. Prestwick and Inverness follows four styles: Queen Anne (Victorian), Georgian, Craftsman, and National. High Street is the commercial area, designed by Gibbs Gage Architects. It features street oriented commercial with many small businesses and complemented with larger well known retail tenants and a major grocery store.

== Education ==
There are three schools in McKenzie Towne, the Calgary Catholic School District has St. Albert The Great (K-9) in the community. Calgary Board of Education has two schools in the community McKenzie Towne Elementary (K-4) and a McKenzie Highlands School (5-9).

== Demographics ==
In the City of Calgary's 2012 municipal census, McKenzie Towne had a population of 16,102 living in 6,783 dwellings, a 4.6% increase from its 2011 population of 15,395. With a land area of 4.8 km^{2} (1.9 sq mi), it had a population density of 3,350/km^{2} (8,690/sq mi) in 2012.

Residents in this community had a median household income of $75,325 in 2000, and there were 4.6% low income residents living in the neighbourhood. As of 2000, 11.9% of the residents were immigrants. A proportion of 8.9% of the buildings were condominiums or apartments, and 4% of the housing was used for renting.

== Commercial development ==
The main commercial area within McKenzie Towne is the High Street shopping area, a streetscape-style shopping centre anchored at present by a Sobeys grocery store and a number of smaller chain and independent retail outlets and restaurants. The major big-box shopping district South Trail Crossing is located along 130th Avenue S.E. along the northern boundary of the Prestwick district and features major retailers such as Wal-Mart. Additional smaller neighbourhood retail is located at several other locations within McKenzie Towne.

== Transit ==
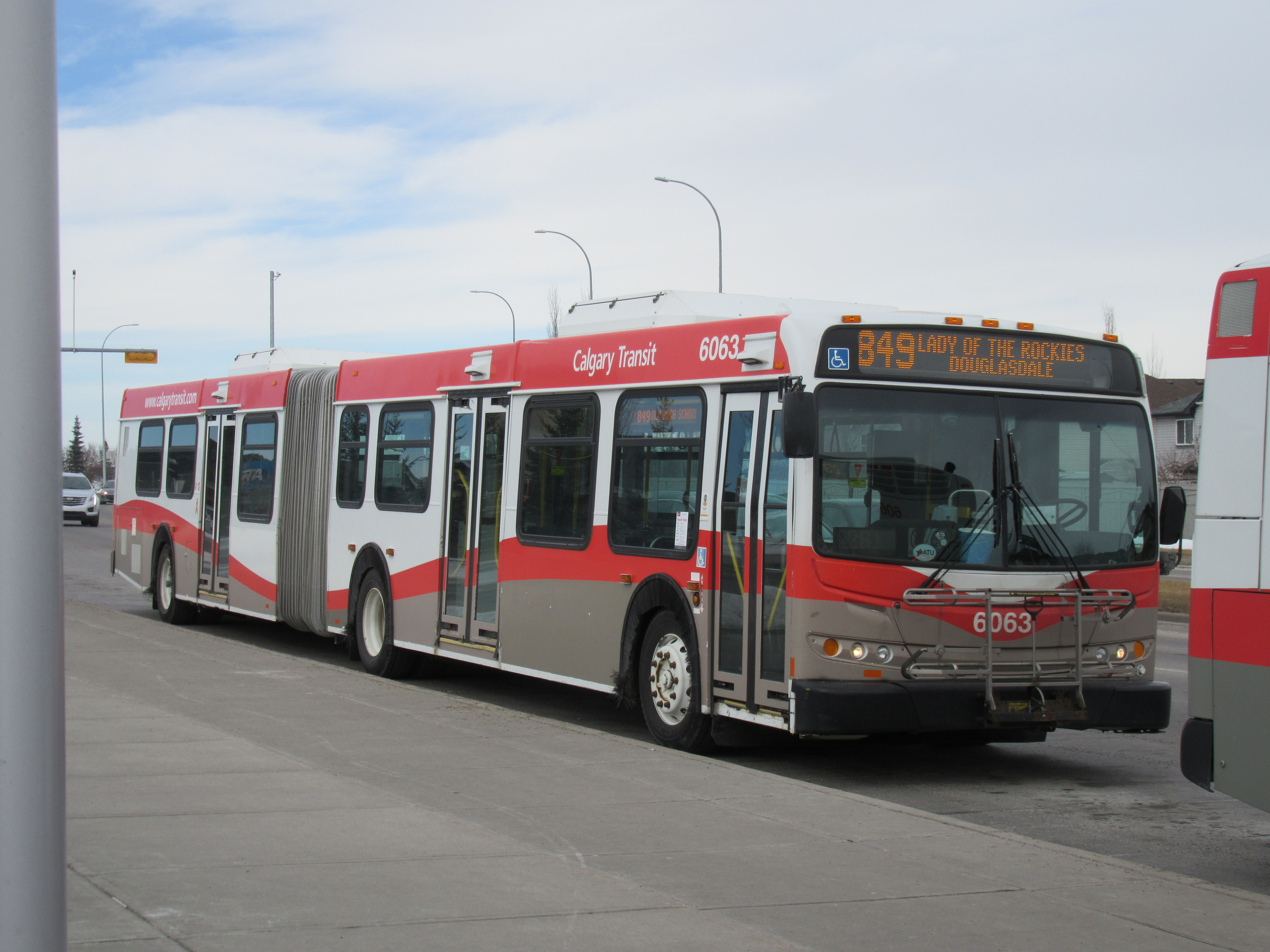
Bus at McKenzie Towne Terminal

A "park and ride" facility has been constructed adjacent to the High Street shopping area off 52nd Street S.E., and is a hub for the region's current BRT (Bus Rapid Transit) line connecting to downtown; in the future (time-frame yet to be determined), BRT service is to be replaced by a full LRT (Light Rapid Transit) line, with a station earmarked next to the park and ride.

== See also ==
- List of neighbourhoods in Calgary
