= Hotchkiss, Calgary =

Hotchkiss
- Neighbourhood
- Location of Hotchkiss in Alberta
- Coordinates: 50°54′50″N 113°54′00″W
- Country: Canada
- Province: Alberta
- City: Calgary
- Quadrant: SE
- Ward: 12

Government
  - Mayor: Jeromy Farkas
  - Administrative body: Calgary City Council
  - Councillor: Mike Jamieson (A Better Calgary)
- Elevation: 1,094 m (3,589 ft)
- Time zone: UTC-7 (Mountain)
- Area code: 403 587

Hotchkiss is a suburban residential neighbourhood in the southeast quadrant of Calgary, Alberta, Canada. It is bounded by Marquis of Lorne Trail SE (Highway 22X to the south, Stoney Trail to the west, and 146 Avenue SE to the north.

Hotchkiss is located within Calgary City Council's Ward 12. The name of the community was adopted by Calgary City Council on May 6, 2013. The neighbourhood is named for late Harley Hotchkiss, a businessman, community leader and former owner of the Calgary Flames.

Hotchkiss is being developed in partnership by Hopewell Residential Communities of Calgary and Qualico Communities Calgary.

== See also ==
- List of neighbourhoods in Calgary
