= Wentworth, Calgary =

Wentworth
- Neighbourhood
- Location of Wentworth in Calgary
- Coordinates: 51.0568°N 114.216°W
- Country: Canada
- Province: Alberta
- City: Calgary
- Quadrant: SW
- Ward: 6

Government
  - Mayor: Jeromy Farkas
  - Administrative body: Calgary City Council
  - Councillor: John Pantazopoulos (Independent)
- Elevation: 1,236 m (4,055 ft)

Population (2008)
  - Total: under 1,000
- Postal code: T3H
- Website: http://www.mywentworth.com/

Wentworth is a small estate style community in southwest Calgary, Alberta. The unique features of Wentworth are its architectural treatment, tree coverage and ample green space. The community was developed between 2002 and 2008 and is home to under 1000 people. The community is composed of five units: Wentworth, The Willows of Wentworth, Wentworth Estates, Wexford Estates (now being built) and Wentworth Glen (under development).

Wentworth is contained within the larger community area of West Springs.

Wentworth was developed by Dundee developments except for the area of Wexford, which is being developed by the 7S Group.

Springside is an area adjacent to Wentworth. Although not officially part of Wentworth, Springside contains many streets by the same name.

== History ==
The zoning for the area was established by the East Springbank Area Structure Plan.

== Components ==
- The main area of Wentworth features a variety of single family homes on standard sized lots as well as several multi family condominium and townhouse buildings.
- The Willows of Wentworth is a unique estate area of luxury homes where the natural aspen forest has been protected via a bare land condominium.
- Wentworth Estates is a newer area of estate homes on large lots. Wexford is an extension of this area.
- Wentworth Glen is the final phase of Wentworth. This area will likely feature mostly higher density housing.

== Geography ==
Plant hardiness zone: 2b

Elevation: 4,055 ft (1,236 m), approximately 600 ft (180 m). above the level of the Bow River in downtown Calgary.

== Education ==
Wentworth is served by several public and private schools, including:

- Calgary Catholic School District
- Calgary French and International School
- Webber Academy
- Calgary Waldorf School
- West Springs School

== Churches ==
- Calgary Free Methodist Church. http://www.westspringsfmc.ca
- St. Michaels' Catholic Church will be constructed on 85th St. http://www.wscr.ca/downloads/2007_smc/siteplan.pdf
- St. Martin's Anglican Church. http://www.stmartinscalgary.ca

== See also ==
- List of neighbourhoods in Calgary
