= Cedarbrae, Calgary =

Cedarbrae
- Neighbourhood
- Location of Cedarbrae in Calgary
- Coordinates: 50°57′26″N 114°07′46″W
- Country: Canada
- Province: Alberta
- City: Calgary
- Quadrant: SW
- Ward: 11
- Established: 1973
- Annexed: 1959

Government
  - Mayor: Jeromy Farkas
  - Administrative body: Calgary City Council
  - Councillor: Rob Ward (Communities First)

Area
  - Total: 2.0 km^{2} (0.77 sq mi)
- Elevation: 1,125 m (3,691 ft)

Population (2006)
  - Total: 6,441
  - Average Income: $62,063
- Website: Cedarbrae Community Association

Cedarbrae is a residential neighbourhood in the southwest quadrant of Calgary, Alberta. It is bounded by Southland Drive to the north, 24 Street W to the east, Anderson Road to the south and Tsuut'ina Trail to the west.

The lands were annexed by the city in 1956, and Cedarbrae was established in 1973. It is represented in the Calgary City Council by the Ward 11 councillor.

== Demographics ==
In the City of Calgary's 2012 municipal census, Cedarbrae had a population of 6,237 living in 2,609 dwellings, a -0.4% increase from its 2011 population of 6,264. With a land area of 2.1 km^{2} (0.81 sq mi), it had a population density of 2,970/km^{2} (7,690/sq mi) in 2012.

Residents in this community had a median household income of $62,063 in 2000, and there were 11.8% low income residents living in the neighbourhood. As of 2000, 21.4% of the residents were immigrants. A proportion of 10.5% of the buildings were condominiums or apartments, and 22.7% of the housing was used for renting.

== Education ==
The community is served by Cedarbrae Elementary public school and St. Cyril Elementary & Junior High (Catholic).

== See also ==
- List of neighbourhoods in Calgary
