= Mount Royal, Calgary =

Mount Royal
- Neighbourhood
- Location of Mount Royal in Calgary
- Coordinates: 51°01′57″N 114°05′01″W
- Country: Canada
- Province: Alberta
- City: Calgary
- Quadrant: SW
- Ward: 8
- Established: 1904

Government
  - Mayor: Jeromy Farkas
  - Administrative body: Calgary City Council
  - Councillor: Nathaniel Schmidt (Independent)

Area
  - Total: 2.5 km^{2} (0.97 sq mi)
- Elevation: 1,080 m (3,540 ft)

Population (2006)
  - Total: 3,139 (Lower); 2,610 (Upper)
  - Average Income: $35,570 (Lower) $127,135 (Upper)
- Postal code: T2T 3E3
- Website: Mount Royal Community Association

Mount Royal is an area of Calgary, Alberta and is home to the neighbourhoods of Upper Mount Royal (to the south) and Lower Mount Royal (the northern section, on flat terrain), which are separated by an escarpment that runs along Cameron and Royal Avenues in an east-west direction. Upper Mount Royal has an area redevelopment plan in place.

Upper Mount Royal (along with Elbow Park and Roxboro) is one of Calgary's wealthiest neighbourhoods and is home to some of the city's most expensive estates ranging in age from nearly 100 years old to new. Originally an enclave of the city's American born business elite, the neighbourhood was originally known as 'American hill'. As of 2001, American immigrants still made up 29.2% of the residents. This informal name eventually gave way to the more Canadian name of Mount Royal. These neighbourhoods are concentrated in the Elbow River valley. The area of both neighbourhoods is bounded on the north by 17th Avenue SW and on the west by 14th Street SW.

Despite its name, Mount Royal is not home to the city's Mount Royal University.

== Demographics ==
In the City of Calgary's 2012 municipal census, Lower Mount Royal had a population of 3,180 living in 2,266 dwellings, a 6.7% increase from its 2011 population of 2,981. With a land area of 0.3 km^{2} (0.12 sq mi), it had a population density of 10,600/km^{2} (27,000/sq mi) in 2012. Also in the municipal census, Upper Mount Royal had a population of 2,542 living in 1,071 dwellings, a 0.2% increase from its 2011 population of 2,536. With a land area of 1.3 km^{2} (0.50 sq mi), it had a population density of 1,960/km^{2} (5,060/sq mi) in 2012.

In Calgary's nonpartisan municipal politics, Courtney Walcott, councillor for Ward 8, represents Mount Royal on Calgary City Council. He has served since 2021. In provincial politics, Samir Kayande represents the neighbourhood in the Legislative Assembly of Alberta as the MLA for the Calgary-Elbow riding. He is a member of the New Democratic Party and has served since 2023. In federal politics, Greg McLean represents the neighbourhood in the House of Commons of Canada as the MP for Calgary Centre. He is a member of the Conservative Party and has served since 2019.

Residents of Upper Mount Royal had a median household income of $127,135 in 2000, while those in Lower Mount Royal made far less at an average of $35,570. 11.7% and 26.7% low-income residents live in Upper and Lower Mount Royal respectively. While the majority of buildings in Upper Mount Royal (87.2%) are single-family detached homes, in Lower Mount Royal condominiums and apartment buildings are prevailing at 88.7%, with 77.5% used for renting in 2001.

== Crime ==
Crime Data
Year	Crime Rate (/100 pop.)
2018	7.6
2019	7.8
2020	5.9
2021	4.6
2022	5.3
2023	3.2

== Education ==
The community is served by Earl Grey Elementary School, William Reid Elementary School, Mount Royal Junior High and Western Canada High School.

== Notable residents ==
- Charlene Prickett: "It Figures" exercise host and Calgary television personality from the late 1970s to the 1990s; member of the Mount Royal Community Association

== See also ==
- List of neighbourhoods in Calgary
