= Point Mckay, Calgary =

Point Mckay
- Neighbourhood
- Location of Point Mckay in Calgary
- Coordinates: 51°03′35″N 114°08′40″W
- Country: Canada
- Province: Alberta
- City: Calgary
- Quadrant: NW
- Ward: 7
- Established: 1911
- Annexed: 1963

Government
  - Mayor: Jeromy Farkas
  - Administrative body: Calgary City Council
  - Councillor: Myke Atkinson (Independent)

Area
  - Total: 0.3 km^{2} (0.12 sq mi)
- Elevation: 1,060 m (3,480 ft)

Population (2006)
  - Total: 1,344
  - Average Income: $63,731

Point Mckay is a residential neighbourhood in the northwest quadrant of Calgary, Alberta. It is bounded to the north by Bowness Road and to the south by the Bow River. Edworthy Park is located across the river, and is connected by a bridge to Point Mckay.

It was part of the town of Montgomery before it was annexed to the City of Calgary in 1963. It is represented in the Calgary City Council by the Ward 7 councillor. The Provincial electoral division is Calgary-Varsity

== Demographics ==
In the City of Calgary's 2012 municipal census, Point Mckay had a population of 1,318 living in 846 dwellings, a 0% increase from its 2011 population of 1,318. With a land area of 0.4 km^{2} (0.15 sq mi), it had a population density of 3,300/km^{2} (8,500/sq mi) in 2012.

Residents in this community had a median household income of $63,731 in 2000, and there were 9.5% low income residents living in the neighbourhood. As of 2000, 15.2% of the residents were immigrants. A proportion of 37.4% of the buildings were condominiums or apartments, and 25.8% of the housing was used for renting.

== Education ==
The community is served by University Elementary and Queen Elizabeth High School public school.

== See also ==
- List of neighbourhoods in Calgary
