= Bayview, Calgary =

Bayview
- Neighbourhood
- Location of Bayview in Calgary
- Coordinates: 50°58′31″N 114°06′52″W
- Country: Canada
- Province: Alberta
- City: Calgary
- Quadrant: SW
- Ward: 11
- Established: 1967

Government
  - Mayor: Jeromy Farkas
  - Administrative body: Calgary City Council
  - Councillor: Rob Ward (Communities First)

Area
  - Total: 0.5 km^{2} (0.19 sq mi)
- Elevation: 1,085 m (3,560 ft)

Population (2006)
  - Total: 659
  - Average Income: $184,383
- Website: Bayview Community Association

Bayview is a small residential neighbourhood in the southwest quadrant of Calgary, Alberta, Canada. It is located on a peninsula on the southern shore of Glenmore Reservoir. One of the lake's two marinas is located in this community.

Bayview was established in 1967. It is represented in the Calgary City Council by the Ward 11 councillor

== History ==
Bayview was developed by Alcan Design Homes, a subsidiary of Alcan. All homes were design by Alcan, and Shirley C. Ireland of Colleen Interiors assisted buyers with interior decoration. The first lot in Bayview, 1924 Bay Shore, was sold to Bill Dickie. Homes were ready for occupancy in January 1968. The predominant architectural style is American Colonial, although there are also Spanish, Tudor, and Modern homes. All houses have front garages and there are no laneways.

== Demographics ==
In the City of Calgary's 2012 municipal census, Bayview had a population of 682 living in 249 dwellings, a 5.2% increase from its 2011 population of 648. With a land area of 0.4 km^{2} (0.15 sq mi), it had a population density of 1,710/km^{2} (4,400/sq mi) in 2012.

It is one of Calgary's wealthiest communities, with residents having a median household income of $184,383 in 2000 (the highest in the city). As of 2000, 15.1% of the residents were immigrants. All buildings were single-family detached homes, and none of the housing was used for renting.

== Crime ==
Crime Data
Year	Crime Rate (/100 pop.)
2018	2.8
2019	3.4
2020	1.9
2021	1.6
2022	3.0
2023	1.8

== Education ==
The community is served by Nellie McClung Elementary and John Ware Junior High public schools as well as by St. Benedict Elementary (Catholic), none of which are actually located within Bayview itself.

== Commercial ==
The Glenmore Landing strip mall shopping centre is located off the southeast corner of the community and is its closest retail operation.

== See also ==
- List of neighbourhoods in Calgary
