= Beddington Heights, Calgary =

Established suburban neighbourhood in northwest Calgary, Alberta, Canada

Beddington Heights
- Neighbourhood
- Location of Beddington Heights in Calgary
- Coordinates: 51°07′39″N 114°04′37″W
- Country: Canada
- Province: Alberta
- City: Calgary
- Quadrant: NW
- Ward: 4
- Established: 1979

Government
  - Mayor: Jeromy Farkas
  - Administrative body: Calgary City Council
  - Councillor: DJ Kelly (The Calgary Party)

Area
  - Total: 8.4 km^{2} (3.2 sq mi)
- Elevation: 1,120 m (3,670 ft)

Population (2006)
  - Total: 11,926
  - Average Income: $56,881
- Website: Beddington Heights Community Association

Beddington Heights is an established suburban neighbourhood in northwest Calgary, Alberta, Canada. The community is bounded by Berkshire Boulevard to the north, Beddington Trail to the east, Beddington Boulevard to the south and 14th Street W to the west.

Beddington Heights is in Ward 4.

== Demographics ==
In the City of Calgary's 2012 municipal census, Beddington Heights had a population of 11,585 living in 4,348 dwellings, a 1.1% increase from its 2011 population of 11,457. With a land area of 3.2 km^{2} (1.2 sq mi), it had a population density of 3,620/km^{2} (9,380/sq mi) in 2012.

Residents in this community had a median household income of $56,881 in 2000, and there were 14.4% low income residents living in the neighbourhood. As of 2000, 27.5% of the residents were immigrants, and few of the buildings (1.9%) were condominiums or apartments, and 21.4% were used for renting.

== History ==
The community was originally named after the village of Beddington in Surrey, England. The area's original development began as a Canadian Pacific Railway station. The establishment of the neighbourhood of Beddington Heights occurred in 1979.

== Education ==
As of 2020, there are two schools in the neighborhood:

- Beddington Heights Elementary School - Calgary Board of Education
- St. Bede Elementary School - Calgary Catholic School District

== Shopping ==
Beddington Towne Centre is a concentrated commercial area along Centre Street. Centre Street hosts the Safeway Canada grocery store. Additionally, the Beddington Towne Centre and the adjacent area contain multiple bars, restaurants, small stores, banks and a London Drugs location.

Bedford Drive, located near Nose Creek Park, features a small strip mall that houses multiple take-out restaurants and a liquor store.

== See also ==
- List of neighbourhoods in Calgary
