= Collingwood, Calgary =

Collingwood
- Neighbourhood
- Location of Collingwood in Calgary
- Coordinates: 51°05′15″N 114°06′33″W
- Country: Canada
- Province: Alberta
- City: Calgary
- Quadrant: NW
- Ward: 4
- Established: 1959
- Annexed: 1910

Government
  - Mayor: Jeromy Farkas
  - Administrative body: Calgary City Council
  - Councillor: DJ Kelly (The Calgary Party)
- Elevation: 1,100 m (3,600 ft)

Population (2006)
  - Total: 2,325
  - Average Income: $55,208
- Website: Triwood Community Association

Collingwood is a residential neighbourhood in the northwest quadrant of Calgary, Alberta. It is located immediately south of the Nose Hill Park and John Laurie Boulevard, and west from 14th Street W. To the south it is bordered by Confederation Park, Canmore Park and the Confederation Park golf course.

The area was annexed to the City of Calgary in 1910, and Collingwood was established in 1959. It is represented in the Calgary City Council by the Ward 4 councillor.

== Demographics ==
In the City of Calgary's 2012 municipal census, Collingwood had a population of 2,222 living in 978 dwellings, a -0.4% increase from its 2011 population of 2,231. With a land area of 1.6 km^{2} (0.62 sq mi), it had a population density of 1,390/km^{2} (3,600/sq mi) in 2012.

Residents in this community had a median household income of $55,208 in 2000, and there were 13.5% low income residents living in the neighbourhood. As of 2000, 8.9% of the residents were immigrants. A proportion of 15% of the buildings were condominiums or apartments, and 25.9% of the housing was used for renting.

== See also ==
- List of neighbourhoods in Calgary
