= Mayfair, Calgary =

Mayfair
- Neighbourhood
- Location of Mayfair in Calgary
- Coordinates: 50°59′43″N 114°05′16″W
- Country: Canada
- Province: Alberta
- City: Calgary
- Quadrant: SW
- Ward: 11
- Established: 1957
- Annexed: 1965

Government
  - Mayor: Jeromy Farkas
  - Administrative body: Calgary City Council
  - Councillor: Rob Ward (Communities First)

Area
  - Total: 0.298 km^{2} (0.115 sq mi)
- Elevation: 1,080 m (3,540 ft)

Population (2006)
  - Total: 473
  - Average Income: $116,131
- Website: Mayfair Community Association

Mayfair is a small residential neighbourhood in the southwest quadrant of Calgary, Alberta. It is bounded to the north by the community of Bel-Aire, to the east by Elbow Drive, to the south by Glenmore Trail and to the west by the Glenmore Reservoir.

The land was annexed to the City of Calgary in 1956, and Mayfair was established one year later, in 1957. It is represented in the Calgary City Council by the Ward 11 councillor.

== Demographics ==
In the City of Calgary's 2012 municipal census, Mayfair had a population of 481 living in 156 dwellings, a 2.3% increase from its 2011 population of 470. With a land area of 0.3 km^{2} (0.12 sq mi), it had a population density of 1,600/km^{2} (4,200/sq mi) in 2012.

Residents in this community had a median household income of $116,131 in 2000, and there were 8.5% low income residents living in the neighbourhood. As of 2000, 15.2% of the residents were immigrants. All buildings were single-family detached homes, and none of the housing was used for renting.

== Education ==
The community is served by the Christopher Robin private school and the new C. Robin High (2006).

== See also ==
- List of neighbourhoods in Calgary
