= David McKenzie (Canadian politician) =

Canadian politician

David McKenzie MP

Member of Parliament for Calgary Signal Hill
- Incumbent
- Assumed office April 28, 2025
- Preceded by: Ron Liepert

Personal details
- Party: Conservative
- Website: https://davidmckenzie.ca

David GL McKenzie KC MP is a Canadian politician from the Conservative Party of Canada. He was elected Member of Parliament for Calgary Signal Hill in the 2025 Canadian federal election. McKenzie is a lawyer by profession.

At the time of the 2025 Canadian federal election, he lived in Calgary.

== Electoral record ==
2025 Canadian federal election: Calgary Signal Hill
| Party | Candidate | Votes | % | ±% | Expenditures |
|---|---|---|---|---|---|
| Conservative | David McKenzie | 41,638 | 60.15 | +0.34 | $81,218.89 |
| Liberal | Bryndis Whitson | 25,174 | 36.37 | +16.99 | $69,626.67 |
| New Democratic | Khalis Ahmed | 1,656 | 2.39 | –11.74 | $1,579.18 |
| People's | Grant Strem | 492 | 0.71 | –3.33 | none listed |
| Canadian Future | Paul Godard | 265 | 0.38 | – | $4,450.24 |
| Total valid votes/expense limit | | 69,225 | 99.45 | – | $138,190.99 |
| Total rejected ballots | | 382 | 0.55 | +0.00 | |
| Turnout | | 69,607 | 74.25 | +6.81 | |
| Eligible voters | | 93,742 | | | |
| Conservative hold | | Swing | | –8.33 | |
Source: Elections Canada
