= Rutland Park, Calgary =

Rutland Park
- Neighbourhood
- Location of Rutland Park in Calgary
- Coordinates: 51°01′15″N 114°08′10″W
- Country: Canada
- Province: Alberta
- City: Calgary
- Quadrant: SW
- Ward: 11
- Established: 1952
- Annexed: 1910

Government
  - Mayor: Jeromy Farkas
  - Administrative body: Calgary City Council
  - Councillor: Rob Ward (Communities First)

Area
  - Total: 0.9 km^{2} (0.35 sq mi)
- Elevation: 1,125 m (3,691 ft)

Population (2006)
  - Total: 2,264
  - Average Income: $46,545
- Website: Rutland Park Community Association

Rutland Park is an inner city residential neighbourhood in the southwest quadrant of Calgary, Alberta. It is bounded to the north by Richmond Road and 33 Avenue, to the east by Crowchild Trail, to the south by Glenmore Trail and to the west by 37 Street W.

The area was annexed to the City of Calgary in 1910 (under the name Sarcee Park ) and Rutland Park was established in 1952. It is represented in the Calgary City Council by the Ward 11 councillor.

== Demographics ==
In the City of Calgary's 2012 municipal census, Rutland Park had a population of 2,227 living in 972 dwellings, a -3.6% increase from its 2011 population of 2,309. With a land area of 0.7 km^{2} (0.27 sq mi), it had a population density of 3,180/km^{2} (8,200/sq mi) in 2012.

Residents in this community had a median household income of $46,545 in 2000, and there were 15.5% low income residents living in the neighbourhood. As of 2000, 13.2% of the residents were immigrants. A proportion of 8.9% of the buildings were condominiums or apartments, and 53% of the housing was used for renting.

== Education ==
The community is served by Sir James Lougheed Elementary public school.

== See also ==
- List of neighbourhoods in Calgary
