= Rosemont, Calgary =

Rosemont
- Neighbourhood
- Location of Rosemont in Calgary
- Coordinates: 51°04′41″N 114°05′28″W
- Country: Canada
- Province: Alberta
- City: Calgary
- Quadrant: NW
- Ward: 7
- Established: 1958
- Annexed: 1910

Government
  - Mayor: Jeromy Farkas
  - Administrative body: Calgary City Council
  - Councillor: Myke Atkinson (Independent)
- Elevation: 1,090 m (3,580 ft)

Population (2006)
  - Total: 1,247
  - Average Income: $53,027
- Website: Rosemont Community Association

Rosemont is a residential neighbourhood in the northwest quadrant of Calgary, Alberta. It is bounded by Northmount Drive to the north, by Cambrian Drive to the east, by 23 Avenue N and the Confederation Park to the south and by 14 Street W to the west.

The lands were annexed to the City of Calgary in 1910, and the neighbourhood was established in 1958. It is represented in the Calgary City Council by the Ward 7 councillor.

== Demographics ==
In the City of Calgary's 2012 municipal census, Rosemont had a population of 1,241 living in 563 dwellings, a 2.7% increase from its 2011 population of 1,208. With a land area of 0.5 km^{2} (0.19 sq mi), it had a population density of 2,480/km^{2} (6,400/sq mi) in 2012.

Residents in this community had a median household income of $53,027 in 2000, and there were 11.3% low income residents living in the neighbourhood. As of 2000, 13.4% of the residents were immigrants. A proportion of 18.6% of the buildings were condominiums or apartments, and 29.9% of the housing was used for renting.

== Education ==
The community is served by the Rosemont Elementary public school.

== See also ==
- List of neighbourhoods in Calgary
