= Palliser, Calgary =

Palliser
- Neighbourhood
- Location of Palliser in Calgary
- Coordinates: 50°57′53″N 114°06′37″W
- Country: Canada
- Province: Alberta
- City: Calgary
- Quadrant: SW
- Ward: 11
- Established: 1967

Government
  - Mayor: Jeromy Farkas
  - Administrative body: Calgary City Council
  - Councillor: Rob Ward (Communities First)

Area
  - Total: 1.0 km^{2} (0.39 sq mi)
- Elevation: 1,095 m (3,593 ft)

Population (2006)
  - Total: 3,319
  - Average Income: $57,603
- Website: Palliser Community Association

Palliser is a residential neighbourhood in the southwest quadrant of Calgary, Alberta. It is bounded to the north by 90 Ave SW, to the east by 19 Street SW, to the south by Southland Drive SW and to the west by 24 Street SW. The Tom Brook Athletic Park is located within the neighbourhood.

Named after John Palliser, an early explorer and geographer of western Canada, the neighbourhood was established in 1967. Until 1991, it included the community of Pump Hill. It is represented in the Calgary City Council by the Ward 11 councillor.

== Demographics ==
In the City of Calgary's 2012 municipal census, Palliser had a population of 3,293 living in 1,707 dwellings, a -0.2% increase from its 2011 population of 3,301. With a land area of 1 km^{2} (0.39 sq mi), it had a population density of 3,300/km^{2} (9,000/sq mi) in 2012.

Residents in this community had a median household income of $57,603 in 2000, and there were 7.3% low income residents living in the neighbourhood. As of 2000, 20.2% of the residents were immigrants. A proportion of 40.1% of the buildings were condominiums or apartments, and 36.8% of the housing was used for renting.

== Crime ==
Crime Data
Year	Crime Rate (/100 pop.)
2018	1.3
2019	1.2
2020	0.9
2021	0.4
2022	0.6
2023	0.6

== Education ==
The community is served by Nellie McClung Elementary School and John Ware Junior High School, as well as by St. Benedict Elementary School, a separate school.

== See also ==
- List of neighbourhoods in Calgary
