= West Springs, Calgary =

West Springs
- Neighbourhood
- Location of West Springs in Calgary
- Coordinates: 51°03′35″N 114°11′36″W
- Country: Canada
- Province: Alberta
- City: Calgary
- Quadrant: SW
- Ward: 6
- Established: 2001
- Annexed: 1995

Government
  - Mayor: Jeromy Farkas
  - Administrative body: Calgary City Council
  - Councillor: John Pantazopoulos (Independent)
- Elevation: 1,235 m (4,052 ft)

Population (2019)
  - Total: 10,758
  - Average Income: $158,306
- Postal code: T3H
- Website: West Springs Community Association

West Springs is a residential neighbourhood in the southwest quadrant of Calgary, Alberta, Canada. It is located at the western edge of the city, and is bordered to the west by the acreages and estate homes of Springbank. To the east it is bounded by 69 Street W, to the south by Bow Trail and to the north by Old Banff Coach Road, the community of Cougar Ridge and the Canada Olympic Park.

The land, previously part of the East Springbank area of the Municipal District of Rocky View, was annexed to the City of Calgary in 1995 and West Springs was established in 2001. It is represented in the Calgary City Council by Ward 6 the councillor. The western extension of the neighbourhood, west of 85th Street, reaching into the aspen parkland, is called Wentworth.

== Demographics ==
In the City of Calgary's 2012 municipal census, West Springs had a population of 8,228 living in 2,795 dwellings, a 4.8% increase from its 2011 population of 7,849. With a land area of 4.1 km^{2} (1.6 sq mi), it had a population density of 2,007/km^{2} (5,200/sq mi) in 2012.

Residents in this community had a median household income of $88,328 in 2000, and there were 9.8% low income residents living in the neighbourhood. As of 2000, 28.2% of the residents were immigrants. All buildings were single-family detached homes, and only 5.9% of the housing was used for renting.

== Education ==
The Calgary Board of Education opened the West Springs Elementary School in September 2010, serving Kindergarten to Grade 4 students residing in West Springs. In January 2017, West Ridge School opened for Grade 5 through Grade 9, serving the communities of West Springs and Cougar Ridge.

== See also ==
- List of neighbourhoods in Calgary
