= Scarboro, Calgary =

Scarboro
- Neighbourhood
- Location of Scarboro in Calgary
- Coordinates: 51°02′20″N 114°06′29″W
- Country: Canada
- Province: Alberta
- City: Calgary
- Quadrant: SW
- Ward: 8
- Established: 1910

Government
  - Mayor: Jeromy Farkas
  - Administrative body: Calgary City Council
  - Councillor: Nathaniel Schmidt (Independent)
- Elevation: 1,085 m (3,560 ft)

Population (2006)
  - Total: 1,328
  - Average Income: $79,948
- Postal code: T3C
- Website: Scarboro Community Association

Scarboro is a residential neighbourhood in the southwest quadrant of Calgary, Alberta. It is located in the inner city, between Bow Trail, 24th Street West and 14th St West. Its north-south boundaries are 12th Avenue South and 17th Avenue South. The community is bisected by the Crowchild Trail freeway.

The community consists of Scarboro proper, located on Scarboro Hill, consisting mostly of detached homes, and Upper Scarboro (officially called Scarboro/Sunalta West) which consists of the remaining small residential area west of Crowchild Trail.

== Demographics ==
In the City of Calgary's 2012 municipal census, Scarboro had a population of 880 living in 343 dwellings, a 1.1% increase from its 2011 population of 870. With a land area of 0.5 km^{2} (0.19 sq mi), it had a population density of 1,760/km^{2} (4,600/sq mi) in 2012. Also in the 2012 municipal census, Scarboro/Sunalta West had a population of 410 living in 165 dwellings, a 3.3% increase from its 2011 population of 397. With a land area of 0.4 km^{2} (0.15 sq mi), it had a population density of 1,030/km^{2} (2,700/sq mi) in 2012.

It is represented in the Calgary City Council by the Ward 8 councillor, on a provincial level by Calgary-Currie MLA Janet Eremenko, and at federal level by Calgary Centre MP Greg McLean.

Scarboro is a well established and relatively wealthy neighbourhood, with the median household income of $79,948 (2000), and 7.5% low-income residents. As of 2000, 20.6% of the residents were immigrants.

== Crime ==
Crime Data
Year	Crime Rate (/100 pop.)
2018	4.1
2019	4.8
2020	2.8
2021	2.1
2022	2.6
2023	2.2

== Education ==
The community is served by Sunalta Elementary public school and Sacred Heart Elementary (also publicly funded.)

== See also ==
- List of neighbourhoods in Calgary
