= Crestmont, Calgary =

Crestmont
- Neighbourhood
- Location of Crestmont in Calgary
- Coordinates: 51°05′10″N 114°15′49″W
- Country: Canada
- Province: Alberta
- City: Calgary
- Quadrant: SW
- Ward: 1

Government
  - Mayor: Jeromy Farkas
  - Administrative body: Calgary City Council
  - Councillor: Kim Tyers (Communities First)
- Elevation: 1,175 m (3,855 ft)

Population (2006)
  - Total: 927
- Website: Crestmont Community Association

Crestmont is a residential neighbourhood in the southwest quadrant of Calgary, Alberta. It is located at the western edge of the city, south of the Trans-Canada Highway.

It is represented in the Calgary City Council by the Ward 1 councillor.

== Demographics ==
In the City of Calgary's 2012 municipal census, Crestmont had a population of 1,454 living in 462 dwellings, a 1.7% increase from its 2011 population of 1,430. With a land area of 0.6 km^{2} (0.23 sq mi), it had a population density of 2,420/km^{2} (6,300/sq mi) in 2012.

== See also ==
- List of neighbourhoods in Calgary
