= 2025 Calgary municipal election =

- October 20, 2025

Mayor and 14 councillors to Calgary City Council
- Turnout: 39.04% (▼7.34 pp)
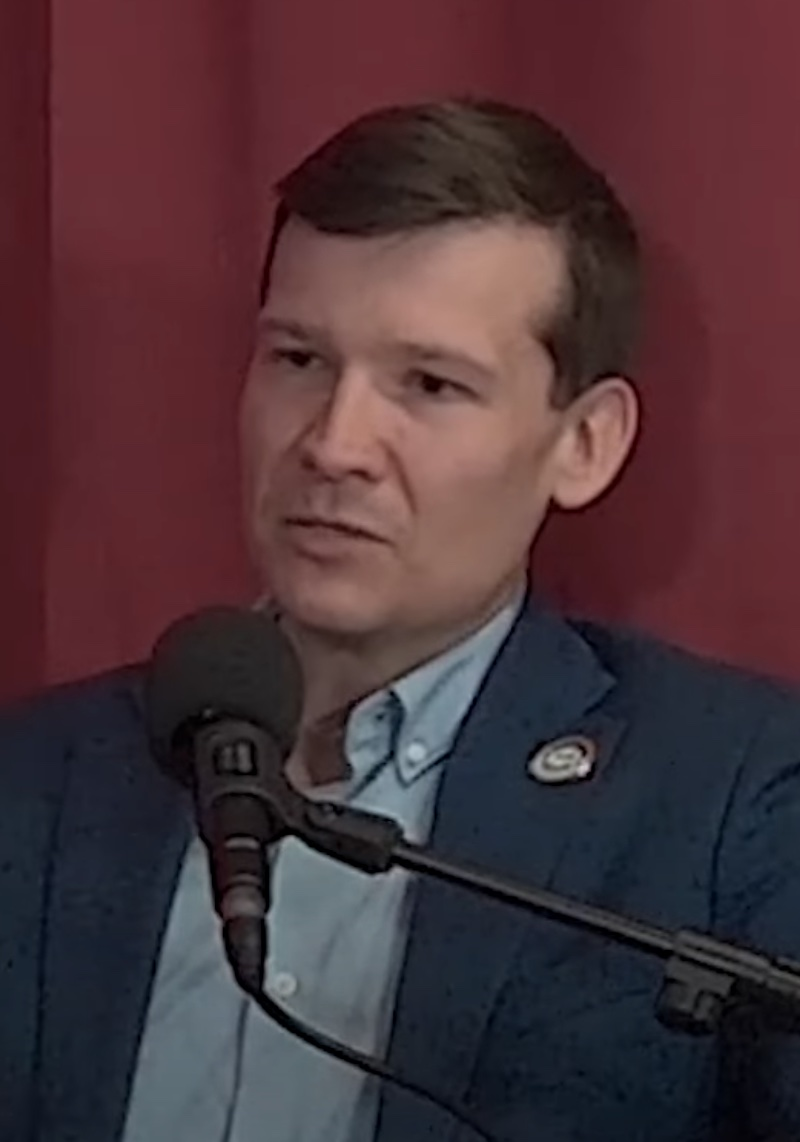

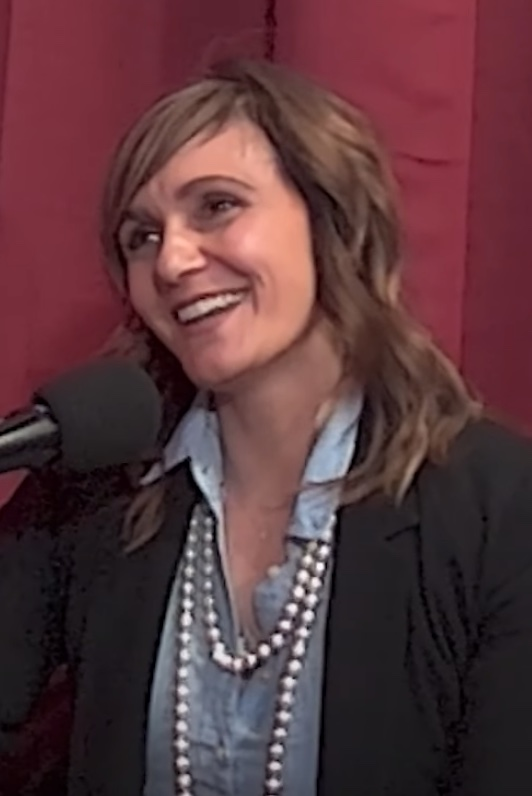

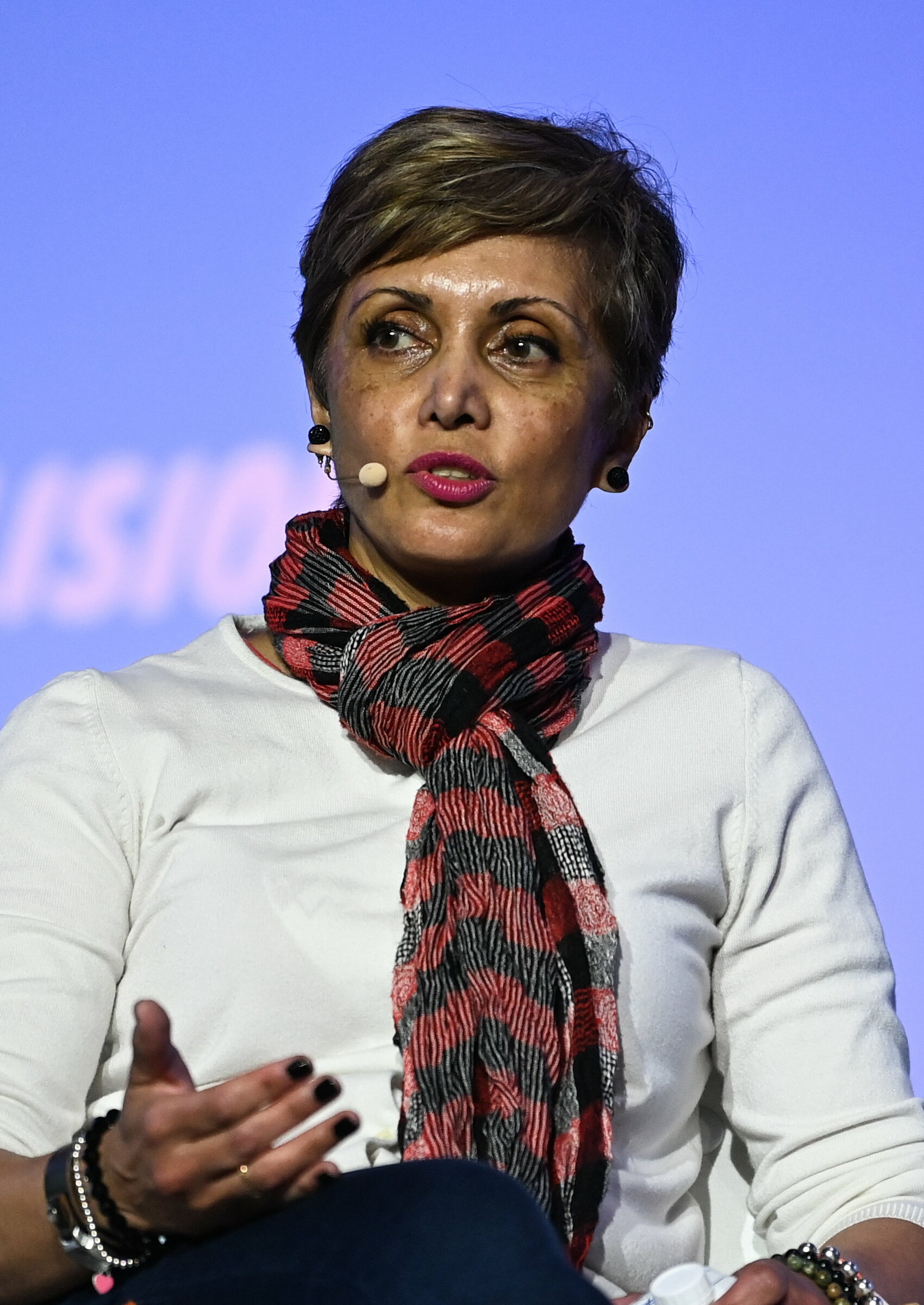

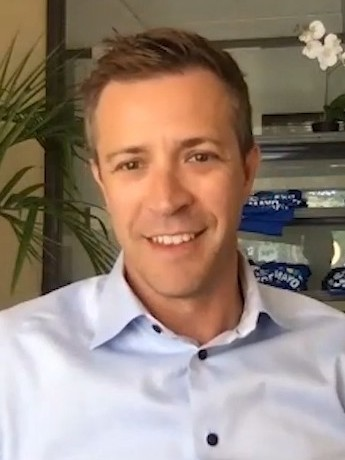

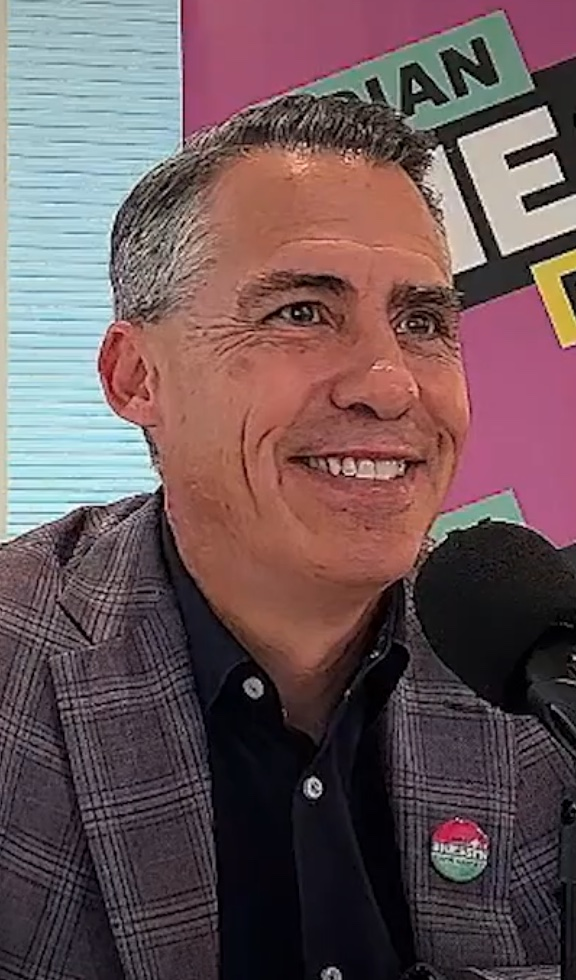
	Majority party	Minority party	Third party
Candidate	Jeromy Farkas	Sonya Sharp	Jyoti Gondek
Party	Independent	Communities First	Independent
Popular vote	91,071	90,488	71,402
Percentage	26.1%	26.0%	20.5%
	Fourth party	Fifth party
Candidate	Jeff Davison	Brian Thiessen
Party	Independent	The Calgary Party
Popular vote	47,375	40,521
Percentage	13.6%	11.6%
Mayor before election
Jyoti Gondek
Elected mayor
Jeromy Farkas
- City Council election
- 14 seats on Calgary City Council (Note: The mayor is a member of City Council, but for the purposes of documentation is treated as their own individual.); 8 seats needed for a majority
Party	Leader	Vote %	Seats	+/–
Independent	–	46.86%	8	−6
Communities First	Sonya Sharp	25.56%	4	+4
The Calgary Party	Brian Thiessen	18.99%	1	+1
A Better Calgary	Gordon Elliott	8.59%	1	+1
This lists parties that won seats. See the complete results below.
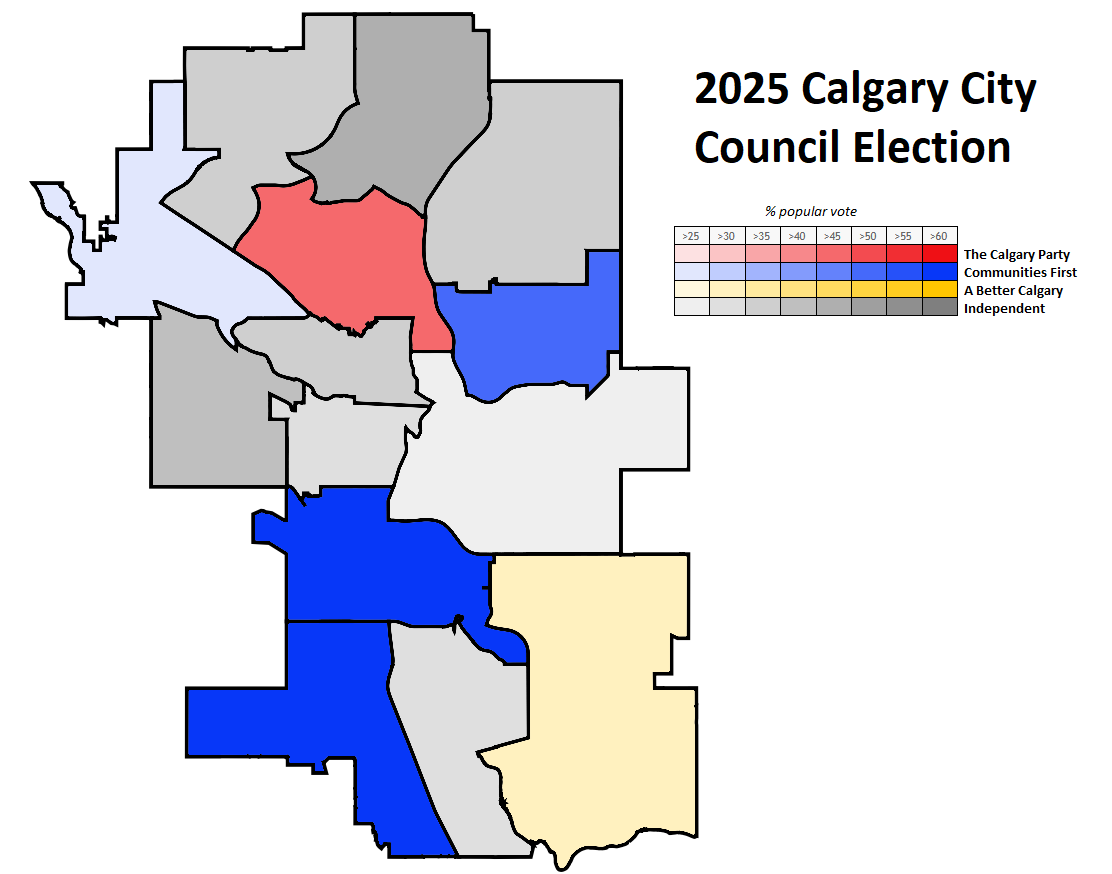
City Council winners by district

The 2025 Calgary municipal election was held on October 20, 2025, to elect a mayor and fourteen councillors to the Calgary City Council. In conjunction with the elections for city council, residents also cast ballots for trustees of the Calgary Board of Education and the Calgary Catholic School District.

Incumbent mayor Jyoti Gondek was defeated. She is the first incumbent mayor since Ross Alger in 1980 not to be elected to a second term.

In the Calgary city election, only three of the 15 elected members (mayor plus 14 city councillors) were elected with majority of votes cast in the ward (or city-wide in the mayor's case). The other 12 were elected with just a minority of votes cast, with winner's percentage as low as 27 percent for two councillors, and the mayor himself elected with just 26 percent of votes cast.

== Background ==
The 2025 Calgary election was the first election in many years featuring municipal political parties. Three parties - Communities First, The Calgary Party, and the A Better Calgary Party - ran candidates.

== Electoral system ==
The mayor and each city councillor is elected in a single-winner contest using first-past-the-post voting.

== Mayoral election ==
Party	Candidate	Votes	%
Independent	Jeromy Farkas	91,071	26.12
Communities First	Sonya Sharp	90,488	25.95
Independent	Jyoti Gondek	71,402	20.48
Independent	Jeff Davison	47,375	13.59
The Calgary Party	Brian Thiessen	40,521	11.62
Independent	Sarah Elder	3,511	1.01
Independent	Grant Prior	2,175	0.62
Independent	Larry R. Heather	1,202	0.34
Independent	Jaeger Gustafson	905	0.26

=== Candidates ===
- Jeff Davison, 2021 mayoral candidate and former councillor. (Independent candidate)
- Sarah Elder (Independent candidate)
- Jeromy Farkas, 2021 mayoral candidate and former councillor. (Independent candidate)
- Jyoti Gondek, Incumbent Mayor since 2021. (Independent candidate)
- Jaeger Gustafson (Independent candidate)
- Larry R. Heather, mayoral candidate in 2013, 2017, and 2021. (Independent candidate)
- Grant Prior (Independent candidate)
- Sonya Sharp, Ward 1 councillor since 2021. (Communities First candidate)
- Brian Thiessen, lawyer. (The Calgary Party candidate)

=== Opinion polling ===
Polling firm	Date	Jeff Davison	Jeromy Farkas	Jyoti Gondek	Sonya Sharp	Brian Thiessen	Other	Sample size	MOE	Polling method	Lead
Janet Brown Opinion Research/Trend Research	Oct 1-8, 2025	16%	27%	23%	23%	8%	Sarah Elder 1% Grant Prior 1% Larry R. Heather <1% Jaeger Gustafson <1%	1,000	±3.1pp	Online	4%
Cardinal Research	Oct 2-4, 2025	12%	25%	14%	16%	6%	Undecided 24% Others 3%	726	±3.6pp	IVR	9%
One Persuasion	Sept 26-30, 2025	8.8%	17.7%	16.8%	11.7%	6%	Undecided 26.1% Larry Heather 3.1% Jaeger Gustafson 1.7% Grant Prior 0.9%	804	±3.5%pp	Online	0.9%
ThinkHQ	Sept 22-29, 2025	9%	20%	16%	17%	6%	Undecided 27% Another candidate 1%	1,200	±2.8pp	Online	3%
Leger	Sept 26-28, 2025	8%	16%	14%	11%	4%	Undecided 35% Someone else 4% (Note: Includes 3% for Jeffery Clauson, who is not on the ballot.); Grant Prior 2% Jaeger Gustafson <1%	490	±4.4pp	Online	2%
Cardinal Research	Sept 17-20, 2025	14%	34%	15%	10%	3%	Undecided 21% Others 3%	910	±3.3pp	IVR	19%
Leger	Aug 22-25, 2025	6%	14%	15%	8%	3%	Undecided 45% Jeffery; Clauson 2% Someone else 2% Jaeger; Gustafson 1% Grant; Prior <1%	471	±4.5pp	Online	1%

== City council elections ==
=== Summary ===
Party	Party leader	Candidates	Seats won	Popular vote	%
Independent	—	44	8	158,220	46.86
Communities First	Sonya Sharp	9	4	86,316	25.56
The Calgary Party	Brian Thiessen	13	1	64,125	18.99
A Better Calgary	Gordon Elliott	7	1	29,018	8.59

=== Ward 1 ===
Party	Candidate	Vote	%
Communities First	Kim Tyers	7,806	27.45
The Calgary Party	Joey Nowak	7,332	25.79
Independent	Dan Olesen	5,230	18.39
A Better Calgary	Cathy Jacobs	4,400	15.47
Independent	Ali Oonwala	2,078	7.31
Independent	Matthew Fritz	1,588	5.58

=== Ward 2 ===
Party	Candidate	Vote	%
Independent	Jennifer Wyness (X)	8,872	39.25
A Better Calgary	John Garden	6,106	27.01
The Calgary Party	Candy Lam	4,876	21.57
Independent	Trevor Cavanaugh	2,130	9.42
Independent	Shaukat Chaudhry	620	2.74

=== Ward 3 ===
Party	Candidate	Vote	%
Independent	Andrew Yule	9,842	48.78
A Better Calgary	Christy Edwards	3,949	19.57
Independent	Danny Ng	1,575	7.81
Independent	Jaspriya Johal	1,375	6.82
Independent	Taran Dhillon	1,073	5.32
The Calgary Party	Atul Chauhan	936	4.64
Independent	Siraaj Shah	811	4.02
Independent	Rajesh Angral	615	3.05

=== Ward 4 ===
Party	Candidate	Vote	%
The Calgary Party	DJ Kelly	11,881	45.58
Communities First	Jeremy Wong	10,443	40.06
Independent	Sheldon Yakiwchuk	3,743	14.36

=== Ward 5 ===
Party	Candidate	Vote	%
Independent	Raj Dhaliwal (X)	6,242	39.52
Independent	Aryan Sadat	3,719	23.55
Independent	Reet Mushiana	2,872	18.18
Independent	Tariq Khan	1,307	8.28
The Calgary Party	Gurpreet Dhillon	1,218	7.71
Independent	Jigar Patel	225	1.42
Independent	Harry Singh Purba	211	1.34

=== Ward 6 ===
Party	Candidate	Vote	%
Independent	John Pantazopoulos	12,893	43.13
Independent	Joanne Birce	6,610	22.11
The Calgary Party	Inam Teja	6,069	20.30
Independent	Jeff Watson	4,318	14.45

=== Ward 7 ===
Party	Candidate	Vote	%
Independent	Myke Atkinson	8,527	37.24
Communities First	Terry Wong (X)	7,245	31.64
The Calgary Party	Heather McRae	2,884	12.60
Independent	David Barrett	2,541	11.10
A Better Calgary	Anthony Ascue	958	4.18
Independent	Greg Amoruso	740	3.23

=== Ward 8 ===
Party	Candidate	Vote	%
Independent	Nathaniel Schmidt	8,806	32.58
Communities First	Cornelia Wiebe	7,754	28.69
Independent	Gary Bobrovitz	4,871	18.02
Independent	Kent Hehr	3,539	13.09
Independent	Josie Kirkpatrick	1,519	5.62
Independent	Miguel Cortines	539	1.99

=== Ward 9 ===
Party	Candidate	Vote	%
Independent	Harrison M. Clark	4,845	27.24
Independent	Gar Gar	4,578	25.74
A Better Calgary	Tony Dinh	3,090	17.37
The Calgary Party	Ariana Kippers	1,826	10.26
Communities First	Alison Karim-McSwiney	1,578	8.87
Independent	Marina Ortman	1,568	8.81
Independent	Shirley Brun Parungao Do	304	1.71

=== Ward 10 ===
Party	Candidate	Vote	%
Communities First	Andre Chabot (X)	8,815	54.78
The Calgary Party	Nickie Brockhoff	3,048	18.94
Independent	Mahmoud Mourra	2,657	16.51
Independent	Tarlochan Singh Sidhu	1.573	9.77

=== Ward 11 ===
Party	Candidate	Vote	%
Communities First	Rob Ward	21,022	62.01
Independent	Kourtney Penner (X)	8,392	24.75
The Calgary Party	Alex Williams	4,489	13.24

=== Ward 12 ===
Party	Candidate	Vote	%
A Better Calgary	Mike Jamieson	6,848	30.03
The Calgary Party	Sarah Ferguson	6,819	29.90
Communities First	Shane Byciuk	5,314	23.30
Independent	Brent Curtis	2,969	13.02
Independent	Raj-Kumar Khuttan	854	3.74

=== Ward 13 ===
Party	Candidate	Vote	%
Communities First	Dan McLean (X)	16,339	64.94
The Calgary Party	Elliot Weinstein	8,823	35.06

=== Ward 14 ===
Party	Candidate	Vote	%
Independent	Landon Johnston	9,184	31.63
Independent	Devin Elkin	5,417	18.65
Independent	Erin Averbukh	4,192	14.44
The Calgary Party	Ryan Stutt	3,924	13.51
A Better Calgary	Keener Hachey	3,667	12.63
Independent	Chima Akuchie	1,990	6.85
Independent	Sunjiv Raval	666	2.29

== Calgary Board of Education trustee elections ==
- In Wards 1 and 2, Jenny Regal won with 7,491 votes.
- In Wards 3 and 4, Laura Hack won with 20,214 votes.
- In Wards 5 and 10, Cynthia Cordova won with 4,747 votes.
- In Wards 6 and 7, Patricia Bolger won with 11,280 votes.
- In Wards 8 and 9, Susan Vukadinovic won with 12,601 votes.
- In Wards 11 and 13, Nancy Close won with 20,734 votes.
- In Wards 12 and 14, Charlene May won with 9,615 votes.
