= Pump Hill, Calgary =

Pump Hill
- Neighbourhood
- Location of Pump Hill in Calgary
- Coordinates: 50°57′56″N 114°06′10″W
- Country: Canada
- Province: Alberta
- City: Calgary
- Quadrant: SW
- Ward: 11
- Established: 1967

Government
  - Mayor: Jeromy Farkas
  - Administrative body: Calgary City Council
  - Councillor: Rob Ward (Communities First)
- Elevation: 1,095 m (3,593 ft)

Population (2006)
  - Total: 1,849
  - Average Income: $93,360

Pump Hill is a residential neighbourhood in the southwest quadrant of Calgary, Alberta. It is bounded to the north by 90th Avenue SW and the Glenmore Reservoir, to the east by 14 Street SW, to the south by Southland Drive and to the west by 19 Street SW.

Pumphill was developed starting with 1967, when it was still incorporated in Palliser. It became a neighbourhood in its own right in 1991. It is represented in the Calgary City Council by the Ward 11 councillor.

== Demographics ==
In the City of Calgary's 2012 municipal census, Pump Hill had a population of 1,614 living in 563 dwellings, a -2.5% increase from its 2011 population of 1,655. With a land area of 0.9 km^{2} (0.35 sq mi), it had a population density of 1,790/km^{2} (4,640/sq mi) in 2012.

Residents in this community had a median household income of $93,360 in 2000, and there were 6.2% low income residents living in the neighbourhood. As of 2000, 16.5% of the residents were immigrants. A proportion of 21.7% of the buildings were condominiums or apartments, and 28.4% of the housing was used for renting.

== Education ==
The community is served by Nellie McClung Elementary and John Ware Junior High public schools as well as by the St. Benedict Elementary (Catholic).

== See also ==
- List of neighbourhoods in Calgary
