= Rosedale, Calgary =

Rosedale
- Neighbourhood
- Location of Rosedale in Calgary
- Coordinates: 51°03′50″N 114°04′33″W
- Country: Canada
- Province: Alberta
- City: Calgary
- Quadrant: NW
- Ward: 7
- Established: 1929
- Annexed: 1907

Government
  - Mayor: Jeromy Farkas
  - Administrative body: Calgary City Council
  - Councillor: Myke Atkinson (Independent)

Area
  - Total: 0.631 km^{2} (0.244 sq mi)
- Elevation: 1,082 m (3,550 ft)

Population (2021)
  - Total: 1,495
  - Average Income: $184,000
- Website: Rosedale Community Association

Rosedale is a residential neighbourhood in the northwest quadrant of Calgary, Alberta. It is located south of the Trans-Canada Highway, between 4th and 10th Street NW. To the south it is bounded by McHugh Bluff Park and the community of Sunnyside.

It is represented in the Calgary City Council by the Ward 7 councillor.

== Demographics ==
In the City of Calgary's 2021 municipal census, Rosedale had a population of 1,495 living in 590 dwellings, compared to its 2011 population of 1,569. With a land area of 0.7 km^{2} (0.27 sq mi), it had a population density of 2,240/km^{2} (5,800/sq mi) in 2012.

Residents in this community had a median household income of $184,000 in 2021 compared to $78,067 in 2000, and 6% of residents had a low income. As of 2021, 16% of the residents were immigrants. 4% of the buildings were condominiums or apartments, and 12% of housing was for rent as opposed to 23.2% in 2006.

== Crime ==
Crime Data
Year	Crime Rate (/100 pop.)
2018	2.7
2019	2.5
2020	3.8
2021	3.2
2022	3.4
2023	1.7

== Education ==
The Rosedale Elementary & Junior High public school is located in this community.

== See also ==
- List of neighbourhoods in Calgary
