= Shaganappi, Calgary =

Shaganappi
- Neighbourhood
- Location of Shaganappi in Calgary
- Coordinates: 51°02′23″N 114°07′41″W
- Country: Canada
- Province: Alberta
- City: Calgary
- Quadrant: SW
- Ward: 8
- Established: 1949
- Annexed: 1910

Government
  - Mayor: Jeromy Farkas
  - Administrative body: Calgary City Council
  - Councillor: Nathaniel Schmidt (Independent)

Area
  - Total: 0.9 km^{2} (0.35 sq mi)
- Elevation: 1,120 m (3,670 ft)

Population (2006)
  - Total: 1,657
  - Average Income: $36,368
- Postal code: T3C
- Website: Shaganappi Community Association

Shaganappi is a residential neighbourhood in the southwest quadrant of Calgary, Alberta. It is located between 17 Avenue SW and the Bow River. The Shaganappi golf course is located north of the Bow Trail.

The name Shaganappi is of Cree origin, and was used as far back as 1870. The land was annexed to the City of Calgary in 1910 and Shaganappi was established as a neighbourhood in 1949. It is represented in the Calgary City Council by the Ward 8 councillor.

== Demographics ==
In the City of Calgary's 2012 municipal census, Shaganappi had a population of 1,553 living in 862 dwellings, a 6.4% increase from its 2011 population of 1,459. With a land area of 1.5 km^{2} (0.58 sq mi), it had a population density of 1,040/km^{2} (2,680/sq mi) in 2012.

Residents in this community had a median household income of $36,368 in 2000, and there were 19.5% low income residents living in the neighbourhood. As of 2000, 10.6% of the residents were immigrants. A proportion of 27.3% of the buildings were condominiums or apartments, and 52.8% of the housing was used for renting.

== Crime ==
Crime Data
Year	Crime Rate (/100 pop.)
2018	5.5
2019	3.9
2020	4.7
2021	3.4
2022	3.3
2023	4.2

== Education ==
The community is served by Alex Ferguson Elementary public school.

== See also ==
- List of neighbourhoods in Calgary
