= Skyview Ranch, Calgary =

Skyview Ranch
- Neighbourhood
- Location of Skyview Ranch in Calgary
- Coordinates: 51°09′35″N 113°57′34″W
- Country: Canada
- Province: Alberta
- City: Calgary
- Quadrant: NE

Government
  - Mayor: Jeromy Farkas
  - Administrative body: Calgary City Council
  - Councillor: George Chahal

Population (2012)
  - Total: 2,990
- Time zone: UTC-7 (Mountain)
- Area code: 403 587

Skyview Ranch is a residential neighbourhood in the northeast quadrant of Calgary, Alberta, Canada. Located near the north edge of the city, it is bounded by Métis Trail N.E. to the west, the Redstone community to the north, 60 Street N.E. to the east, and the Cityscape community to the south. It is bisected by Country Hills Boulevard, which becomes Highway 564 to the east.

Skyview Ranch is located within Calgary City Council's Ward 5.

== Demographics ==
In the City of Calgary's 2012 municipal census, Skyview Ranch had a population of 2,990 living in 1,306 dwellings, a 65.7% increase from its 2011 population of 1,805. With a land area of 4.6 km^{2} (1.8 sq mi), it had a population density of 650/km^{2} (1,683/sq mi) in 2012.

== See also ==
- List of neighbourhoods in Calgary
