= Coventry Hills, Calgary =

Coventry Hills
- Neighbourhood
- Location of Coventry Hills in Calgary
- Coordinates: 51°09′38″N 114°03′00″W
- Country: Canada
- Province: Alberta
- City: Calgary
- Quadrant: NE
- Ward: 3
- Established: 1991

Government
  - Mayor: Jeromy Farkas
  - Administrative body: Calgary City Council
  - Councillor: Andrew Yule (Independent)
- Elevation: 1,080 m (3,540 ft)

Population (2006)
  - Total: 12,601
  - Average Income: $70,096
- Website: Northern Hills Community Association

Coventry Hills is a suburban residential neighbourhood in the northeast quadrant of Calgary, Alberta. It is at the northern edge of the city and is bounded by Stoney Trail to the north, Deerfoot Trail and the Nose Creek to the east, Country Hills Boulevard to the south, and Harvest Hills Boulevard to the west.

Coventry Hills was established as a neighbourhood in 1991. It is represented in the Calgary City Council by the Ward 3 councillor.

== Demographics ==
In the City of Calgary's 2012 municipal census, Coventry Hills had a population of 15,969 living in 5,322 dwellings, a 1.6% increase from its 2011 population of 15,722. With a land area of 4.1 km^{2} (1.6 sq mi), it had a population density of 3,890/km^{2} (10,090/sq mi) in 2012.

Residents in this community had a median household income of $70,096 in 2000, and there were 6% low income residents living in the neighbourhood. As of 2000, 12.9% of the residents were immigrants. All buildings were single-family detached homes, and 3.9% of the housing was used for renting.

== Education ==
Coventry Hills has four public schools: Coventry Hills School (K-5), Northern Lights School (K-5), Nose Creek School (6-9), and North Trail High School (10-12). St. Clare Catholic Elementary School (K-6) is also within the community.

== See also ==
- List of neighbourhoods in Calgary
