= Britannia, Calgary =

Britannia
- Neighbourhood
- Location of Britannia in Calgary
- Coordinates: 51°00′47″N 114°04′57″W
- Country: Canada
- Province: Alberta
- City: Calgary
- Quadrant: SW
- Ward: 11
- Established: 1956
- Annexed: 1910

Government
  - Mayor: Jeromy Farkas
  - Administrative body: Calgary City Council
  - Councillor: Rob Ward (Communities First)

Area
  - Total: 0.6 km^{2} (0.23 sq mi)
- Elevation: 1,075 m (3,527 ft)

Population (2006)
  - Total: 784
  - Average Income: $120,387
- Website: Britannia Community Association

Britannia is an affluent residential neighbourhood in the southwest quadrant of Calgary, Alberta, Canada. It is bounded by Elbow Drive to the east, 50 Avenue S to the south, Elbow River and Riverdale Park to the west and Britannia Drive to the north.

The area was annexed to the City of Calgary in 1910, and Britannia was established in 1956. Most of the development took place in the late 1950s. It is represented in the Calgary City Council by the Ward 11 councillors.

== Demographics ==
In the City of Calgary's 2012 municipal census, Britannia had a population of 803 living in 309 dwellings, a 7.6% increase from its 2011 population of 746. With a land area of 0.5 km^{2} (0.19 sq mi), it had a population density of 1,610/km^{2} (4,200/sq mi) in 2012.

Residents in this community had a median household income of $120,387 in 2000, and there were 7.9% low income residents living in the neighbourhood. As of 2000, 16.7% of the residents were immigrants. A proportion of 19.3% of the buildings were condominiums or apartments, and 19.3% of the housing was used for renting.

== See also ==
- List of neighbourhoods in Calgary
