= Discovery Ridge, Calgary =

Discovery Ridge
- Neighbourhood
- Location of Discovery Ridge in Calgary
- Coordinates: 51°00′59″N 114°12′41″W
- Country: Canada
- Province: Alberta
- City: Calgary
- Quadrant: SW
- Ward: 6
- Established: 1990

Government
  - Mayor: Jeromy Farkas
  - Administrative body: Calgary City Council
  - Councillor: John Pantazopoulos (Independent)
- Elevation: 1,110 m (3,640 ft)

Population (2006)
  - Total: 3,105
  - Average Income: $128,844
- Postal code: T3H
- Website: Discovery Ridge Community Association

Discovery Ridge is a residential neighbourhood in the southwest quadrant of Calgary, Alberta. It is located at the western edge of the city and is bounded by Stoney Trail to the north, 69 Street W to the east, Rocky View County and the city limits to the west and the Elbow River and Tsuu T'ina first nation reserve to the south.

Long before development, this area was referred to by longtime Calgarians as "Jackson's Valley", an isolated valley beside the Sarcee Military Reserve. When development first began in the late 1990s, the community was known as New Discovery and it was originally planned as a gated community, but this idea was later dropped and today, Discovery Ridge can be accessed by the public.

Discovery Ridge was a project initialized by a developer in the early 1990.

It is represented in the Calgary City Council by the Ward 6 councillor.

== Demographics ==
In the City of Calgary's 2012 municipal census, Discovery Ridge had a population of 4,350 living in 1,649 dwellings, a 0.7% increase from its 2011 population of 4,321. With a land area of 3.6 km^{2} (1.4 sq mi), it had a population density of 1,208/km^{2} (3,130/sq mi) in 2012.

Residents in this community had a median household income of $128,844 in 2000, and there were no low income residents living in the neighbourhood. As of 2000, 32.3% of the residents were immigrants. Most buildings were single-family detached homes and estate homes and none of the housing was used for renting.

== See also ==
- List of neighbourhoods in Calgary
