= Coach Hill, Calgary =

Coach Hill
- Neighbourhood
- Location of Coach Hill in Calgary
- Coordinates: 51°03′21″N 114°10′45″W
- Country: Canada
- Province: Alberta
- City: Calgary
- Quadrant: SW
- Ward: 6
- Established: 1979
- Annexed: 1956

Government
  - Mayor: Jeromy Farkas
  - Administrative body: Calgary City Council
  - Councillor: John Pantazopoulos (Independent)

Area
  - Total: 1.1 km^{2} (0.42 sq mi)
- Elevation: 1,215 m (3,986 ft)

Population (2006)
  - Total: 3,308
  - Average Income: $75,337
- Postal code: T3H
- Website: Coach Hill Community Association

Coach Hill is a residential neighbourhood in the southwest quadrant of Calgary, Alberta, Canada. It is bounded by Sarcee Trail to the east, Bow Trail to the south, 69 Street to the west and Old Banff Coach Road to the north.

The lands were annexed to the city of Calgary in 1956 and Coach Hill was established in 1979. It is represented in the Calgary City Council by the Ward 6 councillor.

This neighbourhood is served by the 69th Street CTrain station.

== Demographics ==
In the City of Calgary's 2012 municipal census, Coach Hill had a population of 3,279 living in 1,480 dwellings, a 2.7% increase from its 2011 population of 3,194. With a land area of 1.1 km^{2} (0.42 sq mi), it had a population density of 2,980/km^{2} (7,700/sq mi) in 2012.

Residents in this community had a median household income of $75,337 in 2000, and there were 5% low income residents living in the neighbourhood. As of 2000, 20.6% of the residents were immigrants. A proportion of 16.4% of the buildings were condominiums or apartments, and 15.7% of the housing was used for renting.

== See also ==
- List of neighbourhoods in Calgary
