= Redstone, Calgary =

Redstone
- Neighbourhood
- Location of Redstone in Calgary
- Coordinates: 51°10′16″N 113°57′42″W
- Country: Canada
- Province: Alberta
- City: Calgary
- Quadrant: NE
- Ward-: 5

Government
  - Mayor: Jeromy Farkas
  - Administrative body: Calgary City Council
  - Councillor: George Chahal

Population (2012)
  - Total: 0
- Time zone: UTC-7 (Mountain)
- Area code: 403 587

Redstone is a residential neighbourhood in the northeast quadrant of Calgary, Alberta, Canada. Located near the north edge of the city, it is bounded by Métis Trail N.E. to the west, Stoney Trail to the north, 60 Street N.E. to the east, and 128 Ave N.E., the Skyview Ranch community to the south.

Redstone is located within Calgary City Council's Ward 5.

== Demographics ==
Redstone was not yet populated as of the City of Calgary's 2012 municipal census.

== See also ==
- List of neighbourhoods in Calgary
