= Bel-Aire, Calgary =

Bel-Aire
- Neighbourhood
- Location of Bel-Aire in Calgary
- Coordinates: 50°59′58″N 114°05′17″W
- Country: Canada
- Province: Alberta
- City: Calgary
- Quadrant: SW
- Ward: 11
- Established: 1960
- Annexed: 1954

Government
  - Mayor: Jeromy Farkas
  - Administrative body: Calgary City Council
  - Councillor: Rob Ward (Communities First)

Area
  - Total: 0.363 km^{2} (0.140 sq mi)
- Elevation: 1,090 m (3,580 ft)

Population (2006)
  - Total: 494
  - Average Income: $138,124
- Website: Bel-Aire Community Association

Bel-Aire is a residential neighbourhood in the southwest quadrant of Calgary, Alberta. It is located east of the Glenmore Reservoir and the Elbow River and west of the community of Meadowlark Park and Chinook Center and north of the neighbourhood of Mayfair. The Calgary Country Club golf course makes up its northern boundary.

Bel-Aire was annexed to the City of Calgary in 1954 and was established as a neighbourhood in 1960. It is represented in the Calgary City Council by the Ward 11 councillor.

== Demographics ==
In the City of Calgary's 2012 municipal census, Bel-Aire had a population of 424 living in 159 dwellings, a -5.6% increase from its 2011 population of 449. With a land area of 0.3 km^{2} (0.12 sq mi), it had a population density of 1,410/km^{2} (3,700/sq mi) in 2012.

Residents in this community had a median household income of $138,124 in 2000, and there were no low income residents living in the neighbourhood. As of 2000, 13.5% of the residents were immigrants. All buildings were single-family detached homes, and none of the housing was used for renting.

== Education ==
The community is served by the Calgary Girl's Charter School. The Bel-Aire campus serves students in grades 4 and 5.

== See also ==
- List of neighbourhoods in Calgary
