= A Better Calgary Party =

Municipal political party in Canada

- Abbreviation: ABC
- Leader: Gordon Elliott
- Founded: October 19, 2024
- Membership (2025): 2,000+
- Ideology: Conservatism (Canadian); Green conservatism
- Political position: Center right
- Colours: Blue; Yellow
- Seats on council: 1 / 15

Website
- abettercalgaryparty.ca

The A Better Calgary Party (ABC) is a conservative municipal political party in Calgary, Alberta, founded ahead of the poll city's 2025 municipal election. The party's only elected councillor is Mike Jamieson.

== History ==
The A Better Calgary Party was launched on June 19, 2024, and officially founded on October 19, later registering with Elections Calgary on March 26, 2025. This followed the introduction of provincial legislation permitting municipal political parties in Calgary and Edmonton. The party's founding was motivated by dissatisfaction with Mayor Jyoti Gondek and City Council, with founding members having been involved in a 2024 effort attempt to recall Gondek. The party intends to run a mayoral candidate and councillor candidates in most wards. However, it is not contesting certain wards and is instead endorsing other conservative candidates, including some affiliated with the Communities First party.

== Positions ==
The A Better Calgary Party describes itself as a "big tent, membership-driven organization" consisting of "common sense conservatives". Though it does not have a specific policy platform and does not intend to whip its councillors.

== Candidates in the 2025 municipal election ==
Seat	Candidate
Mayor	
Ward 1	Cathy Jacobs
Ward 2	John Garden
Ward 3	Christie Edwards
Ward 4	
Ward 5	
Ward 6	
Ward 7	Anthony Ascue
Ward 8	
Ward 9	Tony Dinh
Ward 10	
Ward 11	
Ward 12	Mike Jamieson
Ward 13	
Ward 14	Keener Hachey

== Electoral performance ==
=== City council ===
Election	City council seats	+/–	Position	Result
2025	1 / 14	▲1	4th	Opposition
