= Wildwood, Calgary =

Wildwood
- Neighbourhood
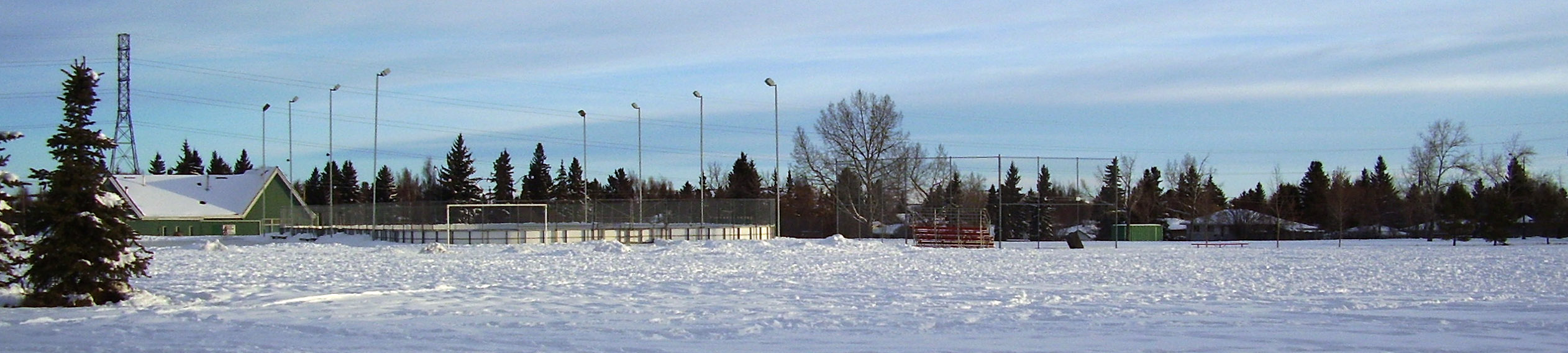
- The school yard and community centre in Wildwood

- Location of Wildwood in Calgary
- Coordinates: 51°03′07″N 114°09′03″W
- Country: Canada
- Province: Alberta
- City: Calgary
- Quarant: SW
- Ward: 6
- Established: 1956

Government
  - Mayor: Jeromy Farkas
  - Administrative body: Calgary City Council
  - Councillor: Nathaniel Schmidt (Independent)

Area
  - Total: 1.9 km^{2} (0.73 sq mi)
- Elevation: 1,140 m (3,740 ft)

Population (2019)
  - Total: 2,709
  - Average Income: $74,415
- Postal code: T3C
- Website: Wildwood Community Association

Wildwood is an established neighbourhood in the Southwest quadrant of Calgary, Alberta. It was first settled in 1883 and developed in the 1950s on a plateau to the south to the Bow River valley, and is primarily composed of single-detached bungalows on wide lots with rear laneways.

Wildwood is bounded on the north by Edworthy Park, a significant natural area park in Calgary, and the Bow River. It borders the neighbourhood of Spruce Cliff on the east side at 38th Avenue SW, and is limited on the south side by Bow Trail, a six-lane expressway.

It is represented in the Calgary City Council by the Ward 6 councillor.

Between 2006 and 2009, Bow Trail was widened to accommodate more suburban traffic.

== Demographics ==
As of 2019 Calgary Civic Census, Wildwood had a population had a population of 2,709 living in 1,111 dwellings, a 4.3% increase from its 2012 population of 2,598.

As of 2016 Census of Canada, residents in this community had a median household income of $137,371 (before taxes) in 2016, and there were 4% low income residents living in the neighbourhood. 14% of the residents were immigrants. 94% of the buildings were single-detached houses, 5% semi-detached or duplex and 1% condominiums or apartments. 9% of the housing was used for renting.

== Education ==
The community is served by Wildwood Elementary public school.

== See also ==
- List of neighbourhoods in Calgary
