= Roxboro, Calgary =

Roxboro
- Neighbourhood
- Location of Roxboro in Calgary
- Coordinates: 51°01′35″N 114°04′16″W
- Country: Canada
- Province: Alberta
- City: Calgary
- Quadrant: SW
- Ward: 9
- Established: 1911 (Rideau Park)
- 1923 (Roxboro)

Government
  - Mayor: Jeromy Farkas
  - Administrative body: Calgary City Council
  - Councillor: Nathaniel Schmidt (Independent)

Area
  - Total: 1.0 km^{2} (0.39 sq mi)
- Elevation: 1,055 m (3,461 ft)

Population (2006)
  - Total: 413
  - Average Income: $153,667
- Website: Roxboro Community Association

Roxboro is an inner city residential neighbourhood in the southwest quadrant of Calgary, Alberta, Canada. It is bounded to the north and west by the Elbow River and to the south by 33 Avenue SW of Roxboro, in a bend of the Elbow River, lies the community of Rideau Park.

Rideau Park was established in 1911, and Roxboro in 1923. Buildings from that period still stand today. Both were designated as communities of the city in 1967. It is represented in the Calgary City Council by the Ward 9 councillor.

== Demographics ==
In the City of Calgary's 2012 municipal census, Roxboro had a population of 421 living in 161 dwellings, a -4.5% increase from its 2011 population of 441. With a land area of 0.3 km^{2} (0.12 sq mi), it had a population density of 1,400/km^{2} (3,600/sq mi) in 2012. Also in the 2012 municipal census, Rideau Park had a population of 636 living in 342 dwellings, a 1.4% increase from its 2011 population of 627. With a land area of 0.3 km^{2} (0.12 sq mi), it had a population density of 2,100/km^{2} (5,500/sq mi) in 2012.

Roxboro is one of Calgary's wealthiest neighbourhoods. Residents in this community had a median household income of $153,667 in 2000, and there were no low income residents living in the neighbourhood. As of 2000, 12.5% of the residents were immigrants. All buildings were single-family detached homes, and none of the housing was used for renting. In Rideau Park, a proportion of 49.1% of the buildings were condominiums or apartments, and 13% of the housing was used for renting.

== Education ==
The community is served by the Rideau Park Elementary & Junior High public school.

== See also ==
- List of neighbourhoods in Calgary
