= CFB Calgary =

Former military base in Alberta, Canada

- Lincoln Park, Calgary in Canada

Site information
- Open to the public: Yes

Location
- Coordinates: 51.013°N 114.127°W

Site history
- Built: 1935
- In use: 1935-1996
- Fate: Decommissioned and redeveloped

Garrison information
- Occupants: Headquarters, 1 Combat Group; 1st Fort Garry Horse; 1 Signal Squadron; 1st Battalion Princess Patricia's Canadian Light Infantry; Princess Patricia's Canadian Light Infantry Band; Headquarters, 7 Tactical Air Unit (TAU); 1 Service Battalion; The Queen's Own Rifles of Canada; 1 Military Police Platoon (current); Lord Strathcona's Horse (Royal Canadians); Headquarters, 41 Canadian Brigade Group (current); 41 Service Battalion (current)

Canadian Forces Base Calgary, also CFB Calgary, was a Canadian Forces Base in Calgary, Alberta.

== Currie Barracks ==
Currie Barracks, 1948

The Canadian Militia opened the Currie Barracks on the southwestern edge of Calgary in 1935, occupying a property on the level plateau above the south slope of the Bow River valley. The facility was named after the recently deceased General Sir Arthur Currie, commander of the Canadian Expeditionary Force on the Western Front during World War I.

Over the next decade, the facility housed a combination of personnel from the Canadian Infantry Corps and Royal Canadian Army Service Corps, along with personnel from the Royal Canadian Air Force (RCAF).

During the Second World War a triangular air strip was constructed on the property, south of the Barracks. Two British Commonwealth Air Training Plan stations operated out of the facility: No. 3 Service Flying Training School, with seven hangars on the north end of the strip, and No. 10 Repair Depot, with eleven hangars on the south end of the strip. The air strip was officially closed in 1964, and was removed several years later.

During the war, the Currie Barracks became an army training centre for units mobilized in southern Alberta; it was designated A-16. These mobilized units were tasked to provide reinforcements for The Calgary Highlanders and The Seaforth Highlanders of Canada.

Following the war in 1946, the Currie Barracks became home to Lord Strathcona's Horse (Royal Canadians) and 1st Battalion, Princess Patricia's Canadian Light Infantry as part of Canada's transition to having an expanded regular force army during the early years of the Cold War. The Currie Barracks underwent rapid expansion during the Korean War as the facility transformed into a major military centre, owing to its convenient access to the Canadian Pacific Railway's transcontinental mainline to Vancouver three kilometres to the north. Headquarters Calgary Garrison was formed on October 26, 1950 in response to the need to coordinate the administration of army units stationed at and cycling through the Currie Barracks; thus the facility also began to use the names Calgary Garrison and Calgary Barracks.

== Harvey Barracks ==
Harvey Barracks, 1964

In 1910 the Canadian military established Camp Sarcee on a piece of land expropriated from the Tsuu T'ina First Nation at the southwest corner of Calgary. Throughout the First World War the camp served as the training place for the 10th and 50th battalions of the Canadian Expeditionary Force.

Following the Second World War the camp was re-established as Sarcee Barracks, being constructed during 1957 and opening in 1958. The new base contained a parade square, firing range, ropes course, school, housing, running track, and garages. In 1968 Sarcee Barracks was united with Currie Barracks to form CFB Calgary, and in 1981 the base was renamed "Harvey Barracks" after Frederick Harvey.

== CFB Calgary's units, past and present ==
The pending unification of the Royal Canadian Navy, Canadian Army, and Royal Canadian Air Force to form the Canadian Forces on February 1, 1968, precipitated a number of major changes to Canada's military. As a result, the Currie Barracks were redesignated Canadian Forces Base Calgary (CFB Calgary) on March 14, 1966.

As a former Canadian Army facility, the newly designated CFB Calgary fell under Force Mobile Command, the new command for Canada's land forces. Camp Wainwright at Denwood, Alberta, became a satellite auxiliary training camp under the jurisdiction of CFB Calgary on January 1, 1967, however the facility became a separately controlled base (CFB Wainwright) on August 1 of that year.

CFB Calgary was reorganized by Mobile Command on February 20, 1969, when 1 Combat Group was combined with the base itself; both the base and 1 Combat Group reported to a single commander. The base was tasked with providing administrative and support services to units posted to it in support of 1 Combat Group operations.

Initial lodger units at CFB Calgary included:

- Headquarters, 1 Combat Group
- 1st Fort Garry Horse
- 1 Signal Squadron
- 1st Battalion Princess Patricia's Canadian Light Infantry
- Princess Patricia's Canadian Light Infantry Band
- Headquarters, 7 Tactical Air Unit (TAU)
- 1 Service Battalion (The base was officially closed by the 1 Svc Bn Operations Officer Captain Stewart Campbell CD (Ret'd).)

The force structure evolved as the 1st Fort Garry Horse was disbanded in 1970 as the regiment reverted to reserve status. The Queen's Own Rifles of Canada and the 1 Military Police Platoon along with Lord Strathcona's Horse (Royal Canadians) were garrisoned at CFB Calgary beginning in the 1960s.

In September 1991, the 1 Canadian Brigade Group and CFB Calgary became independent of each other under separate commands and reported to Land Force Western Area.

Despite the closure of CFB Calgary in 1998, three Reserve Force units of the Canadian Army remain at the site. These units consist of the Headquarters, 41 Canadian Brigade Group, 41 Service Battalion, and 41 Combat Engineer Regiment. Two corps of the Royal Canadian Army Cadets, the 2554 PPCLI RCACC and the 1292 LdsH RCACC, continue to train at the old base.

== Closure and redevelopment ==
The 1996 federal budget announced that CFB Calgary would be closed in 1998 as part of a policy to close various Canadian Forces bases to consolidate units into fewer facilities. In 1998, CFB Calgary was officially decommissioned, with most of its personnel relocated to CFB Edmonton in Edmonton, Alberta.

The base closure offered a rare opportunity for Calgary to experience a comprehensive redevelopment and land use planning strategy for a large continuous property. Family residential areas within the base, known as the Currie PMQs (or private married quarters) and located east of Crowchild Trail, were redeveloped under the aegis of the Canada Lands Company as the new community of Garrison Woods. The redevelopment included the razing of some older or less marketable houses (including semi-detached houses), the upgrading and relocation of other houses, and the construction of single-family houses, townhouses, and condominium complexes. Some commercial buildings (including a Canada Safeway) were also built in the northwest corner of the former PMQ lands. The redevelopment of Garrison Woods won numerous awards from the residential development community, including the Honour Award for Planning Excellence from the Canadian Institute of Planners and the Grand SAM Award from the Canadian Home Builders' Association. An article in Maclean's magazine reported that a large number of houses were first purchased by single women.

Redevelopment of the areas west of Crowchild Trail, including military facilities, a parade ground, and single-person residential housing, began at the same time. Planning for the disposition of the land and its facilities took longer to plan out, and in the meantime warehouses and hangars were converted into offices, theatrical rehearsal spaces, and several buildings were used as studios by movie and television production companies for shows such as Honey, I Shrunk the Kids: The TV Show, Legends of the Fall and other projects, with equipment rental company William F. White International and local chapters of the International Alliance of Theatrical Stage Employees (IATSE) and Directors Guild of Canada establishing Calgary bases on the grounds. In 2004, the base lands hosted the touring company of Cirque du Soleil. As of 2025 it was home to Wild Rose Brewery and Barracks Fitness.

Clear Water Academy, a private Catholic school, was established on the former CFB Calgary property and occupied three historic buildings along Dieppe Avenue. The Calgary Farmers' Market was also located west of Crowchild Trail, in an airplane hangar on former RCAF lands, but has since moved. The Military Museums is east of Crowchild Trail in Garrison Woods.

As of 2005, plans called for most of the base to be zoned for residential use as part of the Lincoln Park neighbourhood.

== External sources ==
- Other Calgary area Army, Sea, and Air Cadets Corps/Squadrons
