= Glenbrook, Calgary =

Glenbrook
- Neighbourhood
- Location of Glenbrook in Calgary
- Coordinates: 51°01′37″N 114°09′09″W
- Country: Canada
- Province: Alberta
- City: Calgary
- Quadrant: SW
- Ward: 6
- Established: 1958
- Annexed: 1954

Government
  - Mayor: Jeromy Farkas
  - Administrative body: Calgary City Council
  - Councillor: John Pantazopoulos (Independent)

Area
  - Total: 1.9 km^{2} (0.73 sq mi)
- Elevation: 1,140 m (3,740 ft)

Population (2006)
  - Total: 6,827
  - Average Income: $42,845
- Postal code: T3E
- Website: Glenbrook Community Association

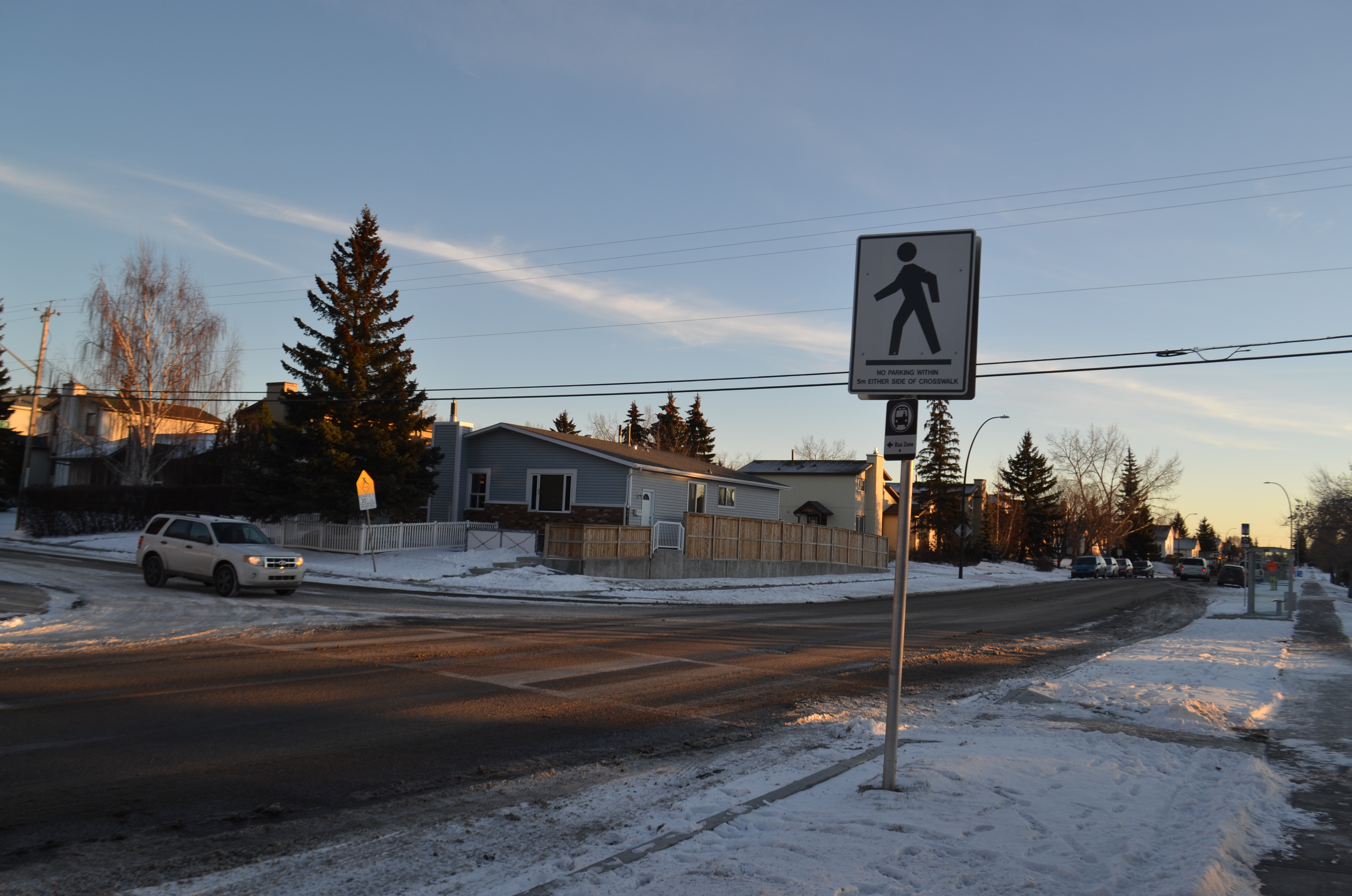
Glenbrook

Glenbrook is a residential neighbourhood in the southwest quadrant of Calgary, Alberta. It is bounded by 26 Avenue S to the north, 37 Street W to the east, Richmond Road to the south and Sarcee Trail to the west.

The land was partly annexed to the City of Calgary in 1954, and partly in 1956. Glenbrook was established in 1958. It is represented in the Calgary City Council by the Ward 6 councillor.

== Demographics ==
In the City of Calgary's 2021 municipal census, Glenbrook had a population of 7,240 living in 3,160 dwellings With a land area of 1.9 km^{2} (0.73 sq mi), it had a population density of 3,810/km^{2} (9,870/sq mi) in 2021.

Residents in this community had a median household income of $77,000 in 2021, and there were 14% low income residents living in the neighbourhood. As of 2000, 20.5% of the residents were immigrants. A proportion of 35.6% of the buildings were condominiums or apartments, and 46.1% of the housing was used for renting.

== Education ==
The community is served by A.E. Cross Junior High, Glenbrook Elementary public schools and Calgary Christian, St. Gregory Elementary-Junior High (4–9) and St. Thomas Aquinas Elementary (K-3) (Catholic schools).

== See also ==
- List of neighbourhoods in Calgary
