= The Calgary Party =

Municipal political party in Canada

- Leader: Brian Thiessen
- Founded: October 2024
- Ideology: Progressivism
- Political position: Centre
- Colours: Magenta; Turquoise; Blue
- Seats on council: 1 / 15

Website
- thecalgaryparty.ca

The Calgary Party is a centrist municipal political party in Calgary, Alberta. Lawyer and former Calgary Police Commission chair Brian Thiessen is the party's candidate for mayor in the 2025 municipal election. The party's only elected councillor is DJ Kelly.

== History ==
The Calgary Party was founded in October 2024 and registered with Elections Calgary on November 19. This followed the Alberta government's passage of Bill 20, which legalized municipal political parties in Calgary and Edmonton. The party is contesting the 2025 Calgary municipal election, running candidates for both mayor and council.

== Positions ==
Thiessen has described himself as "fiscally responsible and socially moderate" and "centrist" and has identified housing affordability, public transit, safety in Downtown, and infrastructure funding as key issues. The party supports the city's blanket rezoning policy, improving municipal services such as snow removal and fixing potholes, and increasing funding for policing and transportation.

== Candidates in the 2025 municipal election ==
Seat	Candidate
Mayor	Brian Thiessen
Ward 1	Joey Nowak
Ward 2	Candy Lam
Ward 3	Atul Chauhan
Ward 4	DJ Kelly
Ward 5	Gurpreet Dhillon
Ward 6	Inam Teja
Ward 7	Heather McRae
Ward 8	
Ward 9	Arianna Kippers
Ward 10	Nickie Brockhoff
Ward 11	Alex Williams
Ward 12	Sarah Ferguson
Ward 13	Elliot Weinstein
Ward 14	Ryan Stutt

== Election results ==
=== Mayoral election ===
Election	Candidate	Votes	%	Status	Result
2025	Brian Thiessen	40,519	11.6	5th	Lost

=== City council ===
Election	City council seats	+/–	Position	Result
2025	1 / 14	▲1	3rd	Opposition
