= Cougar Ridge, Calgary =

Cougar Ridge
- Neighbourhood
- Location of Cougar Ridge in Calgary
- Coordinates: 51°04′19″N 114°12′12″W
- Country: Canada
- Province: Alberta
- City: Calgary
- Quadrant: SW
- Ward: 6
- Established: 2001
- Annexed: 1995

Government
  - Mayor: Jeromy Farkas
  - Administrative body: Calgary City Council
  - Councillor: John Pantazopoulos (Independent)
- Elevation: 1,235 m (4,052 ft)

Population (2006)
  - Total: 4,375
  - Average Income: $100,908
- Postal code: T3H
- Website: Cougar Ridge Community Association

Cougar Ridge is a residential neighbourhood in the southwest quadrant of Calgary, Alberta. It is located at the western edge of the city and is bounded by Paskapoo Slopes and Canada Olympic Park to the north, 69 Street W to the east, 101 Street W to the west and Old Banff Coach Road to the south.

It is represented in the Calgary City Council by the Ward 6 councillor.

== Demographics ==
In the City of Calgary's 2012 municipal census, Cougar Ridge had a population of 5,874 living in 1,908 dwellings, a 1% increase from its 2011 population of 5,813. With a land area of 2.2 km^{2} (0.85 sq mi), it had a population density of 2,670/km^{2} (6,920/sq mi) in 2012.

== See also ==
- List of neighbourhoods in Calgary
