= Calgary City Council =

Legislative governing body in Alberta, Canada

Type
- Type: City Council

History
- New session started: October 29, 2025

Leadership
- Mayor of Calgary: Jeromy Farkas, Independent since October 29, 2025

Structure
- Seats: 15 (14 Councillors+Mayor)
- Political groups: Independents (9) Communities First (4) The Calgary Party (1) A Better Calgary (1)
- Committees: Boards, Commissions and Committees

Elections
- Voting system: FPTP
- Last election: October 20, 2025
- Next election: October 2029

Motto
- Onward

Meeting place
- Calgary Municipal Building

Website
- www.calgary.ca

Calgary City Council is the legislative governing body that represents the citizens of Calgary. The council consists of 15 members: the chief elected official, titled the mayor, and 14 councillors. Jeromy Farkas was elected mayor in October 2025 as the city's 38th. The mayor represents the interests of the city as a whole. Each of the 14 councillors represents one of the city's 14 wards.

== Elections ==
The mayor of Calgary is elected through a citywide vote by all eligible voters. The mayor is elected across the whole city using first past the post voting. Each councillor is elected by the largest group of constituents of each ward. The councillors represent the interests of their respective wards. The mayor and councillors hold the office for 4-year terms. The last municipal election was held on October 20, 2025.

== Governing system ==
The Calgary city government is the council-manager form of government. The mayor and councillors oversee the City Manager and the administration of the city.

Calgary's City Council is a council-policy committee system. The Council establishes its policies for governing the city based on information provided by four standing policy committees:

- Planning and Urban Development
- Transportation and Transit
- Utilities and Corporate Services
- Community and Protective Services

These committees meet once every month at City Hall and are composed of councillors and are responsible for approving and recommending policies to City Council. The general public is invited to the committee meeting to make presentations. Any decisions that come out of these meetings need final approval from the Council as a whole.

There are also a number of civic committees, boards, and authorities that help to create policies in specialized areas, such as parking, the preservation of heritage sites and buildings, and planning and development matters. These civic committees, board and authorities consist of citizens and one or more councillor.

City Council meets three Mondays every month in the Council Chambers at the Calgary Municipal Building. Two meetings are regular Council meetings, where issues from the four policy committees are discussed. The third meeting is a public hearing, where planning matters are generally discussed. Citizens do not address Council during the two regular meetings, however the public hearings are designed for the citizens to speak directly with their elected councillor regarding specific issues.

=== Financing ===
The city had an operating budget of $2.1 billion for 2007, supported 41% by property taxes. $757 million in property taxes are collected annually, with $386 million from residential and $371 million from non-residential properties. 54% of the budget is spent for wages of the 13,043 city employees and expenditures. The average Calgary household pays approximately $2,100 per year in city tax.

== History ==
In addition to the elections, democratic accountability was produced in other ways. Plebiscites were held at various times through the years to guide the city council.

=== Mayor ===
From 1884 to 1923, mayoralty elections were held annually. A plebiscite held in 1923 increased the term in office for the mayor from one to two years. In 1968, the Municipal Act increased the term in office by one year, for a total of three years. In 2013, the term for mayor was amended in the Local Authorities Election Act to 4 years.

=== City Commissioners ===
Calgary had city commissioners from early 1900s into the 1950s. The city elected its city commissioners in the 1910s and 1920s. Otherwise they were appointed by the city council. The city of Calgary continues to have six commissioners that are appointed for life. Their names are listed in past City Handbooks but have since been removed from newer editions.

=== Councillors ===
From 1884 to 1886, four councillors were selected from the town. In 1894, Calgary was divided into three wards, increasing the number of councillors to six. Later, three aldermen represented each ward. In 1906, a fourth ward was created, bringing the total number of aldermen to 12. From 1914 to 1960, aldermen were elected from across the city for two-year terms, dismantling the ward system. Staggered elections made half the council up for election each year. Commissioners were also elected in the early years. From 1917 to 1971, councillors were elected using single transferable votes to achieve a degree of proportionality/ fairness. After a plebiscite in 1960 the ward system was re-established in the city. Six wards were established, each represented by two aldermen. In 1974, voters had up to two votes under the block voting system to elect the two councillors in their ward. In 1976, the number of wards expanded to 14 (current number) with one alderman representing each ward for three years (and voters having only one vote). On December 14, 2010, council voted to change the title to councillor, which took effect in the October 2013 election. In 2012 the Local Authorities Election Act was amended to increase the term length to 4 years.

== Wards, communities and councillors ==
Ward	Councillor	Party	Terms in office	Communities
Mayor	Jeromy Farkas	Independent	2025–present (1 term)	Calgary
Ward 1	Kim Tyers	Communities First	2025–present (1 term)	Bowness, Crestmont, Greenwood/Greenbriar, Haskayne, Osprey Hill, Rocky Ridge, Royal Oak, Scenic Acres, Silver Springs, Tuscany, Valley Ridge, Varsity
Ward 2	Jennifer Wyness	Independent	2021–present (2 terms)	Ambleton, Arbour Lake, Citadel, Evanston, Glacier Ridge, Hamptons, Hawkwood, Kincora, Nolan Hill, Ranchlands, Sage Hill, Sherwood, Symons Valley Ranch
Ward 3	Andrew Yule	Independent	2025–present (1 term)	Carrington, Country Hills, Country Hills Village, Coventry Hills, Harvest Hills, Hidden Valley, Keystone Hills, Lewisburg, Livingston, MacEwan Glen, Panorama Hills, Sandstone Valley
Ward 4	DJ Kelly	The Calgary Party	2025–present (1 term)	Beddington Heights, Brentwood, Cambrian Heights, Charleswood, Collingwood, Dalhousie, Edgemont, Greenview, Highland Park, Highwood, Huntington Hills, North Haven, Queens Park Village, Rosemont, Thorncliffe, Winston Heights/Mountview
Ward 5	Raj Dhaliwal	Independent	2021–present (2 terms)	Castleridge, Cornerstone, Falconridge, Homestead, Martindale, Redstone, Saddle Ridge, Skyview Ranch, Taradale
Ward 6	John Pantazopoulos	Independent	2025–present (1 term)	Aspen Woods, Christie Park, Coach Hill, Cougar Ridge, Discovery Ridge, Glamorgan, Glenbrook, Glendale, Medicine Hill, Patterson, Signal Hill, Springbank Hill, Spruce Cliff, Strathcona Park, West Springs, Westgate, Wildwood
Ward 7	Myke Atkinson	Independent	2025–present (1 term)	Banff Trail, Capitol Hill, Chinatown, Crescent Heights, Downtown Commercial Core, Downtown East Village, Downtown West End, Eau Claire, Hillhurst, Hounsfield Heights/Briar Hill, Montgomery, Mount Pleasant, Parkdale, Point Mckay, Rosedale, St. Andrews Heights, Sunnyside, Tuxedo Park, University District, University Heights, University of Calgary, West Hillhurst
Ward 8	Nathaniel Schmidt	Independent	2025–present (1 term)	Altadore, Bankview, Beltline, Britannia, Cliff Bungalow, Currie Barracks, Elbow Park, Elboya, Erlton, Garrison Woods, Killarney/Glengarry, Lincoln Park, Lower Mount Royal, Mission, Parkhill, Richmond, Rideau Park, Rosscarrock, Roxboro, Rutland Park, Scarboro, Scarboro/Sunalta West, Shaganappi, South Calgary, Sunalta, Upper Mount Royal
Ward 9	Harrison Clark	Independent	2025–present (1 term)	Albert Park/Radisson Heights, Applewood Park, Belvedere, Bridgeland/Riverside, Dover, Erin Woods, Forest Heights, Forest Lawn, Inglewood, Manchester, Ogden, Penbrooke Meadows, Ramsay, Red Carpet, Renfrew, Southview, Twinhills
Ward 10	Andre Chabot	Communities First	2005–2017, 2021–present (6 terms)	Abbeydale, Coral Springs, Marlborough, Marlborough Park, Mayland Heights, Monterey Park, Pineridge, Rundle, Temple, Vista Heights, Whitehorn
Ward 11	Rob Ward	Communities First	2025–present (1 term)	Acadia, Bayview, Bel-Aire, Braeside, Cedarbrae, Chinook Park, Douglasdale/Glen, Eagle Ridge, Fairview, Garrison Green, Haysboro, Kelvin Grove, Kingsland, Lakeview, Maple Ridge, Mayfair, Meadowlark Park, North Glenmore Park, Oakridge, Palliser, Pump Hill, Riverbend, Southwood, Willow Park, Windsor Park
Ward 12	Mike Jamieson	A Better Calgary Party	2025–present (1 term)	Auburn Bay, Copperfield, Cranston, Hotchkiss, Mahogany, McKenzie Towne, New Brighton, Rangeview, Seton, Shepard
Ward 13	Dan McLean	Communities First	2025–present (2 terms)	Alpine Park, Belmont, Bridlewood, Canyon Meadows, Evergreen, Millrise, Pine Creek, Shawnee Slopes, Shawnessy, Silverado, Somerset, Woodbine, Woodlands, Yorkville
Ward 14	Landon Johnston	Independent	2025–present (1 term)	Bonavista Downs, Chaparral, Deer Ridge, Deer Run, Diamond Cove, Lake Bonavista, Legacy, McKenzie Lake, Midnapore, Parkland, Queensland, Sundance, Walden, Wolf Willow

== See also ==
- List of mayors of Calgary
- List of Calgary municipal elections
- List of neighbourhoods in Calgary
