= Spruce Cliff, Calgary =

Spruce Cliff
- Neighbourhood
- Location of Spruce Cliff in Calgary
- Coordinates: 51°03′02″N 114°08′22″W
- Country: Canada
- Province: Alberta
- City: Calgary
- Quadrant: SW
- Ward: 8
- Established: 1950
- Annexed: 1910

Government
  - Mayor: Jeromy Farkas
  - Administrative body: Calgary City Council
  - Councillor: Nathaniel Schmidt (Independent)

Area
  - Total: 0.6 km^{2} (0.23 sq mi)
- Elevation: 1,125 m (3,691 ft)

Population (2006)
  - Total: 2,827
  - Average Income: $42,025
- Postal code: T3C
- Website: Spruce Cliff Community Association

Abandoned house in the Calgary community of Spruce Cliff

Spruce Cliff is a residential neighbourhood in the southwest quadrant of Calgary, Alberta. It is bounded to the north by the CPR tracks and the Bow River, to the east by the Shaganappi golf course and 33 Street W, to the south by Bow Trail and to the west by 38 Street W.

The land was annexed in 1910, and Spruce Cliff was established in 1950. It is represented in the Calgary City Council by the Ward 6 councillor.

== Demographics ==
In the City of Calgary's 2012 municipal census, Spruce Cliff had a population of 4,285 living in 2,344 dwellings, a 7.3% increase from its 2011 population of 3,992. With a land area of 1.1 km^{2} (0.42 sq mi), it had a population density of 3,900/km^{2} (10,100/sq mi) in 2012.

Residents in this community had a median household income of $42,025 in 2000, and there were 31.8% low income residents living in the neighbourhood. As of 2000, 28% of the residents were immigrants. A proportion of 53.8% of the buildings were condominiums or apartments, and 65.1% of the housing was used for renting.

== Education ==
The community is served by Spruce Cliff Elementary public school.

== See also ==
- List of neighbourhoods in Calgary
