= Lincoln Park, Calgary =

Lincoln Park
- Neighbourhood
- Location of Lincoln Park in Calgary
- Coordinates: 51°00′41″N 114°08′16″W
- Country: Canada
- Province: Alberta
- City: Calgary
- Quadrant: SW
- Ward: 11

Government
  - Mayor: Jeromy Farkas
  - Administrative body: Calgary City Council
  - Councillor: Rob Ward (Communities First)
- Elevation: 1,130 m (3,710 ft)

Population (2006)
  - Total: 2,425
  - Average Income: $30,411
- Postal code: T3E

Lincoln Park is a neighbourhood in the southwest quadrant of Calgary, Alberta located north of Glenmore Trail and west of Crowchild Trail. Notable landmarks in the neighbourhood include Mount Royal University and the ATCO Industrial Park. The neighbourhood is located on the section of the former Canadian Forces Base Calgary that during World War II was a Royal Canadian Air Force airfield; the name of the district derives from a small area of military housing located between 54th Avenue S.W. and Glenmore Trail which was reserved for United States Air Force members stationed at the airfield during World War II.

== Demographics ==
In the City of Calgary's 2012 municipal census, Lincoln Park had a population of 2,505 living in 1,413 dwellings, a 0.2% increase from its 2011 population of 2,501. With a land area of 1.5 km^{2} (0.58 sq mi), it had a population density of 1,670/km^{2} (4,330/sq mi) in 2012.

Residents in this community had a median household income of $30,411 in 2000, and there were 28.9% low income residents living in the neighbourhood. As of 2000, 18.8% of the residents were immigrants. A proportion of 62.7% of the buildings were condominiums or apartments, and 62.7% of the buildings was rented. The residential sector is made up completely of rental housing.

== See also ==
- List of neighbourhoods in Calgary
