= Communities First (political party) =

Municipal political party in Canada

- Leader: Sonya Sharp
- Founded: December 2024
- Ideology: Conservatism
- Political position: Right-wing
- Colours: Blue
- Seats on council: 4 / 15

Website
- communitiesfirstyyc.com

Communities First is a conservative municipal political party in Calgary, Alberta, founded by four incumbent city councillors ahead of the city's 2025 municipal election. Councillor Sonya Sharp ran as the party's mayoral candidate, placing second. The party's elected councillors are Andre Chabot, Dan McLean, Kim Tyers, and Rob Ward.

== History ==
Communities First was founded in December 2024 by four independent councillors and was registered with Elections Calgary on February 18, 2025. The party was founded in response to the Alberta government's legalization of municipal political parties in Calgary and Edmonton ahead of the province's 2025 municipal elections; though several of their candidates criticized the introduction of parties to municipal politics, they expressed concern that incumbent councillors could be defeated by candidates from other parties if they did not form their own. The party intends to run a full slate of candidates for mayor and council. On March 31, 2025, councillor Sonya Sharp announced she would be running as the party's mayoral candidate.

== Positions ==
Communities First's candidates have described it as a "non-party party" and "a caucus with like-minded individuals" that will not impose strict party discipline on its councillors. They have criticized city council as "dysfunctional" and failing to represent the views of constituents, promising to focus on community representation over ideology. Their priorities include government efficiency, a focus on basic responsibilities such as filling potholes and fixing roads, maintaining low taxes, and public safety. They are opposed to Calgary's blanket rezoning policy, instead favouring development policies that allow higher density while preserving community character.

== Candidates in the 2025 municipal election ==
Seat	Candidate
Mayor	Sonya Sharp
Ward 1	Kim Tyers
Ward 2	
Ward 3	
Ward 4	Jeremy Wong
Ward 5	
Ward 6	
Ward 7	Terry Wong
Ward 8	Cornelia Wiebe
Ward 9	Alison Karim-McSwiney
Ward 10	Andre Chabot
Ward 11	Rob Ward
Ward 12	Shane Byciuk
Ward 13	Dan McLean
Ward 14	

== Electoral performance ==
=== Mayoral election ===
Election	Candidate	Votes	%	Status	Result
2025	Sonya Sharp	90,480	26.0	2nd	Lost

=== City council ===
Election	City council seats	+/–	Position	Result
2025	4 / 14	▲4	2nd	Opposition
