= Forest Lawn High School =

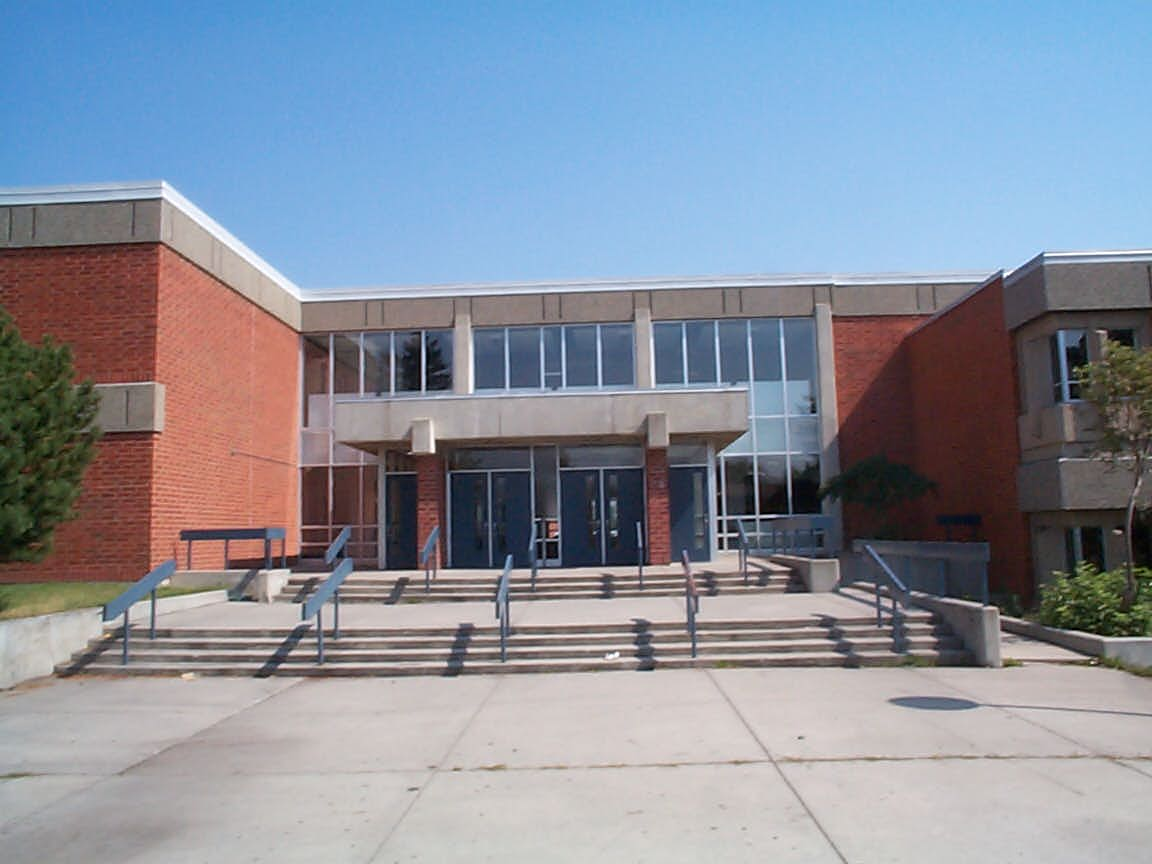

Location
- 1304 - 44 Street S.E. Calgary, Alberta, T2A 1M8; Canada; 51.041°N 113.970°W

Information
- School type: High school
- Motto: Viator via veritatis (Travel by way of truth)
- Established: 1968
- School board: Calgary Board of Education
- Superintendent: Joanne Pittman
- School number: b813
- Principal: Alex Fotopoulos
- Grades: 10–12
- Enrollment: 1286 (2021)
  - Grade 10: 459
  - Grade 11: 379
  - Grade 12: 448
- Language: English
- Area: Area III
- Colours: Red, Gold and White
- Mascot: Titans
- Team name: The Forest Lawn Titans
- Communities served: Forest Lawn, Abbeydale, Albert Park, Applewood Park, Dover, Erin Woods, Forest Heights, Marlborough, Marlborough Park, Penbrooke Meadows, Pineridge, Radisson Heights, Red Carpet/Mountview Mobile Home Park, Rundle, Southview, Red Stone and Skyview Ranch
- Website: school.cbe.ab.ca/school/ForestLawn/Pages/default.aspx

Forest Lawn High School is a high school in Calgary, Alberta, Canada in the southeast community of Forest Lawn. The senior high school has sports teams, who are known as the Titans, drama productions, dance, band, and choir. The school is located on 44th street, and is near Ernest Morrow Junior High, Jack James Senior High, Bob Bahan Memorial Pool, and Ernie Star Arena.

Forest Lawn serves the communities of Abbeydale, Albert Park, Applewood Park, Dover, Erin Woods, Forest Heights, Forest Lawn, Marlborough, Marlborough Park, Penbrooke Meadows, Pineridge, Radisson Heights, Red Carpet/Mountview Mobile Home Park, Rundle, Southview, Temple, and Whitehorn. Junior high feeder schools to Forest Lawn High School are Ernest Morrow, Ian Bazalgette, Langevin, and Sir Wilfrid Laurier, Dr. Gladys McKelvie Egbert, Bob Edwards, Clarence Sansom, Dr. Gordon Higgins, Annie Gale.

== About the school ==
The school was built in 1968 and is situated on 25.0 acres. The school has 84 classrooms, a full commercial foods kitchen, a cosmetology program and a full auto motives service program featuring auto-mechanics, auto-body and welding courses at all three grade levels. Forest Lawn also offers Advanced Placement courses in the four core subjects and a full range of academic and complementary courses. The school was named after the community that it serves (Forest Lawn).

The school provides French/Spanish and English language as a primary language instruction. The school offers various performing and visual arts programs, and offers a certificate to recognize students that have made fine arts a focus of learning at the high school level.

The school is part of the Action for Bright Children Society.

== Notable alumni ==
- Jevon Cottoy (2014), professional football player
