= Forest Heights, Calgary =

Calgary neighbourhood

Forest Heights
- Neighbourhood
- Location of Forest Heights in Calgary
- Coordinates: 51°02′57″N 113°58′09″W
- Country: Canada
- Province: Alberta
- City: Calgary
- Quadrant: SE
- Ward: 9
- Established: 1959

Area
  - Total: 1.50 km^{2} (0.58 sq mi)

Population (2021)
  - Total: 5,985
- Postal Code: T2A

Forest Heights is a residential community in the southeast quadrant of Calgary, Alberta, Canada. Forest Heights is represented under Ward 9.

Forest Heights is not to be confused with Forest Lawn, which sits directly to the south of the community. These two communities are listed as distinct identities from one-another by the City of Calgary.

The community is part of an group of communities known as the Greater Forest Lawn area, with the term coming from the former town of Forest Lawn which used to exist in the area prior to being annexed by the city of Calgary. Other communities in this area include Forest Lawn, Southview, Penbrooke Meadows, Dover, and Red Carpet.

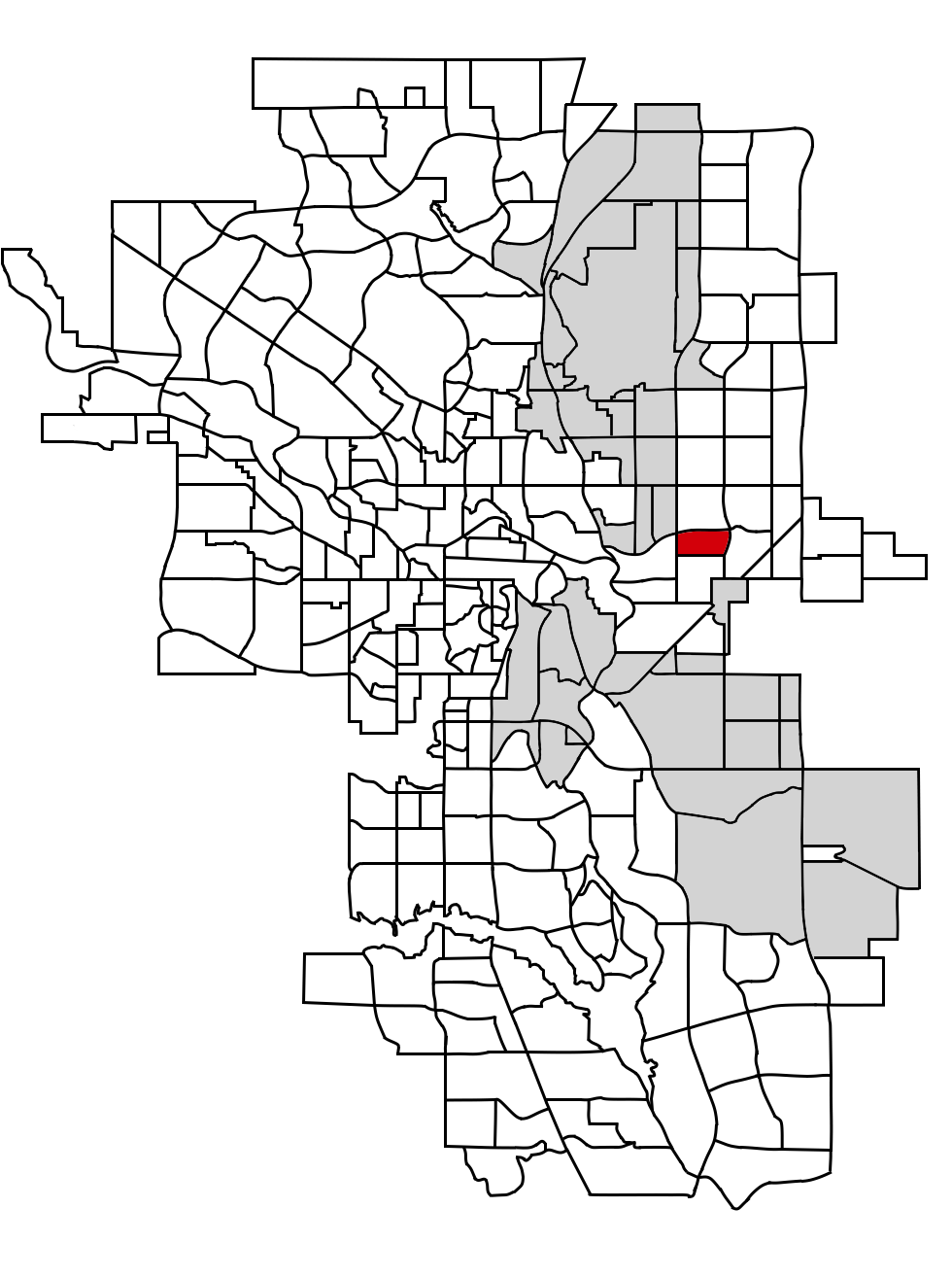
Location of Forest Heights in Calgary

== Community boundaries ==
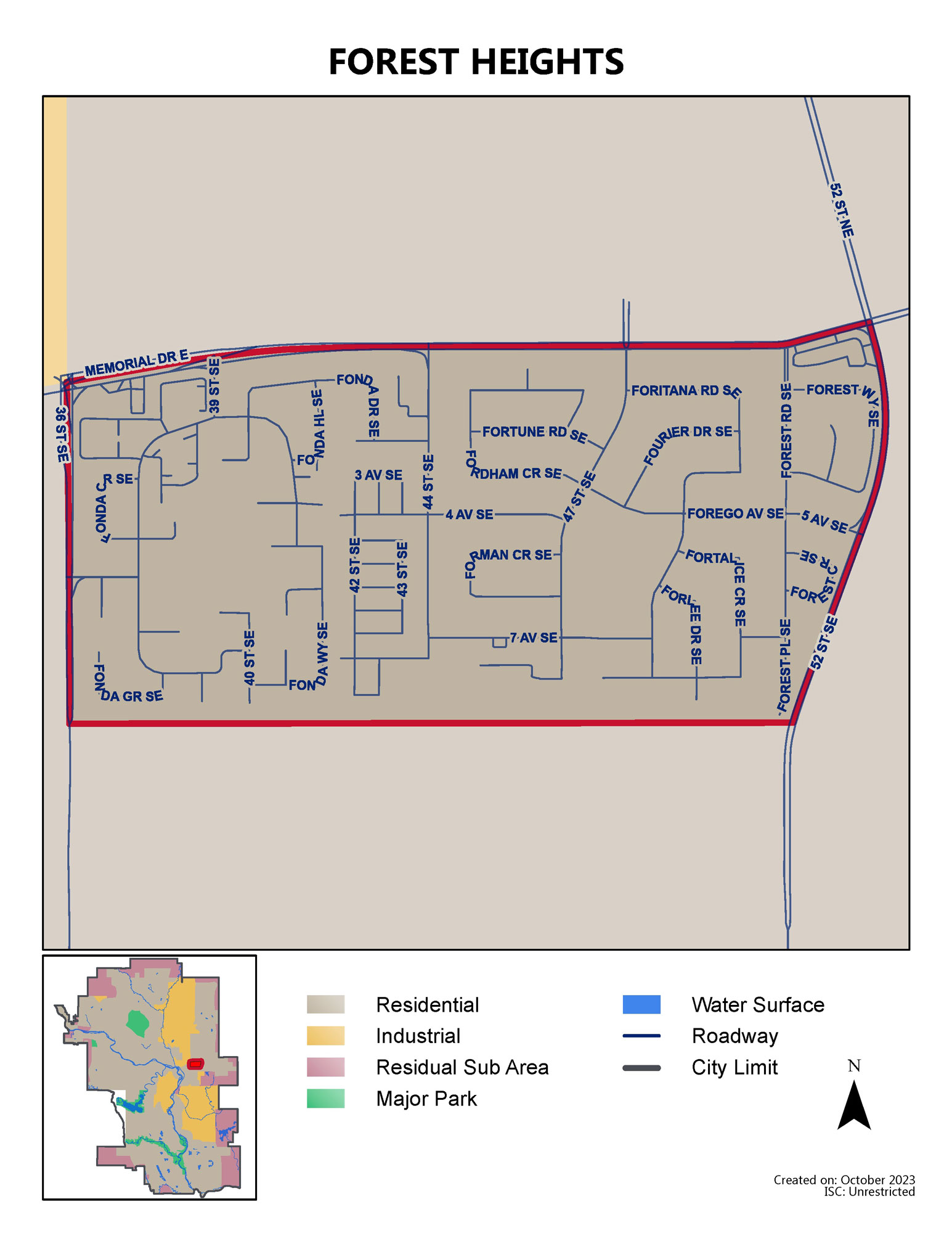
Map of the community boundaries of Forest Heights, according to the City of Calgary

The community of Forest Heights is located in the southeast quadrant of Calgary. It is bounded by Memorial Drive to the north, 36 Street SE to the west, 8 Avenue SE to the south, and 52 Street SE to the east. Albert Park/Radisson Heights sits directly to the west of the community, Forest Lawn sits directly to the south of the community, Penbrooke Meadows to the east, and Marlborough to the north.

== History ==
Forest Heights was established as a community in 1959, under the former town of Forest Lawn. Forest Lawn was later annexed into the city of Calgary in 1961, with Forest Heights being incorporated into a neighborhood

== Population and demographics ==
=== Population ===
According to the 2021 Calgary municipal census, the community of Forest Heights had a population of 5985, a decrease from its 2019 population of 6496.

Pop. Overtime
Year	Population
2014	6,511
2015	6,648
2016	6,538
2017	6,406
2018	6,422
2019	6,496
2021	5,985

=== Income ===
According to the 2021 Calgary municipal census, Forest Heights had a median household income of $79,000, compared to the city-wide median of $98,000. Twenty-five percent of households spent 30% or more of their income on shelter, compared to the city-wide average of 23%. 14% of households in Forest Heights were classified as low-income, in comparison to the city-wide average of 9%.

=== Demographics ===
According to the 2021 Calgary municipal census, 41% of Forest Heights' population were immigrants, compared to the Calgary city-wide average of 32%. The majority of Forest Heights' immigrant population are of Asian descent at 66%.

== See also ==
- List of neighbourhoods in Calgary
