= 36 Street E/Métis Trail =

Street in Calgary, Alberta

36 Street E / Métis Trail
- Length: 23.3 km (14.5 mi)
- Location: Calgary, Alberta
- 36 Street E / Métis Trail
- Length: 19.8 km (12.3 mi)
- South end: 50 Avenue SE
- Major junctions: Peigan Trail; 17 Avenue SE; Memorial Drive; 16 Avenue NE (Highway 1); 32 Avenue NE; McKnight Boulevard; 64 Avenue NE; Country Hills Boulevard; Stoney Trail (Highway 201)
- North end: 144 Avenue NE (Calgary city limits)
- 36 Street NE (north section)
- Length: 10.0 km (6.2 mi)
- South end: 48 Avenue NE
- Major junctions: Airport Trail; Country Hills Boulevard
- North end: 128 Avenue NE / Barlow Circle (future)
- Dwight McLellan Trail
- Length: 3.5 km (2.2 mi)
- Location: Rocky View County
- South end: 144 Avenue NE (Calgary city limits)
- North end: Hwy 566

36 Street E, Métis Trail, and Dwight McLellan Trail is a major arterial road in eastern Calgary and Rocky View County, Alberta. It connects with residential neighborhoods and commercial corridors in northeast Calgary.

Métis Trail, a developing freeway along the east side of Calgary International Airport, and becomes Dwight McLellan Trail upon reaching Rocky View County. The combined length of the roadway is about 23 kilometres (15 mi).

== Route description ==
=== 36 Street E ===
36 Street SE begins at 50 Avenue SE in an industrial area next to the CNR Sarcee Yard. North of Peigan Trail, 36 Street SE passes through residential areas of Greater Forest Lawn before crossing into the northeast quadrant at Memorial Drive, becoming 36 Street NE.

North of Memorial Drive, 36 Street NE becomes a commercial and retail corridor, passing northeast Calgary's main shopping malls of Marlborough Mall and Sunridge Mall, as well as Pacific Place Mall and the Peter Lougheed Hospital. The Blue Line of the CTrain LRT runs between the northbound and southbound lanes, with stations located at Marlborough (near Marlborough Mall), Rundle (near Sunridge Mall), and Whitehorn station. Unlike Crowchild Trail which is grade-separated, most cross streets are signalized intersections with at-grade LRT crossings. At McKnight Boulevard, 36 Street NE becomes Métis Trail.

A northern section of 36 Street NE exists as a collector road northeast of the McKnight Boulevard / Métis Trail / 36 Street NE interchange. Beginning at 48 Avenue NE, which continues west to Barlow Trail, it follows the former road allowance along the eastern boundary of the Calgary International Airport, to Country Hills Boulevard. It serves as the eastern terminus for Airport Trail, just east of the Airport Tunnel, and was expanded in 2013 to handle additional traffic. As part of the development of the Stonegate Landing business park, the plan is reconstruct 36 Street NE north of Country Hills Boulevard to 128 Avenue NE and become Barlow Circle.

=== Métis Trail ===
Métis Trail begins at McKnight Boulevard and continues north as a limited-access road. Just north of the McKnight Boulevard interchange, the CTrain shifts to the east side of the roadway. Métis Trail diverts slightly to the northeast, before continuing north beyond 64 Avenue NE as a 4-6 lane roadway, . The roadway continues north, crossing Stoney Trail before leaving the City of Calgary. Métis Trail was originally constructed with provision to be upgraded to freeway standards; however, the City of Calgary has since downgraded the classification to an arterial street so it remains to be seen if the route will ever be upgraded. Métis Trail functions as a boundary between residential areas to the east and commercial and light industrial to the west.

The roadway was originally known as 36 Street NE south of 64 Avenue NE and 44 Street NE to the north; it was renamed to Métis Trail in 2006.

=== Dwight McLellan Trail ===
Dwight McLellan Trail begins at the Calgary city limits at 144 Avenue NE, just north of the Stoney Trail interchange. It continues through Wagon Wheel Industrial Park in Rocky View County to Highway 566 before it continues north as Range Road 293. It functions as an alternate access from Calgary to CrossIron Mills and Century Downs Racetrack and Casino. The roadway is named after the late Dwight McLellan, a Calgary businessman and real estate developer who envisioned the commercial and horse racetrack development, but died in 2008 prior to the start of construction.

=== Neighborhoods ===
- Foothills Industrial Park
- Golden Triangle (industrial)
- Eastfield (industrial)
- Erin Woods
- Dover
- Southview
- Forest Lawn
- Forest Heights
- Albert Park/Radisson Heights
- Marlborough
- Franklin Park (industrial)
- Rundle
- Whitehorn
- Sunridge Business Park
- Horizon Industrial Park
- Westwinds Business Park
- Castleridge
- Martindale
- Saddle Ridge
- Cityscape
- Skyview Ranch
- Redstone
- Stonegate Landing (industrial)

== Major intersections ==
From north to south.

| Location | km | mi | Destinations | Notes |
|---|---|---|---|---|
| Calgary | 0.0 | 0.0 | 50 Avenue SE | As 36 Street SE; adjacent to CNR Sarcee Yard |
| Calgary | 0.7 | 0.43 | Peigan Trail | |
| Calgary | 3.3 | 2.1 | 17 Avenue SE | |
| Calgary | 4.9 | 3.0 | Memorial Drive | CTrain enters median north of intersection; becomes 36 Street NE |
| Calgary | 5.3 | 3.3 | 4 Avenue NE | Access to Marlborough Mall |
| Calgary | 5.5 | 3.4 | 5 Avenue NE | Access to Marlborough Mall |
| Calgary | 5.5– 5.8 | 3.4– 3.6 | Marlborough station (located in median) | |
| Calgary | 6.5– 6.7 | 4.0– 4.2 | 16 Avenue NE (Highway 1) | Partial cloverleaf interchange (traffic signals) |
| Calgary | 6.5– 6.7 | 4.0– 4.2 | Sunridge Way | No northbound exit |
| Calgary | 7.1 | 4.4 | 20 Avenue NE / Rundlehorn Drive | Access to Sunridge Mall |
| Calgary | 7.4– 7.6 | 4.6– 4.7 | Rundle station (located in median) | |
| Calgary | 7.8 | 4.8 | 26 Avenue NE | Access to Peter Lougheed Centre |
| Calgary | 8.2 | 5.1 | 32 Avenue NE | |
| Calgary | 8.6– 8.8 | 5.3– 5.5 | Whitehorn station (located in median) | |
| Calgary | 9.5– 10.3 | 5.9– 6.4 | McKnight Boulevard | Combination interchange; CTrain exits median north of interchange |
| Calgary | 9.5– 10.3 | 5.9– 6.4 | South end of 36 Street NE • North end of Métis Trail | |
| Calgary | 11.7 | 7.3 | 64 Avenue NE | Access to McKnight–Westwinds station |
| Calgary | 13.3 | 8.3 | 80 Avenue NE | |
| Calgary | 14.9 | 9.3 | Airport Trail | Access to Calgary International Airport |
| Calgary | 16.5 | 10.3 | Country Hills Boulevard | |
| Calgary | 18.7– 19.1 | 11.6– 11.9 | Stoney Trail (Highway 201) | Partial cloverleaf interchange (traffic signals); exit 62 on Hwy 201 |
| Calgary | 19.8 | 12.3 | 144 Avenue NE | Calgary city limits |
| Rocky View County | 19.8 | 12.3 | South end of Métis Trail • North end of Dwight McLellan Trail | |
| Rocky View County | 21.6 | 13.4 | CrossIron Drive | Access to CrossIron Mills and Century Downs |
| Rocky View County | 22.9 | 14.2 | CrossIron Road / Wagon Wheel Boulevard | Access to CrossIron Mills |
| Rocky View County | 31.1 | 19.3 | Highway 566 to Highway 2 – Airdrie, Calgary | |
| Rocky View County | 31.1 | 19.3 | Range Road 293 | Continues north |
1.000 mi = 1.609 km; 1.000 km = 0.621 mi: Incomplete access; Route transition

== See also ==
- Transportation in Calgary
