= East Calgary, Alberta =

East Calgary
- Former village
- Location of East Calgary in Alberta
- Coordinates: 51.043°N 113.941°W
- Country: Canada
- Province: Alberta
- Census division: No. 6
- Municipality: City of Calgary
- Incorporated: April 17, 1916
- Dissolved: July 17, 1919

Government
  - Governing body: Calgary City Council
- Time zone: UTC-7 (MST)

East Calgary is a former village in Alberta, Canada that is now within the City of Calgary. Located on the north side of 17 Avenue SE (Highway 1A) between 60 Street SE and 84 Street SE, East Calgary held village status for just over three years between 1916 and 1919.

== History ==
The Village of East Calgary was incorporated on April 17, 1916. The village was dissolved on July 17, 1919 and became under the jurisdiction of the Municipal District of Shepard No. 220.

== Geography ==
The Village of East Calgary comprised four quarter sections of land located on the north side of 17 Avenue SE (Highway 1A) between 60 Street SE and 84 Street SE. (Note: This location is based on the legal descriptions presented within the notice that erected the village, which stated "... South-east quarter of Section 14 and Legal Subdivisions 1, 2, 3, 4, 5, 6, 7, 8, 9, 10, 11 and 12 of Section 13, all in Township 24 Range 29 west of the Fourth Meridian...". As there are sixteen legal subdivisions in a quarter section, the twelve legal subdivisions presented above amount to three quarter sections.) Stoney Trail (Highway 216) runs through the eastern portion of the former village. Much of the former village is now located within Calgary's residential neighbourhoods of Applewood Park, Penbrooke Meadows and Red Carpet.

== See also ==
- List of former urban municipalities in Alberta
