= Albert Park, Alberta =

Albert Park
- Former village
- Location of Albert Park in Alberta
- Coordinates: 51.041°N 113.997°W
- Country: Canada
- Province: Alberta
- Census division: No. 6
- Municipality: City of Calgary
- Subdivided: August 4, 1908
- Incorporated (village): July 4, 1934
- Amalgamated: August 1, 1935

Government
  - Governing body: Calgary City Council
- Time zone: UTC-7 (MST)

Albert Park is a former village in Alberta, Canada that is now within the City of Calgary. Its village status ceased after just over a year upon amalgamating with nearby Forest Lawn to the east.

== History ==
Named for Albert Smyth who marketed the community along with a business partner, the subdivision plan to establish Albert Park was registered on August 4, 1908. The community was developed on land used for ranching and farming and it initially supported the surrounding agriculture industry. With slow lot sales in 1912 due to poor transportation connectivity, Smyth and the partner began placing railroad ties between Forest Lawn to the east and Calgary to the west, and initiated a rumour of a forthcoming streetcar connection to increase sales. The ploy was unsuccessful as it was exposed as a scam. Horse and buggy transit between Albert Park and Calgary was eventually established in 1921 to facilitate commuting.

After 26 years as an unincorporated community under the jurisdiction of the Municipal District (MD) of Shepard No. 220, Albert Park and nearby Forest Lawn each incorporated as villages on July 4, 1934 when they had estimated populations of 600 and 1,000 respectively. They amalgamated just over a year later on August 1, 1935, through the dissolution of the Village of Albert Park and the addition of its former lands within the Village of Forest Lawn. After another 26 years, the Town of Forest Lawn was annexed by the City of Calgary on December 30, 1961, along with parts of the MDs of Rocky View No. 44 and Foothills No. 31. Today, the former village is located within the Calgary neighbourhood of Albert Park/Radisson Heights.

== See also ==
- List of former urban municipalities in Alberta
