= FLHS =

FLHS may refer to one of the following high schools:

- Fair Lawn High School, Fair Lawn, New Jersey
- Fairfield Ludlowe High School, Fairfield, Connecticut
- Faith Lutheran High School, Crystal Lake, Illinois
- Faith Lutheran Middle School & High School, Las Vegas, Nevada
- Fort Lauderdale High School, Broward County, Florida
- Fort Lee High School, Fort Lee, New Jersey
- Forest Lake Area High School, Forest Lake, Minnesota
- Forest Lawn High School, Calgary, Alberta, Canada
- Fox Lane High School, Bedford, New York
- Francis Lewis High School, Fresh Meadows, New York City
- Fred Longworth High School, Tyldesley, Greater Manchester, England
