= Forest Lawn, Calgary =

Forest Lawn
- Neighbourhood
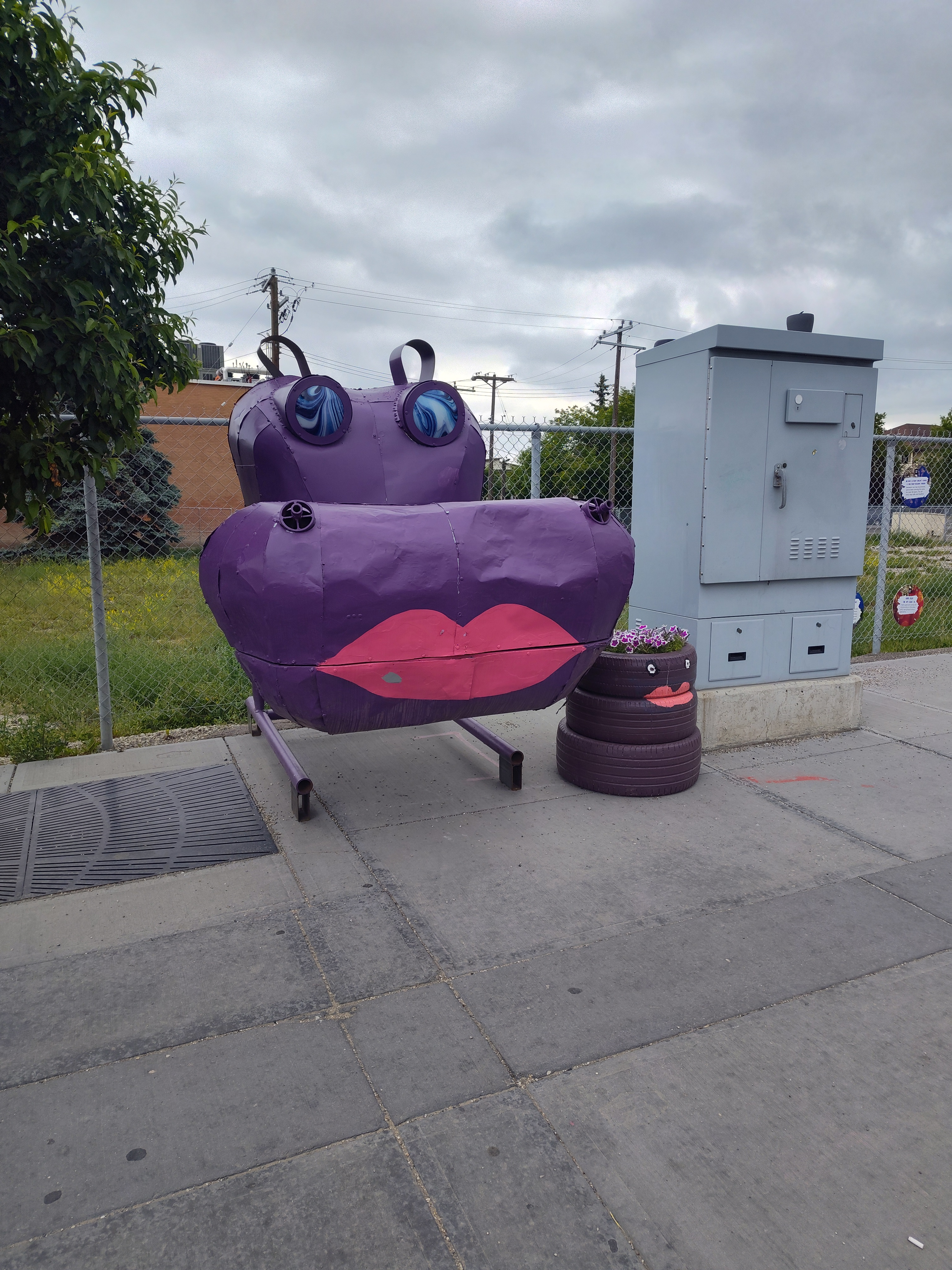
- Purple Hippo Statue of Forest Lawn

- Location of Forest Lawn in Calgary
- Coordinates: 51°02′28″N 113°58′12″W
- Country: Canada
- Province: Alberta
- City: Calgary
- Quadrant: SE
- Ward: 9
- Founded: 1910 (approximately)
- Incorporated (village) Amalgamated (Albert Park) Incorporated (town): July 4, 1934 August 1, 1935; 1952
- Annexed (by Calgary): December 30, 1961

Government
  - Mayor: Jeromy Farkas
  - Administrative body: Calgary City Council
  - Councillor: Andre Chabot (Communities First)

Area
  - Total: 2.26 km^{2} (0.87 sq mi)
- Elevation: 1,060 m (3,480 ft)

Population (2006)
  - Total: 7,857
  - Average Income: $40,396
- Time zone: UTC−06:00 (Alberta Time)
- Postal code span: T2A-T2B
- Website: Forest Lawn Community Association

Forest Lawn is a neighbourhood and former town in the southeast quadrant of the city of Calgary, Alberta, Canada. The neighbourhood is bound by 26 Avenue SE to the south, 36 Street SE to the west, 8 Avenue SE to the north and portions of 52 Street SE and 48 Street SE to the east. The former town comprises the entire current Forest Lawn neighbourhood as well as portions of Southview and Albert Park/Radisson Heights to the west, and portions of Penbrooke Meadows and Forest Lawn Industrial to the east. Both the neighbourhood and the former town are bisected by the multicultural 17 Avenue SE. Forest Lawn has an area redevelopment plan in place and is part of the International Avenue Business Revitalization Zone.

The community is represented in the Calgary City Council by the Ward 9 councillor. On a federal level, Forest Lawn falls in the electoral district of Calgary Forest Lawn and is currently represented in the House of Commons by MP Jasraj Hallan.

The community is a part of an group of communities known as the Greater Forest Lawn area, with the term coming from the former town of Forest Lawn which used to exist in the area prior to being annexed by the city of Calgary. Other communities in this area include Albert Park/Radisson Heights, Forest Heights, Southview, Penbrooke Meadows, Dover, and Red Carpet. This has often caused confusion among Calgary residents, with many people confusing nearby communities as being one-and-the-same as Forest Lawn. Additionally, some have included Applewood Park, Erin Woods, and Abbeydale as being a part of this area, however there are no official boundaries to this region.

Forest Lawn is not to be confused with the community of Forest Heights to the north. Google maps displays the two communities as a part of one larger community, but both are distinct identities from each other.

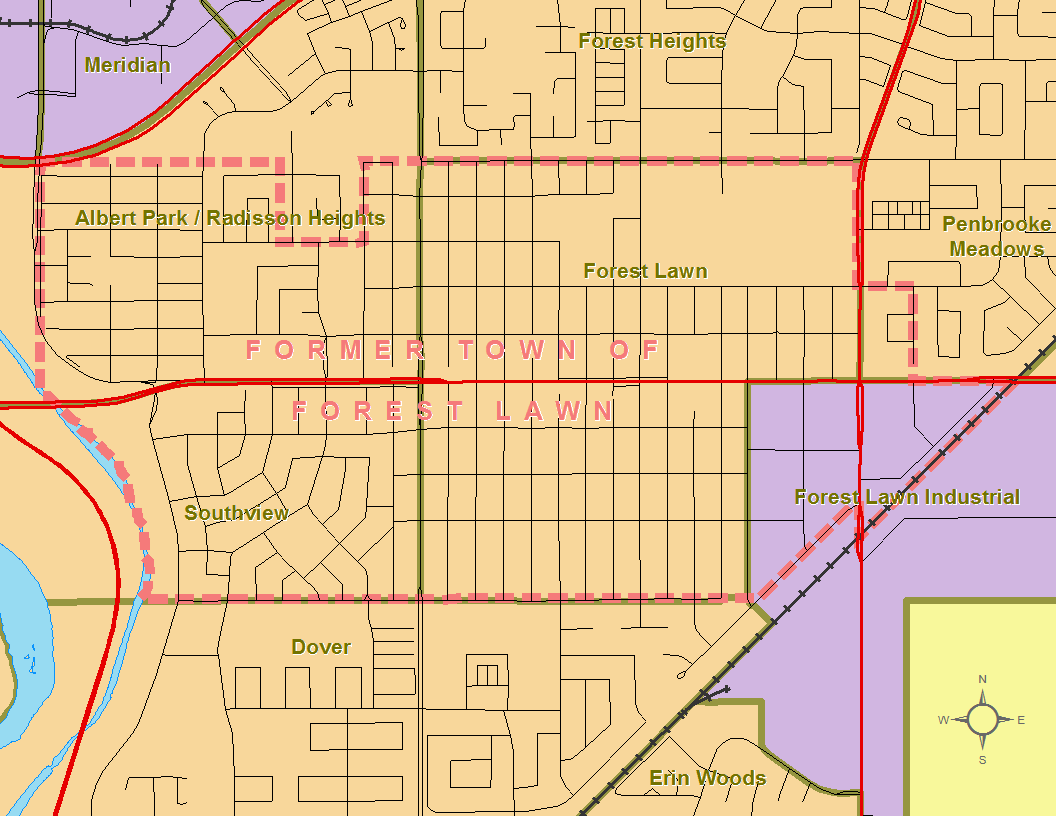
Boundaries of former town (circa 1960) and current neighbourhood

== History ==
The area was first settled in the early 1900s. Originally part of the Municipal District of Shepard No. 220, Forest Lawn and nearby Albert Park incorporated as villages on July 4, 1934. Forest Lawn and Albert Park amalgamated just over a year later on August 1, 1935, under the name of the Village of Forest Lawn. On December 29, 1952, Forest Lawn was incorporated as a town and pursued city status in 1958 although the application was never carried through. The town was subsequently annexed by the City of Calgary on December 30, 1961, along with parts of the municipal districts of Rocky View No. 44 and Foothills No. 31.

Pop. Overtime
Year	Population
2014	8,037
2015	8,179
2016	7,711
2017	7,772
2018	7,895
2019	7,814
2021	7,230

The southern part of Forest Lawn was originally its own neighborhood in the city of Calgary after Forest Lawn was annexed. Everything south of 17 Avenue SE and north of 26 Avenue SE was the neighborhood of Hubalta. Originally this land was proposed as the communities of Cleveland Park and Prospect Park in 1911, but would be developed at a later period due to the onset of the Great Depression.

== Demographics ==
In the City of Calgary's 2021 municipal census, Forest Lawn had a population of 7,230 living in 2,995 dwellings. With a land area of 2.3 km^{2} (0.89 sq mi), it had a population density of 3,140/km^{2} (8,140/sq mi) in 2021.

Residents in this community had a median household income of $58,000 in 2021, and there were 18% low income residents living in Forest Lawn. As of 2021, 31% of the residents were immigrants. A proportion of 29.4% of the buildings were condominiums or apartments, and 68% of the housing was used for renting.

== Crime ==
Forest Lawn is infamous in local Calgary culture as being a "bad area" of the city; and while the crime rate in Forest Lawn is below average, it is far from being one of the worst communities for crime in Calgary.

=== Crime Rate by Year ===
Crime Data
Year	Crime Rate
2018	7.1 /100
2019	7.3 /100
2020	5.8 /100
2021	7.1 /100
2022	8.1 /100
2023	5.9 /100

== Education ==
The community is served by Forest Lawn Senior High, Jack James Senior High, Ian Bazalgette Junior High, Ernest Morrow Junior High, Patrick Airlie Elementary, and Valley View Elementary public schools, as well as Holy Trinity Elementary, Father Lacombe Senior High, and Holy Cross Elementary/Junior High (Catholic).

== Forest Lawn Industrial ==
The neighbourhood of Forest Lawn Industrial is established south of International Avenue, and east of 48 St SE, between Elliston Park and 48 St SE.

In the City of Calgary's 2012 municipal census, Forest Lawn Industrial had a population of 130 living in 63 dwellings, an 8.3% increase from its 2011 population of 120. With a land area of 1.5 km^{2} (0.58 sq mi), it had a population density of 87/km^{2} (224/sq mi) in 2012.

In 2006 it had a median household income of $27,945 in 2000.

== Recreational ==
This area is served by two recreational pools. The Bob Bahan Aquatic and Fitness Centre, opened October 1974 and named after a community member of outstanding record, offers a number of registered and drop-in fitness classes, programs and lessons, both in the pool and on dry land. The Forest Lawn Outdoor Pool is operated by Benchmark Projects Ltd.

== See also ==
- List of former urban municipalities in Alberta
- List of neighbourhoods in Calgary
