= Airport Trail =

Road in Calgary

- 96 Avenue NE
- Maintained by: City of Calgary
- Length: 10.4 km (6.5 mi)
- Location: Calgary
- West end: Harvest Hills Boulevard
- Major junctions: Deerfoot Trail (Highway 2); Barlow Trail; Métis Trail
- East end: Stoney Trail (Highway 201)

Airport Trail and 96 Avenue NE is an arterial road and developing expressway in the northeast quadrant of Calgary, Alberta. It is an important east-west roadway and is the main access route to the Calgary International Airport.

== Route description ==
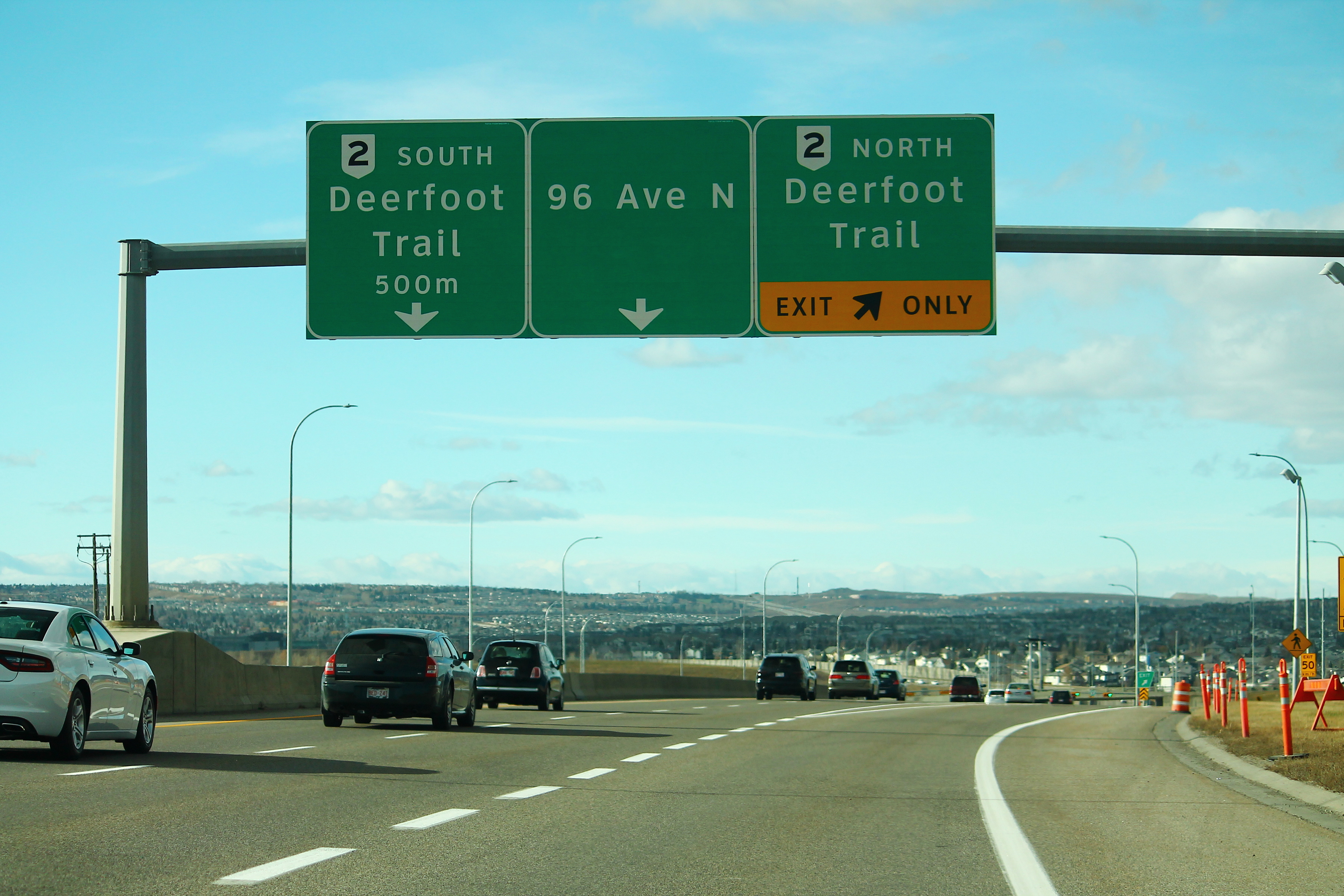
Airport Trail approaching Deerfoot Trail, where it continues as 96 Ave NE

The roadway begins as 96 Avenue NE at Harvest Hills Boulevard (the dividing line between the northeast and northwest quadrants) in the residential community of Harvest Hills; it is preceded by the short collector roadway of Country Hills Road, which provides access to the residential community of Country Hills. 96 Avenue NE travels east and crosses Nose Creek before reaching an interchange with Deerfoot Trail (Highway 2) and becomes Airport Trail. It continues east along the northern edge of the Calgary International Airport, which includes two accesses to the main terminal at 19 Street NE and Barlow Trail. It passes underneath a runway along a 650-metre (2,130 ft) tunnel, crosses Métis Trail, and passes through the residential neighbourhoods of Cityscape and Saddle Ridge, before ending at a partial interchange with Stoney Trail (Highway 201).

The City of Calgary is currently constructing interchanges at 19 Street NE and Barlow Trail, as well as expanding Airport Trail between 36 Street NE and 60 Street NE, with the project scheduled to be completed in 2022.

== History ==
The western portion of 96 Avenue NE was constructed in the late 1990s/early 2000s during the development of the Harvest Hills neighbourhood, ending at Harvest Hills Link. Prior to the construction of Airport Trail, the main access to the Calgary International Airport from Deerfoot Trail (and by extension, the downtown core) was by taking McKnight Boulevard and Barlow Trail along the southern and eastern perimeters, with a northern secondary route connection provided by Country Hills Boulevard. There was an increasing need for a more direct connection to Deerfoot Trail from the main terminal, as well as a recognition that part of Barlow Trail was located within airport lands and was subject to closure as part of proposed airport expansion plans. In 2001, the section of Airport Trail between Deerfoot Trail and Barlow Trail was opened, with it becoming the primary signed route to the terminal.

On April 3, 2011, the Calgary Airport Authority permanently closed Barlow Trail as part of the planned expansion and new runway construction. Although plans for a tunnel had existed for a while, a final deal between the City of Calgary and the Calgary Airport Authority wasn't reached until June 2011. The deal allowed for the tunnel to be constructed while the runway was also under construction, reducing the cost as opposed to tunneling under active runway. The agreement was also conditional that once Airport Trail was extended east to Métis Trail, interchanges would be constructed at 19 Street NE and Barlow Trail, so in the meantime Airport Trail ended at 36 Street NE. Construction commenced and the tunnel opened in May 2014 as a six-lane tunnel with provisions for a future LRT connection. The tunnel had a grand opening party on May 24 where the public could walk through the tunnel, and the event included live entertainment, a show and shine of classic and rare vehicles inside the tunnel, and speeches from dignitaries before the tunnel was opened traffic the following day.

In conjunction with the construction of the Airport Tunnel, 96 Avenue NE was extended east to Deerfoot Trail and linked with Airport Trail, which involved the construction of bridges over the Canadian Pacific Railway and Nose Creek. Construction began in 2011, but was halted in 2012 when inspectors found deficiencies in the bridge decks and missed the original targeted opening of September 2012. Remedial work was completed, and the road was opened in August 2013. As part of the project, the City of Calgary mandated 1% of the total cost of the capital project be put towards public art, resulting in the installation Travelling Light, a 17-metre (55 ft) tall blue sculptural ring integrated into the row of street lamps. Unofficially referred to as "The Big Blue Ring", it was installed in 2013 at a cost of $471,000. The artwork generated controversy for its high cost and simple design, with mayor Naheed Nenshi at the time referring to it as "awful" and a resident referring to it as a "huge hula-hoop with a streetlight stuck on its top."

== Future ==
The current interchanges being constructed at 19 Street and Barlow Trail are only another phase in a much larger freeway build out. Final plans include a cloverstack interchange at Deerfoot Trail with a westbound to southbound flyover. Farther east a new interchange between the 19 Street and Barlow Trail is also planned. This interchange will be large and freeflowing with multiple sets of flyovers that are planned to provide access to a short elevated freeway connecting to both the airport terminal, a service road and the parkades. To the east of the tunnel more interchanges are planned consisting of a partial cloverleaf at 36 Street, a full or partial cloverleaf at Metis Trail and a partial cloverleaf at 60th Street. The 60th Street interchange will also provide a crossing for an extension of the Blue Line LRT, this is also where the future Airport LRT will branch off from the Blue line to run on the median of the future freeway to the airport. No timeline has been set for the construction of any future phases and a lot of the plans are still being finalized.

== Major intersections ==
From west to east. The entire route is in Calgary.

km	mi	Destinations	Notes
−0.5	−0.31	Country Hills Drive	As Country Hills Road
0.0	0.0	Harvest Hills Boulevard	96 Avenue NE west end
2.4	1.5	Crosses Nose Creek	
2.5	1.6	Deerfoot Trail (Highway 2) to Highway 1 (TCH) – City Centre	Highway 2 exit 266; 96 Avenue NE east end, Airport Trail west end
4.0	2.5	19 Street NE	Eastbound exit and westbound entrance
4.8	3.0	Barlow Trail – Calgary International Airport	Interchange
5.3– 5.9	3.3– 3.7	Airport Tunnel	
6.2	3.9	36 Street NE	
7.0	4.3	Métis Trail	
8.6	5.3	60 Street NE	
10.4	6.5	Stoney Trail (Highway 201)	Highway 201 exit 70; no northbound entrance
1.000 mi = 1.609 km; 1.000 km = 0.621 mi: Incomplete access; Route transition; Unopened
