= 17 Avenue SE (Calgary) =

Road in Calgary, Alberta

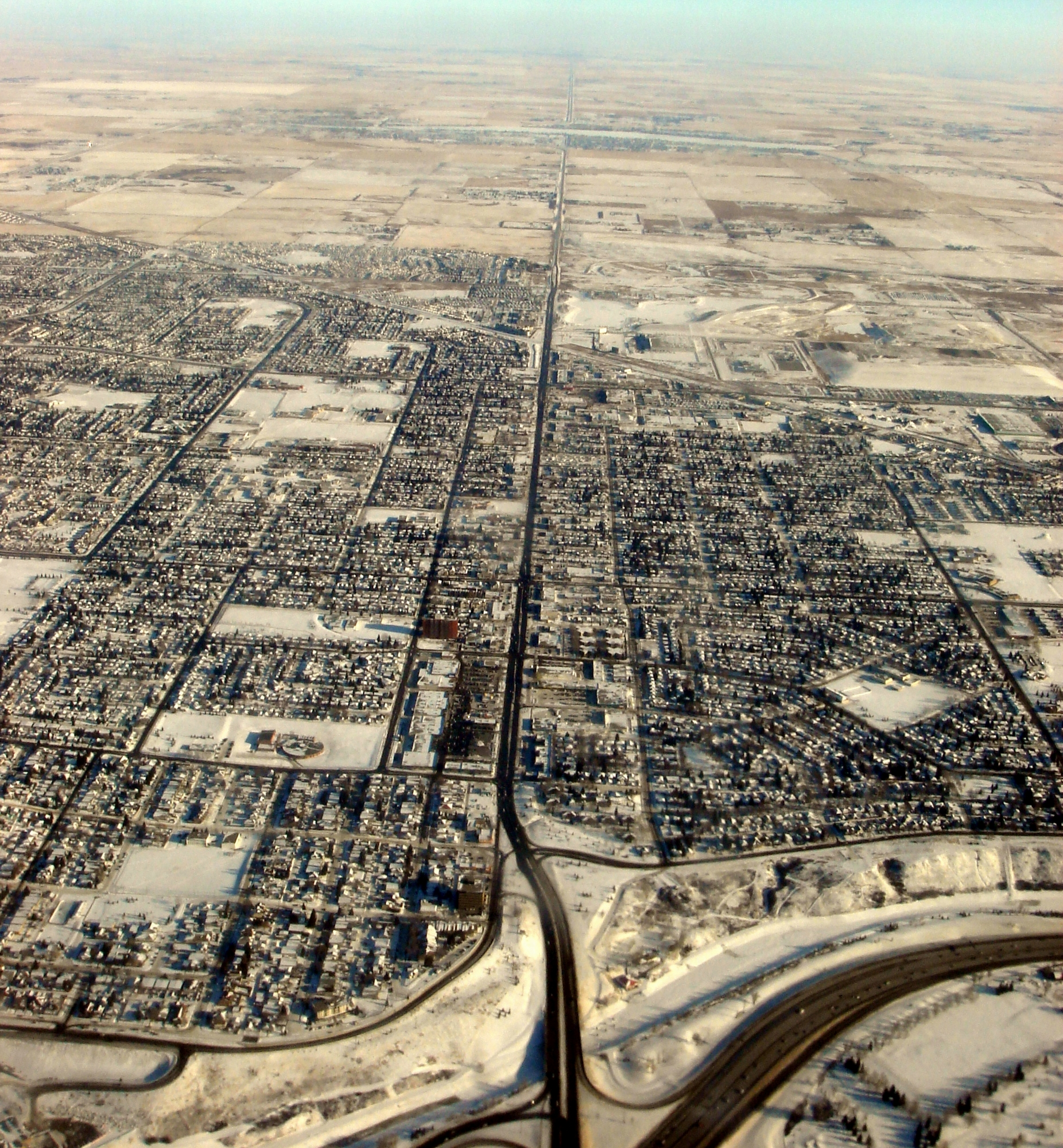
- Aerial view of 17 Avenue SE looking east
- Part of: Highway 1A (former)
- Length: 15.5 km (9.6 mi)
- 17 Avenue SE
- International Avenue
- Length: 11.2 km (7.0 mi)
- Location: Calgary, Alberta
- West end: 9 Avenue SE
- Major junctions: Blackfoot Trail; Deerfoot Trail (Highway 2); 36 Street SE; 52 Street SE; Stoney Trail (Highway 201)
- East end: 116 Street SE (Calgary-Chestermere city limits)
- Chestermere Boulevard
- Length: 3.8 km (2.4 mi)
- Location: Chestermere, Alberta
- West end: 116 Street SE (Calgary-Chestermere city limits)
- East end: Hwy 1 (TCH)

Neighborhoods
- Inglewood; Albert Park/Radisson Heights; Southview; Forest Lawn; Penbrooke Meadows; Forest Lawn Industrial; Red Carpet; Applewood Park; Westmere; Lakeside Greens; The Cove; East Lakeview Shores

17 Avenue SE is a major arterial road in east Calgary, Alberta. 17 Avenue SE is the focal point of the International Avenue Business Revitalization Zone (BRZ) and the main roadway through the former town of Forest Lawn. Chestermere Boulevard is a major arterial road and the eastern extension of 17 Avenue SE through Chestermere, Alberta, Canada. The roadway is a former alignment of Highway 1A.

== Route description ==
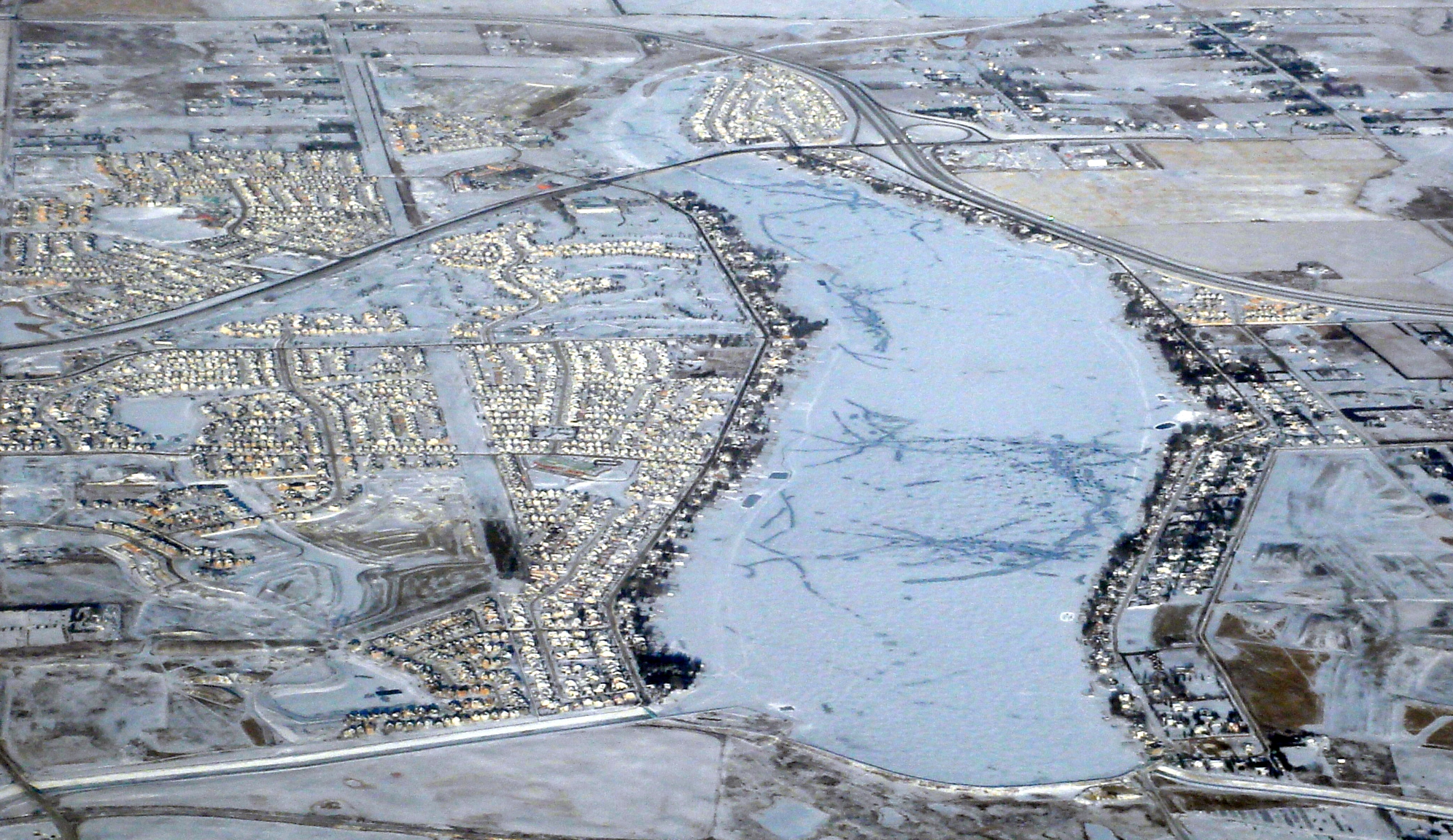
Aerial view of Chestermere Lake with the Chestermere Boulevard crossing and interchange with the Trans-Canada Highway.

The west end of 17 Avenue SE begins with a small segment at a 5-way intersection with 9 Avenue SE and 15 Street SE (due to traffic calming, access to northbound 15 Street SE is closed), crossing the Canadian Pacific Railway, and ending at 17A Street SE. It begins again just to the south at the Blackfoot Trail / 19 Street SE intersection and crosses the Bow River via the Cushing Bridge before intersecting Deerfoot Trail (Highway 2). Prior to the construction of Blackfoot Trail, 17 Avenue SE was a continuous roadway and the section between 19 Street SE and Deerfoot Trail is now generally referred to as part of Blackfoot Trail. 19 Street SE serves as the main access between 9 Avenue SE and Blackfoot Trail / 17 Avenue SE.

East of Deerfoot Trail, 17 Avenue SE leaves the Bow River valley and intersects Barlow Trail, though it is only accessible for westbound traffic. It passes through the communities of Albert Park/Radisson Heights, Southview, and Forest Lawn, and continues east past Elliston Park before intersecting Stoney Trail. It transitions into rural farmland and at 116 Street SE (also known as Range Road 284 or Conrich Road), enters into the city of Chestermere, where it becomes Chestermere Boulevard. It ends at the Highway 1 (Trans-Canada Highway) interchange, where it continues east as Range Road 243.

== History ==
17 Avenue SE is the original alignment of Highway 1 through eastern Calgary. In 1949, Highway 1 was rerouted to follow 16 Avenue N, bypassing downtown Calgary and Forest Lawn, and 17 Avenue SE designated as Highway 1A. The section of Highway 1A west of Deerfoot Trail was dropped in the 1970s, resulting in Highway 1A being a short alternate route into Calgary and its southeast industrial parks. In 1993, the International Avenue BRZ was established resulting in 17 Avenue SE being nicknamed as International Avenue. In 2007, the City of Calgary annexed land from Rocky View County up to Range Road 284 (now 116 Street SE); while in 2009, Chestermere annexed land up to the Calgary city limit, resulting in Highway 1A no longer travelling through a rural municipality and signaling a possible end to the Highway 1A designation. In 2013, the province of Alberta decommissioned Highway 1A, and as of 2016, remnant Highway 1A signage still remains on Deerfoot Trail and sections of 17 Avenue SE within Calgary; however, it has been removed along Stoney Trail, through Chestermere, and along the Trans-Canada Highway.

== 17 Avenue Transitway ==
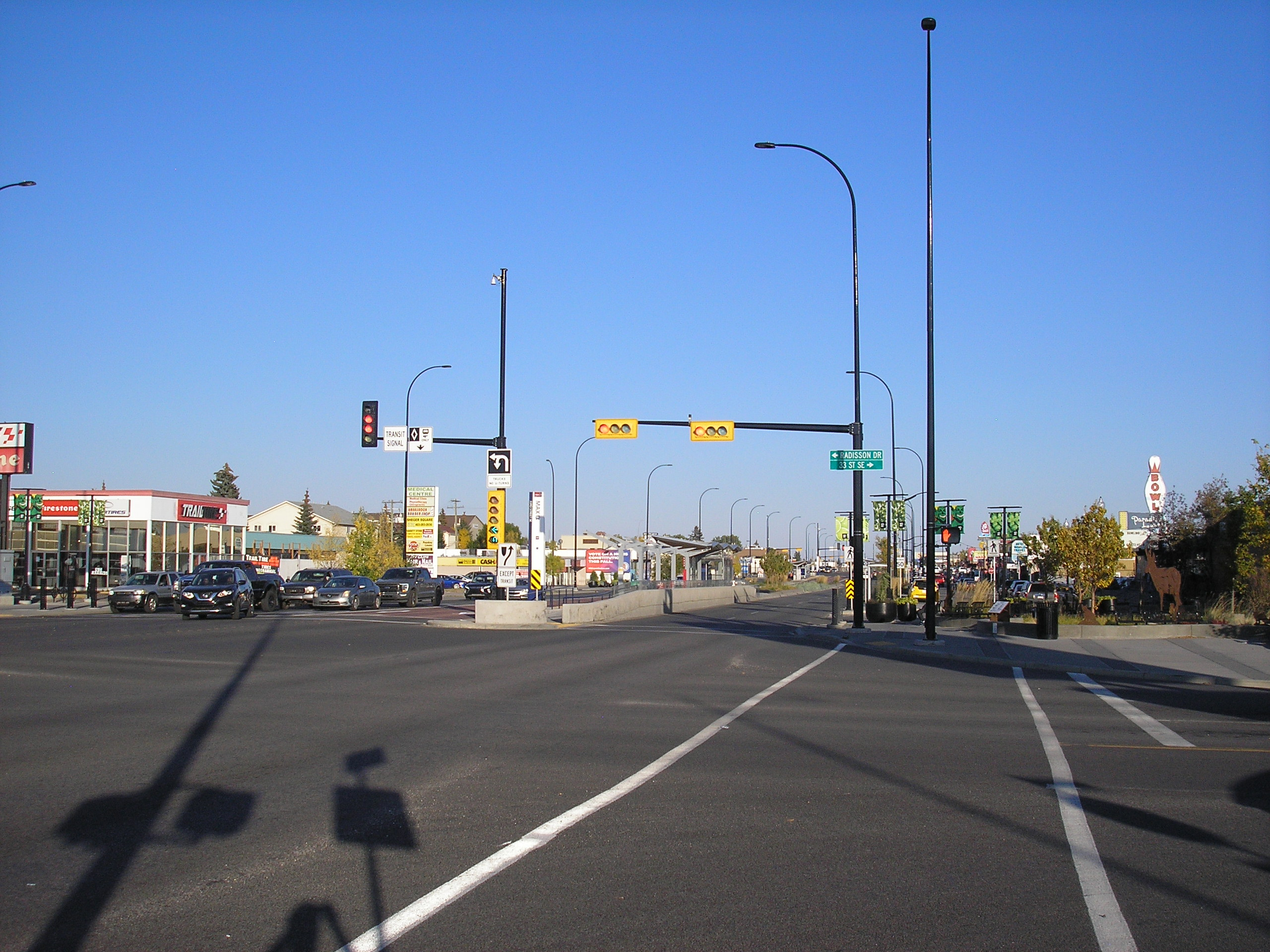
17 Ave Transitway at 33 St SE

The City of Calgary opened a 5-kilometre (3 mi) long dedicated bus-only transitway on November 19, 2018 as part of the city's MAX BRT network. The transitway, which carries MAX Purple, begins to the south of 17 Avenue SE at the intersection 9 Avenue SE and 16 Street SE, and travels parallel to Blackfoot Trail and 17 Avenue SE, crossing the Bow River and Deerfoot Trail on its own dedicated bridges. At 28 Street SE, the transitway shifts to the centre of 17 Avenue SE and travels east before ending just west of Hubalta Road. Long-term plans call for the mixed-use corridor and transitway to extend east into Chestermere.

Construction began in 2017 and was divided into two phases – both of which were constructed simultaneously. Phase 1 focused on the dedicated bus-only transitway on 17 Avenue SE between 28 Street SE and Hubalta Road SE, which included the construction of BRT station platforms and a complete transformation of International Avenue infrastructure. Phase 2 focused on the construction of a transit and pedestrian only bridge crossing Deerfoot Trail, connecting 28 Street SE to 9 Avenue SE.

== Major intersections ==
From west to east.

Location	km	mi	Destinations	Notes
Calgary	0.0	0.0	9 Avenue SE / 15 Street SE	
Calgary	0.5	0.31	Blackfoot Trail / 17A Street SE / 19 Street SE	Blackfoot Trail concurrency begins; through traffic follows Blackfoot Trail
Calgary	0.9	0.56	Cushing Bridge across the Bow River	
Calgary	1.5	0.93	Deerfoot Trail (Highway 2)	Partial cloverleaf interchange; Hwy 2 exit 254; Blackfoot Trail concurrency ends
Calgary	2.1	1.3	Barlow Trail / 26 Street SE	No eastbound exit to Barlow Trail
Calgary	2.2	1.4	28 Street SE	28 Street SE station (located south of 17 Ave SE)
Calgary	2.2	1.4	17 Avenue Transitway	Transitway enters median (continues west on the south side of 17 Ave SE)
Calgary	2.7	1.7	Radisson Drive / 33 Street SE	33 Street SE station (located in median)
Calgary	3.1	1.9	36 Street SE	36 Street SE station (located in median)
Calgary	3.9	2.4	44 Street SE	44 Street SE station (located in median)
Calgary	4.7	2.9	52 Street SE	52 Street SE station (located in median)
Calgary	5.1	3.2	17 Avenue Transitway	East end of transitway
Calgary	5.2	3.2	Hubalta Road	
Calgary	6.4	4.0	68 Street SE	Access to Elliston Park
Calgary	7.3	4.5	Stoney Trail (Highway 201)	Partial cloverleaf interchange; Hwy 201 exit 81
Calgary	7.9	4.9	84 Street SE south	
Calgary	8.2	5.1	84 Street SE north	
Calgary–Chestermere city line	11.2	7.0	116 Street SE / Range Road 284	East end of 17 Avenue SE • West end Chestermere Boulevard
Chestermere	12.8	8.0	Rainbow Road	
Chestermere	14.7	9.1	Windermere Drive / West Chestermere Drive	
Chestermere	15.0	9.3	Crosses Chestermere Lake	
Chestermere	15.3	9.5	Cove Drive / East Chestermere Drive	
Chestermere	15.5	9.6	Highway 1 (TCH) – Calgary (16 Avenue N), Medicine Hat	Partial cloverleaf interchange
Chestermere	15.5	9.6	Range Road 243	
1.000 mi = 1.609 km; 1.000 km = 0.621 mi: Concurrency terminus; HOV only; Incomplete access; Route transition

== See also ==
- Transportation in Calgary
