= MaKami College =

Post-secondary college in Alberta, Canada

MaKami College Inc
- Former names: MaKami College of Massage and Holistic Arts
- Type: Independent Academic Institution
- Established: 2001
- Founder: Marija Pavkovic Tovissi
- Officer in charge: Marija Pavkovic Tovissi
- Students: 2000+
- Location: Edmonton and Calgary, Alberta, Canada; 53.5397°N 113.4232°W (Edmonton location)
- Mascot: MaKami Max
- Website: makamicollege.com

MaKami College is a publicly-funded career college in Edmonton and Calgary, Alberta, Canada. It was incorporated in Edmonton in 2001 as a for-profit private career college, and was designated an independent academic institution in Alberta in 2023. The college became a not-for-profit educational institution in 2024.

== History ==
MaKami College was founded as a vocational school in Edmonton in 2001 by Marija Pavkovic Tovissi, specializing in massage therapy. The school originally struggled to find an insurer and created its own insurance company to solve this problem. It has expanded to include early childhood education, personal trainer, medical office assistant, health care aide, master instructor, business administration, security, and applied politics.

In 2013, MaKami College opened a second campus in Calgary. In 2019, MaKami College's Edmonton campus moved into the Bonnie Doon Shopping Centre, in a location formerly occupied by the department store Sears. In 2021, a second Calgary location opened in the Marlborough Mall, also in a former Sears space.

In March 2023, the school was granted Independent Academic Institution status by the government of Alberta. The Parkland Institute criticized this decision, citing program duplication, the inflated costs of MaKami's programs relative to similar programs, and that the decision could permit private for-profit postsecondary schools to receive public funding in the future.

== Programming ==
MaKami College has two campuses, located in Edmonton and Calgary.

The Edmonton campus offers programs in Massage Therapy, Early Childhood Education, Personal Training, Medical Office Assistant, Health Care Aide (HCA), Business Administration, Master Instructor, Security, Applied Politics and Continuing Education.

The Calgary campus has programs in Massage Therapy, Early Childhood Education, Personal Training, Medical Office Assistant, Health Care Aide (HCA), Business Administration, Master Instructor, Security, Applied Politics and Continuing Education.
