= Southview, Calgary =

Southview
- Neighbourhood
- Location of Southview in Calgary
- Coordinates: 51°02′01″N 113°59′17″W
- Country: Canada
- Province: Alberta
- City: Calgary
- Quadrant: SE
- Ward: 9
- Established: 1950

Government
  - Mayor: Jeromy Farkas
  - Administrative body: Calgary City Council
  - Councillor: Harrison Clark (Independent)
- Elevation: 1,060 m (3,480 ft)

Population (2006)
  - Total: 2,098
  - Average Income: $44,908
- Website: Southview Community Association

Southview is a residential neighbourhood in the southeast quadrant of Calgary, Alberta. It is bounded by 17 Avenue SE to the north, 36 Street SE to the east, 26 Avenue SE to the south and the Bow River to the west.

The community is a part of an group of communities known as the Greater Forest Lawn area, with the term coming from the former town of Forest Lawn which used to exist in the area prior to being annexed by the city of Calgary. Other communities in this area include Forest Lawn, Albert Park/Radisson Heights, Penbrooke Meadows, Dover, and Red Carpet.

Southview was established in 1950, being the last community to develop inside the Greater Forest Lawn Area and is part of the International Avenue Business Revitalization Zone. It is represented in the Calgary City Council by the Ward 9 councillor.

== Demographics ==
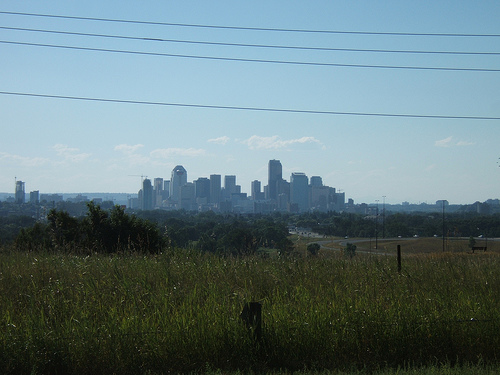
Downtown Calgary as seen from Southview

In the City of Calgary's 2012 municipal census, Southview had a population of 1,900 living in 936 dwellings, a -7.9% increase from its 2011 population of 2,063. With a land area of 1.6 km^{2} (0.62 sq mi), it had a population density of 1,190/km^{2} (3,080/sq mi) in 2012.

Residents in this community had a median household income of $44,908 in 2000, and there were 23.7% low income residents living in the neighbourhood. As of 2000, 14.9% of the residents were immigrants. A proportion of 18.5% of the buildings were condominiums or apartments, and 33.9% of the housing was used for renting.

Pop. Overtime
Year	Population
2014	1,815
2015	1,874
2016	1,845
2017	1,841
2018	1,858
2019	1,805
2021	1,550

== Crime ==
Southview has worse crime rates than its neighboring communities; however is not among the worst in the city for crime.

=== Crime data by year ===
Crime Data
Year	Crime Rate
2018	6.6 /100
2019	8.5 /100
2020	8.1 /100
2021	7.5 /100
2022	8.4 /100
2023	7.5 /100

== Education ==
The community is served by the Mountain View Elementary public school.

== See also ==
- List of neighbourhoods in Calgary
