= Chestermere Lake =

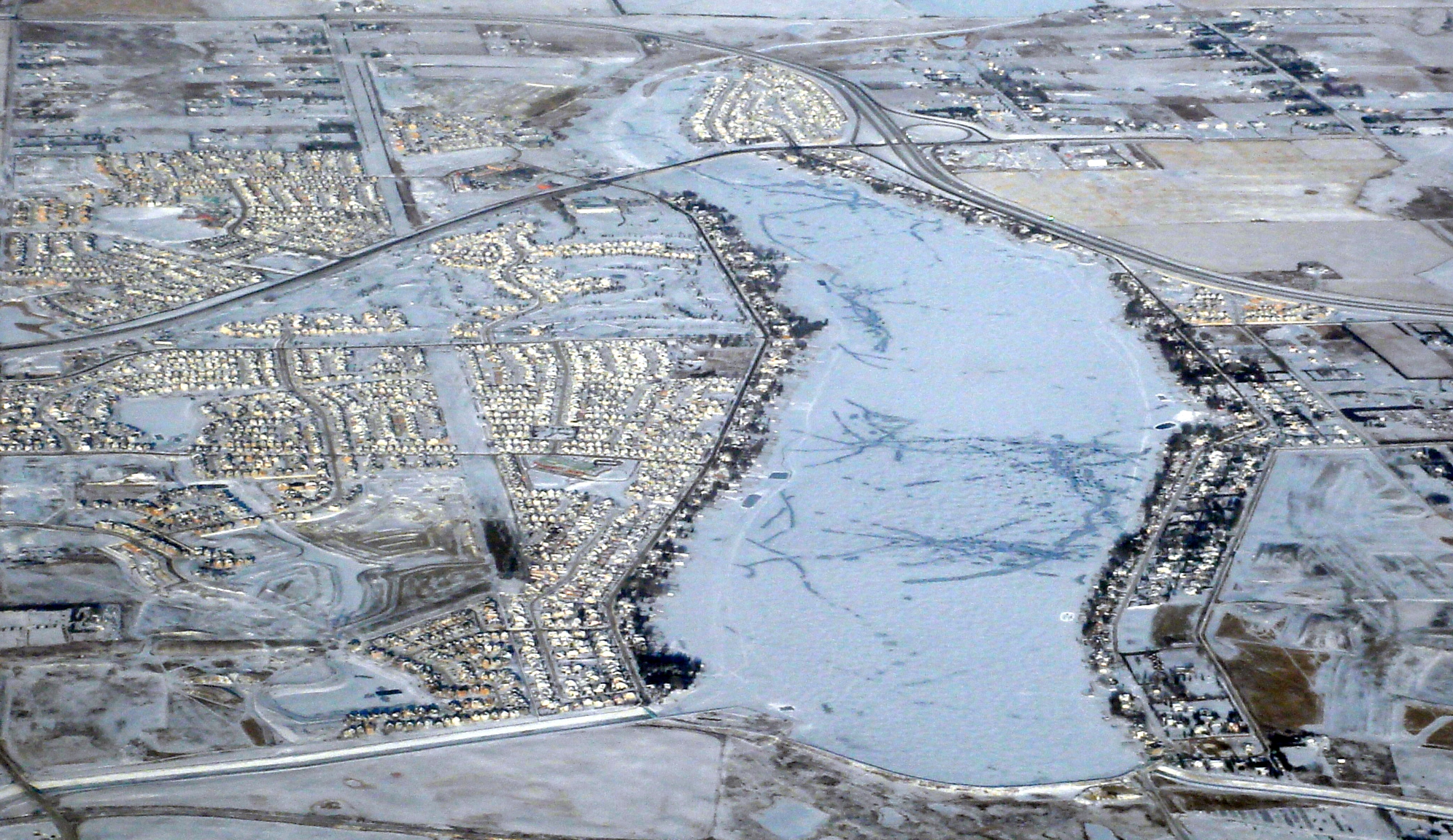
- in winter

- Location within Alberta
- Location: Chestermere, Alberta
- Coordinates: 51°02′20″N 113°49′07″W
- Type: reservoir
- Basin countries: Canada
- Max. length: 5 km (3.1 mi)
- Max. width: 0.7 km (0.43 mi)
- Surface area: 2.65 km^{2} (1.02 sq mi)
- Max. depth: 7 m (23 ft)
- Surface elevation: 1,028 m (3,373 ft)

Chestermere Lake is a man-made reservoir in Chestermere, Alberta, Canada.

It was built in the 1880s by the Canadian Pacific Railway, for irrigation of the area between Calgary and Strathmore. It is now used mainly for recreation purposes, such as swimming, windsurfing, fishing and skating (in winter). The City of Chestermere surrounds the lake on all sides. The Trans-Canada Highway follows the northeastern shore, while the railway tracks pass by the southern shore.

The lake covers a surface of 2.65 square kilometres (1.02 square miles) and has a maximum depth of 7 metres (23 feet). It drains into two irrigation canals and is filled via a canal from the Bow River along Radisson Heights.
