= Penbrooke Meadows, Calgary =

Penbrooke Meadows
- Neighbourhood
- Location of Penbrooke Meadows in Calgary
- Coordinates: 51°02′43″N 113°56′50″W
- Country: Canada
- Province: Alberta
- City: Calgary
- Quadrant: SE
- Ward: 9
- Established: 1969
- Annexed: 1961

Government
  - Mayor: Jeromy Farkas
  - Administrative body: Calgary City Council
  - Councillor: Harrison Clark (Independent)

Area
  - Total: 2.0 km^{2} (0.77 sq mi)
- Elevation: 1,057 m (3,468 ft)

Population (2006)
  - Total: 8,382
  - Average Income: $49,602
- Website: Penbrooke Meadows Community Association

Penbrooke Meadows is a residential neighbourhood in the southeast quadrant of Calgary, Alberta. It is bounded by Memorial Drive to the north, 68 Street E to the east, 52 Street E to the west and 17 Avenue SE to the south and is part of the International Avenue Business Revitalization Zone.

The community is a part of an group of communities known as the Greater Forest Lawn area, with the term coming from the former town of Forest Lawn which used to exist in the area prior to being annexed by the city of Calgary. Other communities in this area include Forest Lawn, Southview, Albert Park/Radisson Heights, Dover, and Red Carpet.

The area was annexed by Calgary in 1961 and Penbrooke Meadows was established in 1969. It is represented in the Calgary City Council by the Ward 9 councillor.

The postal code in this area is T2A.

== Demographics ==
In the City of Calgary's 2021 municipal census, Penbrooke Meadows had a population of 8,235 living in 3,005 dwellings,. With a land area of 2 km^{2} (0.77 sq mi), it had a population density of 4,100/km^{2} (10,700/sq mi) in 2021.

Residents in this community had a median household income of $73,000 in 2021, and 15% of Penbrooke Meadows residents were low-income. As of 2021, 38% of the residents were immigrants. A proportion of 3% of the buildings were condominiums or apartments, and 38% of the housing was used for renting.

Pop. Overtime
Year	Population
2014	8760
2015	8864
2016	8594
2017	8324
2018	8399
2019	8554
2021	8235

== Crime ==
Year	Crime Rate (/100 pop.)
2018	3.7
2019	3.3
2020	2.9
2021	2.9
2022	2.8
2023	2.8

== Education ==
The community is served by G.W. Skene Elementary, James Short Memorial Elementary and Penbrooke Meadows Elementary public schools, as well as by St. Peter Elementary School (Catholic).

== See also ==
- List of neighbourhoods in Calgary
