= Erin Woods, Calgary =

Erin Woods
- Interactive map of Erin Woods
- Coordinates: 51°01′13″N 113°58′23″W
- Country: Canada
- Province: Alberta
- City: Calgary
- Quadrant: SE
- Ward: 9
- Established: 1981
- Annexed: 1961

Government
  - Mayor: Jeromy Farkas
  - Administrative body: Calgary City Council
  - Councillor: Harrison Clark (Independent)

Area
  - Total: 1.59 km^{2} (0.61 sq mi)
- Elevation: 1,052 m (3,451 ft)

Population (2006)
  - Total: 6,994
  - Density: 4,398.7/km^{2} (11,393/sq mi)
  - Average Income: $56,123
- Website: Erin Woods Community Association

Erin Woods is a residential neighbourhood in the southeast quadrant of Calgary, Alberta. It is located at the eastern edge of the city and is bounded to the east by 52 Street E, to the south by Peigan Trail and to the north and west by the Canadian National Railway tracks.

The area was annexed by the City of Calgary in 1961, and Erin Woods was established in 1981. It is represented in the Calgary City Council by the Ward 9 councillor.

The postal code in this area is T2B.

== Demographics ==
In the City of Calgary's 2012 municipal census, Erin Woods had a population of 6,901 living in 2,453 dwellings, a 1.6% increase from its 2011 population of 6,794. With a land area of 1.6 km^{2} (0.62 sq mi), it had a population density of 4,310/km^{2} (11,200/sq mi) in 2012.

Residents in this community had a median household income of $56,123 in 2000, and there were 20.4% low income residents living in the neighbourhood. As of 2000, 20.3% of the residents were immigrants. A proportion of 0.5% of the buildings were condominiums or apartments, and 20.5% of the housing was used for renting.

Pop. Overtime
Year	Population
2014	7,146
2015	7,309
2016	7,034
2017	6,974
2018	6,850
2019	7,049
2021	6,790

== Crime ==
Crime Data
Year	Crime Rate (/100 pop.)
2018	2.2
2019	3.1
2020	2.4
2021	2.2
2022	2.4
2023	2.0

== Education ==
The community is served by Erin Woods Elementary public school.

After elementary school, most students tend to proceed to other schools within the neighboring communities of Forest Lawn and Dover.

== See also ==
- List of neighbourhoods in Calgary
