= Cityscape, Calgary =

Cityscape
- Neighbourhood
- Location of Cityscape in Calgary
- Coordinates: 51°08′49″N 113°57′29″W
- Country: Canada
- Province: Alberta
- City: Calgary
- Quadrant: NE
- Ward: 3

Government
  - Mayor: Jeromy Farkas
  - Administrative body: Calgary City Council
  - Councillor: Andrew Yule (Independent)
- Elevation: 1,094 m (3,589 ft)
- Time zone: UTC-7 (Mountain)
- Area code: 403 587

Cityscape is a residential neighbourhood in the northeast quadrant of Calgary, Alberta, Canada. It is bounded by Métis Trail to the west, Country Hills Boulevard to the north, the future 60 Street NE extension to the east, and the future Airport Trail NE (96 Avenue NE) extension to the south. Country Hills Boulevard becomes Highway 564 as it exits Calgary to the east. It was developed in 2013 (see https://calgaryherald.com/life/homes/condos/cityscape-2).

Cityscape is located within Calgary City Council's Ward 3.

== See also ==
- List of neighbourhoods in Calgary
