= Marlborough Mall =

Shopping mall in Calgary, Alberta, Canada

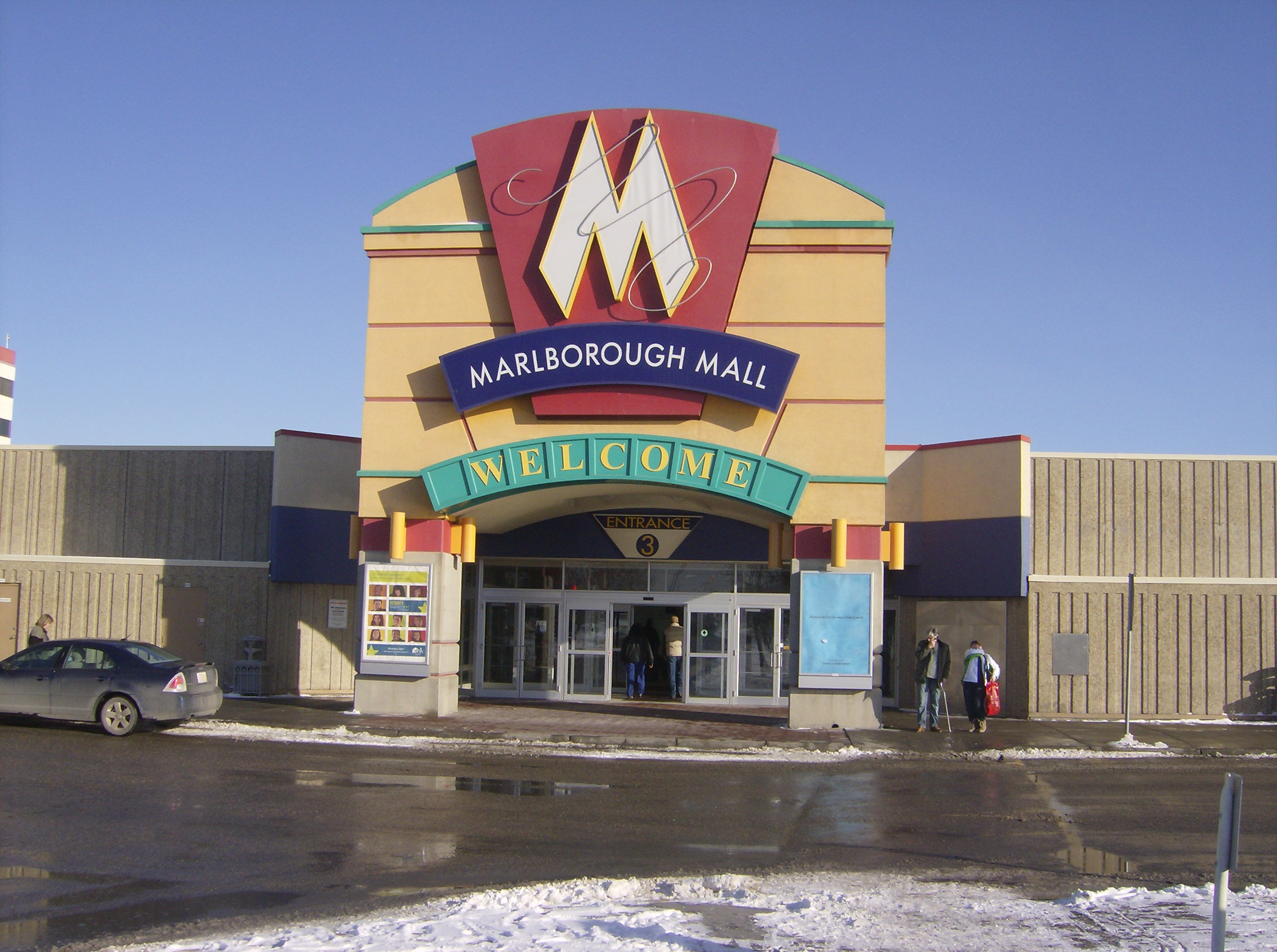
- A Marlborough Mall entrance
- Location: Calgary, Alberta, Canada
- Coordinates: 51°03′17″N 113°58′42″W
- Address: 3800 Memorial Drive NE
- Opened: November 1971
- Manager: Primaris
- Num. of stores: 107
- Num. of anchor tenants: 2 (1 open, 1 vacant)
- Floor area: 53,032.5 m^{2} (570,837 sq ft)
- Floors: 1
- Public transit: Marlborough station
- Website: marlboroughmall.com

Marlborough Mall is a shopping mall located in Calgary, Alberta, Canada. Opened in November 1971, the mall has expanded several times and today includes approximately 100 stores and services, and encompasses 570,837 square feet (53,032.5 m^{2}) of retail floor space. The mall also featured a Safeway until the 1990s, when the store moved to its own location west of 36th Street.

The current anchor store is Walmart, as Sears closed its doors in March 2017.

== Location ==
The mall is located in the northeast quadrant of the city, in the community of Marlborough next to the Marlborough C-Train Station. It is located at the corner of Memorial Drive and 36th Street.

Physically it shares the same block as the Applewood Village condominiums. The south and west ends of the mall are bound by 4-lane divided roads. The mall itself is located in a residential zone on the edges of the Franklin commercial area and is nearly surrounded by other commercial ventures. To the west lies a commercial park with a car dealership and several mini-malls and standalone retailers. One block to the northwest lies Pacific Place (formerly Franklin Mall) and directly west is a strip mall called Northgate. The larger, 2 level Sunridge Mall as well as a Real Canadian Superstore outlet is one C-Train stop to the north, about 2000 metres away, itself in a very large commercial setting with several blocks of stores concentrated together.

== Crime ==
On March 16, 2013, a video was recorded of an employee tackling an accused shop-lifter to the ground, striking them in the face. Multiple mall security were seen in the recording, not doing anything to resolve the situation. Crime experts have criticized the situation, stating that there was no reason from CTV footage to suspect shoplifting.

On October 13, 2013, a three year old boy was severely injured after someone attempted to run him over with their pickup-truck.

On June 20, 2014, a 45 year old man was attacked by a group of youth whilst leaving the mall. The man would later die from his injuries, being stabbed to death. Police say that the victim and assailants had no previous connections, and that the attack was randomly provoked.

On April 12, 2015, a vehicle would smash into the mall entrance during the early morning hours; with the two suspects leaving the vehicle to steal a large amount of merchandise from a jewelry store from the mall.

On September 17, 2016, police responded to reports of a person assaulting people with a weapon at the nearby Marlborough LRT Station. The suspect was found behind a dumpster at Marlborough Mall shortly after, in which a foot chase occurred, where the suspect was pursued through the mall. One of the officers pursuing the suspect through the mall would then get stabbed by the offender inside the mall; the officer would respond by discharging his firearm. Both the suspect and officer were transported from the mall to hospital, with one being in critical life-threatening condition.

On December 13, 2016, a couple were approached by two men in the Marlborough Mall parking lot, asking them for their time. When ignored, one of the men brandished a handgun whilst the other attempted to carjack their car. The robbery was successful and the suspects fled the scene via the stolen vehicle. This happened about an hour after another robbery happened at the Chinook Centre, in which it is believed that the same suspects were responsible for both incidents.

On November 8, 2018, an employee at a jewelry store at Marlborough Mall was left scared and shaken after being assaulted by a group of teens who were robbing the location.

On January 23, 2020, a man was stabbed and robbed in plain daylight whilst attempting to cross the street to enter the mall. The victim was transported to hospital in stable condition.

On May 18, 2020, the mall was evacuated and police were called after a bomb threat was made towards the mall near the Walmart. Police say nothing suspicious was found; the mall later reopened but most stores would decide not reopen for the day.

On June 20, 2020, a shooting would take place within the mall's parking lot, where two people were seen attempting to shoot at each other inside the parking lot; no one was injured and both suspects were seen walking away from the seen in opposite directions. Locals would comment saying that the event was unsurprising, and that it was "common for the area".

During the very early hours of December 7, 2020, a group of thieves were able gain access into the mall by prying open the mall entrances. From there, the thieves would go to Sparkle Jewellers and would steal an unknown amount of merchandise.

On June 27, 2021, a person was transported to hospital after becoming the victim of a shooting in the mall's parking lot, just outside of the Walmart.

== History ==
The mall was a joint development of Great West International Equities Ltd and Kowall Holdings Ltd, both Calgary firms. The original anchor tenants were Woolco and Canada Safeway. Construction began in 1971. A formal ground-turning event took place on June 19 of that year, with representatives of six community associations taking part. The mall was built quickly and Woolco had a grand opening event on November 24, 1971.

=== Marlborough Town Square expansion ===
Renovations in 1976 later expanded the mall northward and added Simpsons-Sears as an additional anchor tenant at the north end of the mall in the spring of 1977. The mall was rebranded as "Marlborough Town Square" and expanded from 30+ to over 100 retail tenants, including the 127,000 square foot Sears store and a 5-storey office tower to house professional services such as doctors, dentists and lawyers. The mall expanded from 25 to 60 acres with an additional 300,000 square feet of retail and office space, with parking for 3,500 vehicles.

A three-screen motion picture cinema was also included in the renovation. The facility cost $500,000 and was Calgary's second tri-plex. The three theatres were run by Canadian Theatres and could seat 760 viewers. The construction of the theatre was part of a boom in movie theatre construction in Calgary which saw a 64 percent rise in the number of screens in early 1977, from 28 to 46, part of an overall trend to smaller theatres intended to provide flexibility for movie-goers. Siting the theatre inside the mall also permitted ticket-buyers to line up indoors, a novelty for Calgary film-goers at the time and a bonus given Calgary's sometimes intemperate weather.

=== Triple Theatre ===
A multiplex theatre opened in the mall on February 18, 1977, showing first run motion pictures on three screens and many of the amenities included in the theatre were the first of their kind in Calgary, including the addition of wheelchair ramp and handicapped washrooms.

=== 21st Century renovations ===
In 2005 the mall underwent a total interior renovation that saw the addition of new tile, additional skylights, and a new mall corridor to access an expansion of Walmart that allowed the addition of several small retailers and the Simpsons-Sears renamed to Sears. Construction of a modest, 10,000 sq ft (930 m^{2}) expansion began in the summer of 2010 and involved the addition of a loading dock and space for three new retailers; construction was completed in December 2010. The parking lot has also been reduced from its 3,500+ vehicle capacity by the addition of stand-alone restaurant and fast-food retail spaces on the west side lot between 2014 and 2016. A new, net-zero BMO Bank Location expansion is expected to open in 2026.

== Tenants ==
On the day Marlborough Mall opened, four Woolco locations opened across Canada, bringing the total to 47. The Marlborough Woolco had a Red Grille restaurant and automotive centre.

A western Canadian toy chain known as Tops'n Toys had a store in the mall until the early 1990s, when US retailers like Walmart and Toys R Us began competing in the Canadian market. "These US giants bought their toys in volume directly from the manufacturers, and regularly sold certain toys at below cost to attract customers to the stores."

== Community ==
The expansion and rebranding of the mall in 1976 as Marlborough Town Square served as an opportunity for increased community engagement. A full-time promotional staff was hired to co-ordinate community use of the mall, which had grown to over 2,000 feet in length and the inclusion of seven promotional areas, including a performance stage with botanical backdrop in a landscaped outdoor plaza and open-air theatre.

In the past, Marlborough Mall has been an integral part of northeast Calgary's community life. Marlborough Town Square plans to put a greater emphasis on community participation, not only in the north-east, but city-wide. --The Calgary Albertan, October 13, 1976

The mall has served as a focal point for social events, hosting a small carnival midway in the west parking lot every summer in the 1970s and 1980s. The Ringling Bros. and Barnum & Bailey Circus has also operated from the west parking lot in the past. Other community activities have included geology displays by the University of Calgary, and booths to promote adult education.

The mall served as an impetus to have 36th Street upgraded, as a petition of businessmen cited the "unsafe" road as a reason residents weren't able to shop there. The road was widened in the mid-1970s and in the mid-1980s the public light rail transit system tracks were laid down the middle.

== Layout ==
The original mall in 1971 comprised 256,000 square feet, fully enclosed and air-conditioned. On expansion in 1976 the mall gained a split level, with the northern portion of the mall slightly higher than the southern. A standard 13-unit food court was located where the split occurred, with both an upper and lower deck for seating. A five-story "professional building" was also added and today houses medical offices including dental, general practice, and sports medicine.

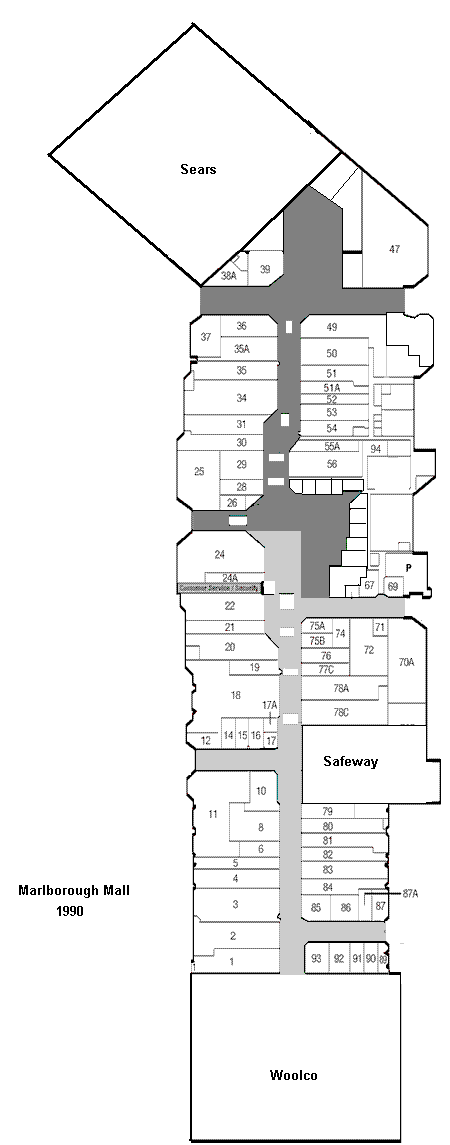

1990

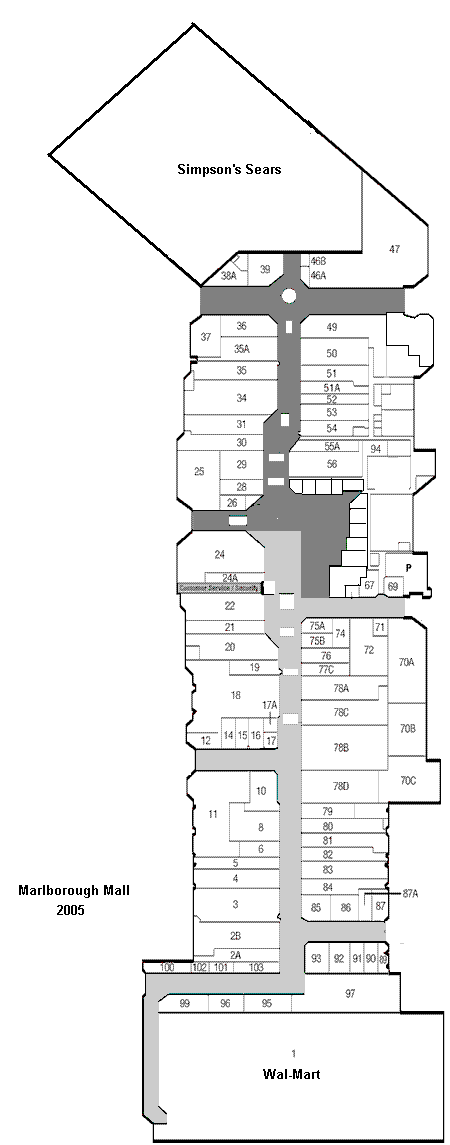

2005

== Anchors ==
- Walmart 14,827.3 square metres (159,600 sq ft)
- MaKami College 137,000 square metres (1,470,000 sq ft) (opened September 1, 2021)

=== Former anchors and tenants ===
- Sears (closed down on March 11, 2017 and was replaced by MaKami College)
- Woolco (closed in January 1994 and replaced by Walmart)
- SR Cash Remit
- Tutti Frutti Frozen Yogurt (closed down in March 2017 and got replaced by Go Go Kitchen)
- Go Go Kitchen (formerly Tutti Frutti, closed on July 18, 2023)
