= Applewood Park, Calgary =

Applewood
- Neighbourhood
- Location of Applewood in Calgary
- Coordinates: 51°02′41″N 113°55′42″W
- Country: Canada
- Province: Alberta
- City: Calgary
- Quadrant: SE
- Ward: 9
- Established: 1982

Government
  - Mayor: Jeromy Farkas
  - Administrative body: Calgary City Council
  - Councillor: Harrison Clark (Independent)

Area
  - Total: 1.3 km^{2} (0.50 sq mi)
- Elevation: 1,060 m (3,480 ft)

Population (2006)
  - Total: 5,628
  - Average Income: $65,724
- Website: Applewood Community Association

Applewood Park is a residential neighbourhood in the southeast quadrant of Calgary, Alberta. It is located at the eastern edge of the city, north of 17 Avenue SE. Elliston Park, the site of GlobalFest fireworks, is located southwest of the community.

Applewood was established in 1982 and is represented in the Calgary City Council by the Ward 9 councillor. The community has an area structure plan in place.

== Demographics ==
In the City of Calgary's 2012 municipal census, Applewood Park had a population of 6,498 living in 2,215 dwellings, a 1.5% increase from its 2011 population of 6,404. With a land area of 1.6 km^{2} (0.62 sq mi), it had a population density of 4,060/km^{2} (10,500/sq mi) in 2012.

Residents in this community had a median household income of $65,724 in 2000, and there were 14.8% low income residents living in the neighbourhood. As of 2000, 38.6% of the residents were immigrants. A proportion of 1.4% of the buildings were condominiums or apartments, and 11.4% of the housing was used for renting.

== Crime ==
Crime Data
Year	Crime Rate (/100 pop.)
2018	0.9
2019	1.2
2020	0.8
2021	0.6
2022	0.7
2023	0.6

== See also ==
- List of neighbourhoods in Calgary
