= Dover, Calgary =

Dover
- Neighbourhood
- Location of Dover in Calgary
- Coordinates: 51°01′10″N 113°59′29″W
- Country: Canada
- Province: Alberta
- City: Calgary
- Quadrant: SE
- Ward: 9
- Established: 1971
- Annexed: 1961

Government
  - Mayor: Jeromy Farkas
  - Administrative body: Calgary City Council
  - Councillor: Harrison Clark (Independent)
- Elevation: 1,050 m (3,440 ft)

Population (2006)
  - Total: 10,444
  - Average Income: $43,875
- Postal code: T2B
- Website: Community association

Dover is a residential neighbourhood in the southeast quadrant of Calgary, Alberta. It is bounded by 26 Avenue SE to the north, Peigan Trail to the south, 24 Street SE and Deerfoot Trail to the west and 36 Street SE to the east. The Inglewood golf course, developed in the Bow River valley, borders the community to the west.

The community is a part of an group of communities known as the Greater Forest Lawn area, with the term coming from the former town of Forest Lawn which used to exist in the area prior to being annexed by the city of Calgary. Other communities in this area include Forest Lawn, Southview, Penbrooke Meadows, Albert Park/Radisson Heights, and Red Carpet.

The area was annexed to the City of Calgary in 1961, and Dover was established in 1971. It is represented in the Calgary City Council by the Ward 9 councillor.

The postal code in this area is T2B.

== Demographics ==
In the City of Calgary's 2021 municipal census, Dover had a population of 10,795 living in 4,735 dwellings With a land area of 4.2 km^{2} (1.6 sq mi), it had a population density of 2,570/km^{2} (6,660/sq mi) in 2021.

Residents in this community had a median household income of $69,000 in 2021, and 14% of Dover residents were low-income. As of 2021, 25% of the residents were immigrants. A proportion of 29.4% of the buildings were condominiums or apartments, and 36% of the housing was used for renting. 27% of Dover residents spent 30%+ of their income on housing, compared to the Calgary average of 23%.

== Crime ==
In the May 2023-May 2024 data period, Dover had a crime rate of 2.575/100, an increase from the previous data period.

This puts it at this comparison to other Calgary communities: Saddle Ridge (1.358/100), Whitehorn (1.741/100), Rundle (2.342/100), Brentwood (2.348/100), Acadia (2.542/100), Dover (2.575/100), Bowness (2.934/100), Shawnessy (3.296/100), Inglewood (3.438/100), Sunnyside (3.650/100), Marlborough (4.703/100), Southwood (5.147/100), Sunalta (5.307/100), Montgomery (5.483/100), Forest Lawn (6.528/100), Rosscarrock (7.049/100), Downtown Commercial Core (12.705/100), Downtown East Village (15.605/100), Manchester (43.368/100).

=== Crime data by year ===
Crime Data
Year	Crime Rate
2018	3.5 /100
2019	3.4 /100
2020	3.0 /100
2021	3.2 /100
2022	3.8 /100
2023	2.8 /100

== Education ==
The community is served by Ian Bazalgette Junior High, Forest Lawn Senior High, Valley View Elementary and West Dover Elementary public schools as well as by Holy Cross Elementary & Junior High and Saint Damien Elementary (Catholic schools).

== See also ==
- List of neighbourhoods in Calgary
