= International Avenue, Calgary =

Coordinates: 51.0378°N 113.960°W

International Avenue
- Business Revitalization Zone
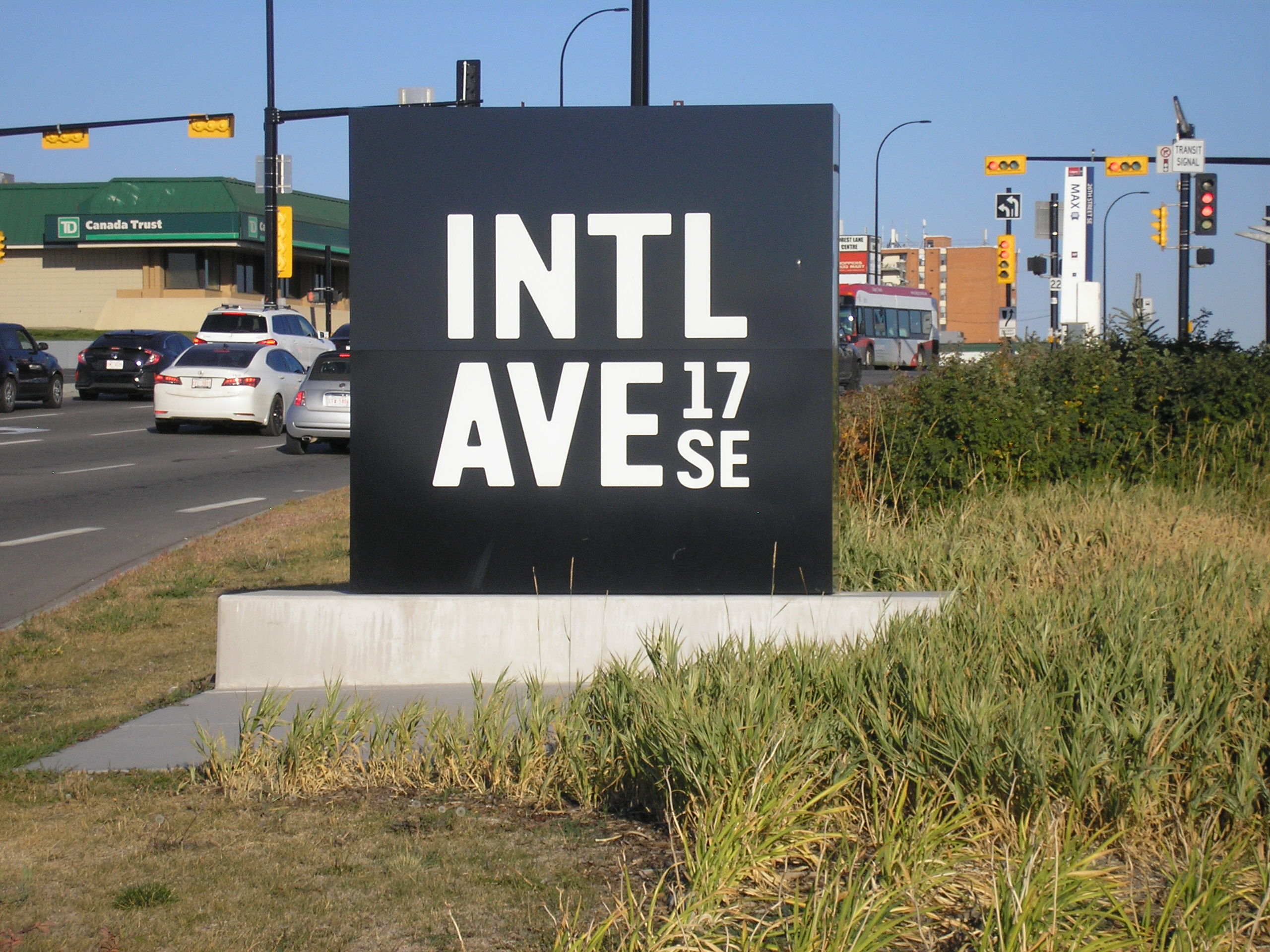
- A sign along International Avenue (17 Avenue SE).
- Interactive map of International Avenue
- Country: Canada
- Province: Alberta
- City: Calgary
- Quadrant: SE
- Founded: 1993
- Website: International Avenue BRZ

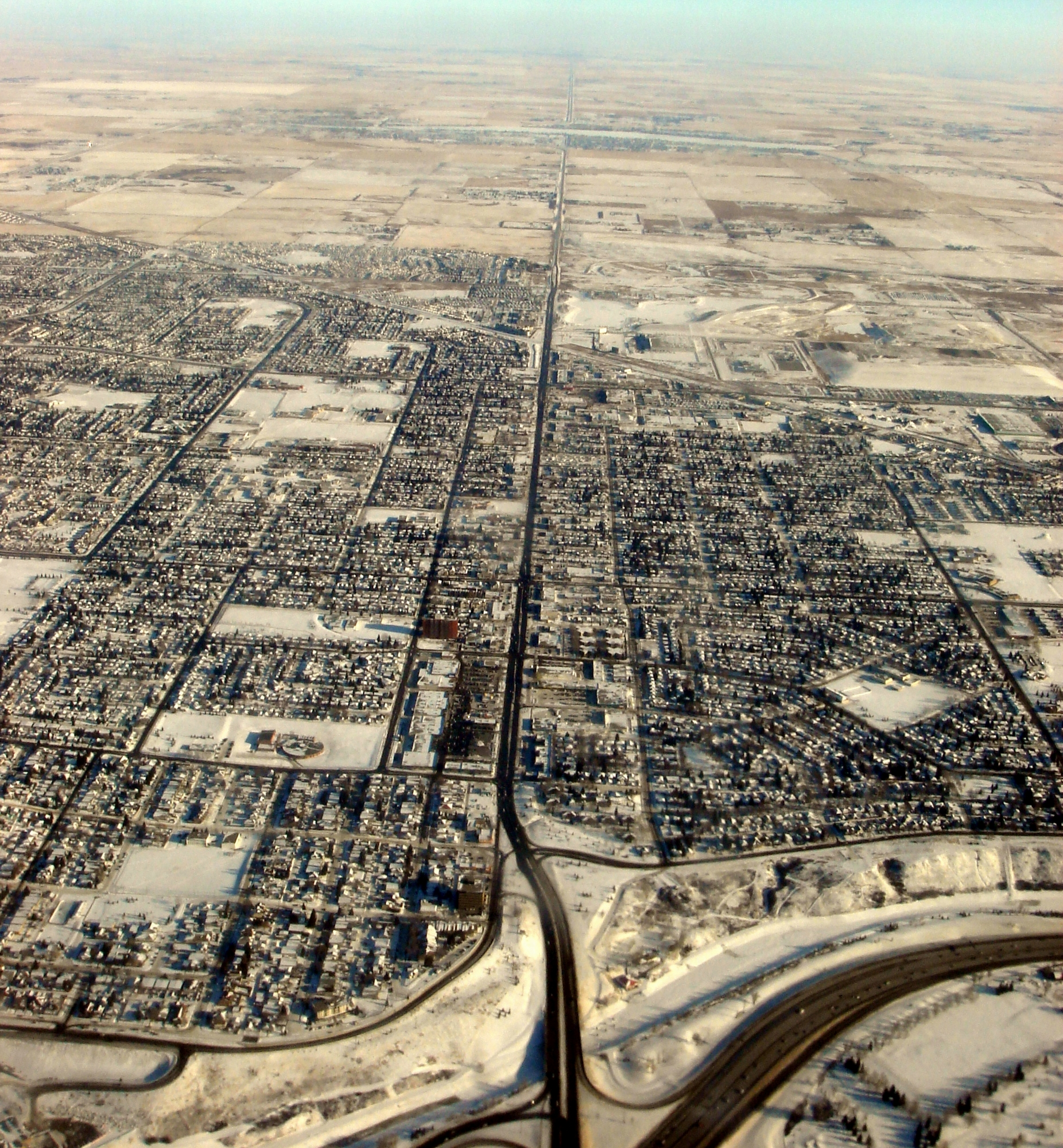
Aerial view of International Avenue (17 Avenue SE)

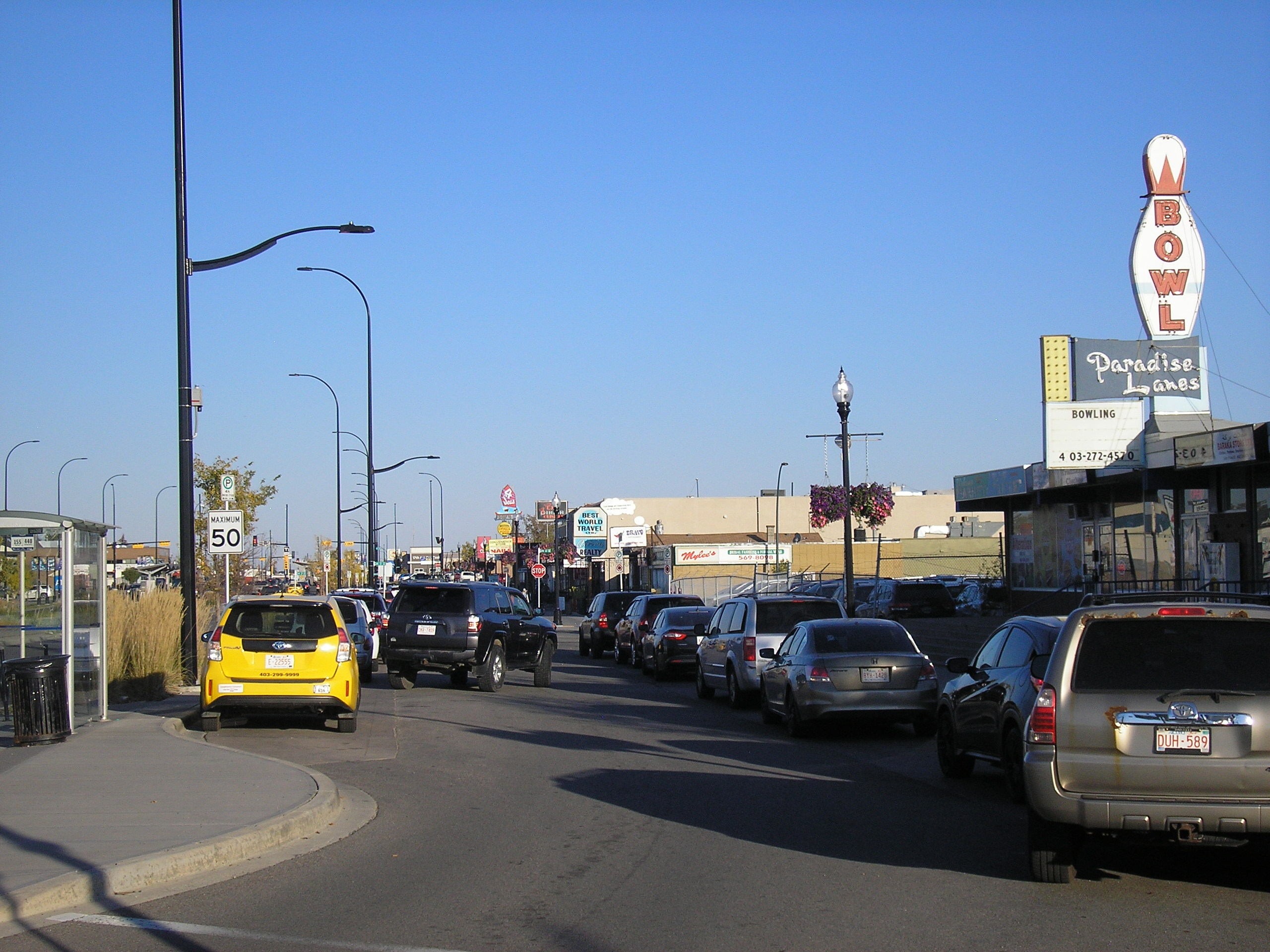
Businesses along International Avenue (17 Ave SE)

International Avenue is a Business Revitalization Zone (BRZ) in Calgary, Alberta. The district is centered on 17 Avenue SE in the neighbourhood of Forest Lawn in the east of the city. The district was created in 1993. The area has since become a popular location for ethnic restaurants and shopping.

The BRZ was also established to help revitalize the former town of Forest Lawn, which was annexed by the city in 1961. The neighbourhood has long had a reputation for being a haven for crime and drugs. In recent years, however, the area has been recognized for its multi-culturalism and has been slowly developing into a major destination for both Calgary residents and tourists. The city and the BRZ are currently in the process of implementing new urban design and redevelopment initiatives.

Since 2003, International Avenue has played host to Calgary's large multi-cultural event, GlobalFest. GlobalFest combines both a celebration of diversity known as OneWorld Festival and an International Fireworks Festival at Elliston Park. The event takes place annually in late August.
