= Albert Park/Radisson Heights =

- Neighbourhood
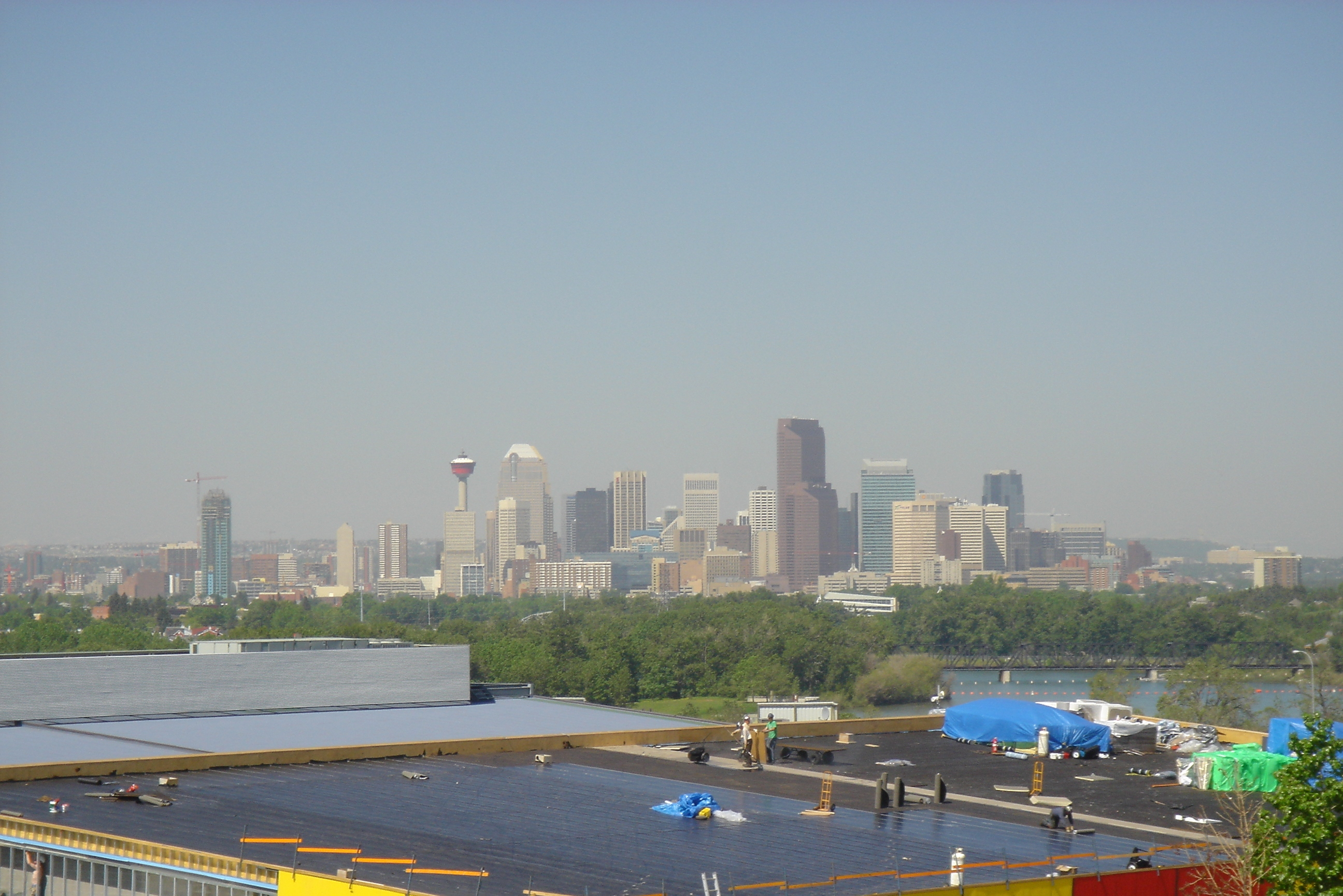
- Downtown skyline view from Radisson Heights

- Location of Albert Park/Radisson Heights in Calgary
- Coordinates: 51°02′44″N 113°59′22″W
- Country: Canada
- Province: Alberta
- City: Calgary
- Quadrant: SE
- Ward: 9
- Established: 1910

Government
  - Mayor: Jeromy Farkas
  - Administrative body: Calgary City Council
  - Councillor: Harrison Clark (Independent)

Area
  - Total: 1.7 km^{2} (0.66 sq mi)
- Elevation: 1,085 m (3,560 ft)

Population (2006)
  - Total: 6,098
  - Average Income: $38,019
- Website: Albert Park/Radisson Heights Community Association

Albert Park/Radisson Heights is a residential neighbourhood in the southeast quadrant of Calgary, Alberta. It is bounded to the west by the Bow River and Deerfoot Trail, to the north by Memorial Drive and to the south by 17 Avenue SE.

The community is part of a group of communities known as the Greater Forest Lawn area, with the term coming from the former town of Forest Lawn which used to exist in the area prior to being annexed by the city of Calgary. Other communities in this area include Forest Lawn, Southview, Penbrooke Meadows, Dover, and Red Carpet.

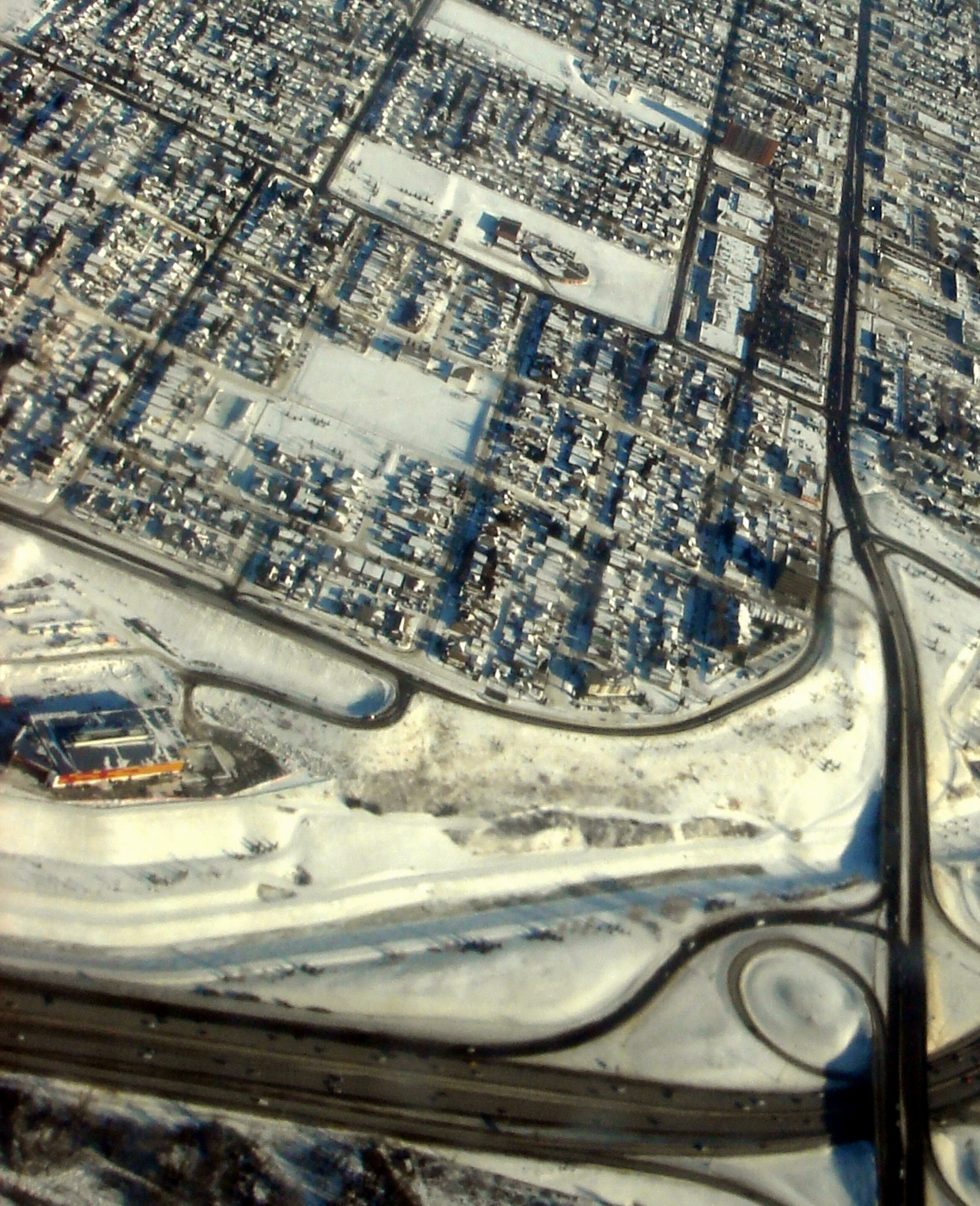
Aerial view of Albert Park in winter, with Max Bell Center

This community, established in 1910, enjoys ample open space, is well provided with public and separate schools, has good access to shopping and citywide transportation routes, and has views of the Bow River Valley, the Downtown and the Canadian Rockies.

The community has an area redevelopment plan in place and is part of the International Avenue Business Revitalization Zone.

It is represented in the Calgary City Council by the Ward 9 councillor.

== Demographics ==
In the City of Calgary's 2012 municipal census, Albert Park/Radisson Heights had a population of 6,234 living in 2,709 dwellings, a 0.3% increase from its 2011 population of 6,217. With a land area of 2.5 km^{2} (0.97 sq mi), it had a population density of 2,490/km^{2} (6,460/sq mi) in 2012.

Residents in this community had a median household income of $38,019 in 2000. As of 2000, 25.9% of the residents were immigrants. A proportion of 40.2% of the buildings were condominiums or apartments, and 58% of the housing was used for renting.

Pop. Overtime
Year	Population
2014	6,529
2015	6,611
2016	6,673
2017	6,745
2018	6,761
2019	6,997
2021	6,740

== Crime ==
Albert Park/Radisson Heights has historically been a troubled area of Calgary, but has had improving crime statistics in part due to public and private reinvestment in the greater Forest Lawn area.

Crime Data
Year	Crime Rate
2018	4.2 /100
2019	5.5 /100
2020	4.7 /100
2021	4.9 /100
2022	4.9 /100
2023	4.3 /100

== Attractions ==
Albert Park and Radisson Heights are close to Downtown Calgary. Inglewood, Fort Calgary Historic Park and the Wilder Institute/Calgary Zoo, are just moments away. The Max Bell Centre (ice hockey arena) is located immediately west of Radisson Heights.

== Education ==
This neighbourhood has one public elementary school: Radisson Park Elementary School (K-5) built in 2006. There were two other elementary schools that were closed and merged into Radisson Park Elementary School, angering some southwest residents who have no community elementary schools.
