= GlobalFest =

Annual festival in Calgary, Alberta

GlobalFest Calgary
- Several colourful bursts at the 2003 GlobalFest fireworks competition.
- Genre: Cultural festival, fireworks
- Dates: August
- Location: Calgary
- Founded: 2003
- Website: GlobalFest

GlobalFest is an annual cultural and fireworks festival in Calgary, Alberta, Canada.

The festival has been held every August since 2003 (except 2020, when it was cancelled), and is organized by The Calgary Fireworks Festival Society.

GlobalFest consists of different components: the OneWorld Festival (with Cultural Pavilions, ethnic food kiosks, and a vendor Night Market) the International Fireworks Festival (with up to 6 fireworks presentations from up to 5 international teams), and Alberta's largest drone show.

In 2026, GlobalFest moved from the Elliston Park location to Spruce Meadows citing space, accessibility, and parking constraints being some of the reasons behind the move.

== Human Rights Forum ==
The GlobalFest Human Rights Forum presented by TD Bank Financial Group is a Calgary-based, week-long event that invites various speakers, guests, and experts to discuss pertinent issues relating to human rights and diversity. The Human Rights Forum seeks to build community dialogue by addressing various topics of racism and discrimination.

Informed by the aims of the United Nations Educational, Scientific and Cultural Organization (UNESCO) and its International Coalition of Cities Against Racism Initiative, the Human Rights Forum aims to highlight the Canadian Coalition of Municipalities Against Racism and Discrimination's (CCMARD) ten common commitments.

The 2010 Human Rights Forum took place from May 3 to 7 at the John Dutton Theatre within the Calgary Central Public Library.

The theme topic for the 2010 Human Rights Forum focused on Youth addressing the following commitments:

- Increase vigilance against systemic and individual racism and discrimination.
- Support policing services in their efforts to be exemplary institutions in combating racism and discrimination.
- Inform and support individuals who experience racism and discrimination.
- Support measures to challenge racism and discrimination and promote diversity and equal opportunity in the education sector and in other forms of learning.
- Promote respect, understanding and appreciation of cultural diversity and the inclusion of Aboriginal and racialized communities into the cultural fabric of the municipality.

== Youth Forum ==
The Human Rights Forum extended its programming in 2010 to include the GlobalFest Youth Forum, an additional program that includes youth directly. The 2010 GlobalFest Youth Forum featured UNITY Charity Presenting their "Hip Hop Away From Violence" program to five high schools in Calgary from April 26 to 30.

UNITY Charity is a youth led and artist driven anti-violence group from Toronto that specializes in urban performance assemblies and artistic workshops. UNITY seeks to provide positive artistic outlets for youth to express themselves instead of expressing themselves through violence, drug use, stereotyping, bullying and other negative forms of self-expression.

== Fireworks Festival ==
The International Fireworks Festival was held at Elliston Park in Southeast Calgary from 2003 through 2025 and was presented by Trico Homes. Beginning with the 2026 event, GlobalFest is scheduled to take place at Spruce Meadows. Each night of the festival showcases a different nation. Pyrotechnic displays take place over the venue and are synchronized to music. Thus, these choreographed pyrotechnical arrangements are referred to as 'pyro-musicals'.

In 2009 the organizers introduced a variety of artistic requirements that all fireworks designers must incorporate into their designs. In past years the fireworks were presented in the style of a competition with a competitor being limited to winning two years in a row before a mandatory year-long break would be implemented. As of 2009, the pyro-musical presentations have been presented in a festival process rather than as a competition. This new process has been introduced to better meet artistic and funding criteria set forward by various backing partners as well as to help better fulfill GlobalFest's mandate of promoting cultural diversity.

Over the years several countries have participated in the pyro-musical aspect of GlobalFest: Canada, USA, Mexico, India, South Africa, Germany, Portugal, Hong Kong, China, Spain, Italy and Japan.

New artistic requirements included a compulsory piece of music that must be incorporated by each competitor and a 25% minimum of each competitor's music that must be native to the representing country. This was done to challenge the designers, provide a better pyro-musical experience to the audience, and better meet the mandate of GlobalFest as a Multi-Cultural Festival. From 2012 to 2017, the compulsory piece was composed by local, Calgarian composer Donovan Seidle.

Globalfest 2012 featured countries:

- Philippines
- Mexico
- China
- Brazil
- (United States) USA

GlobalFest 2013 featured countries:

- August 16, 2013 - China (Returning Nation)
- August 18, 2013 - France
- August 20, 2013 - (United Kingdom) Great Britain
- August 22, 2013 - (United States) USA (Returning Nation)
- August 25, 2013 - Grand Finale - GlobalFest (Canada, Sirius Pyrotechnics)

GlobalFest 2014 featured countries:

- Japan
- Thailand
- Vietnam
- France
- Grand Finale - GlobalFest (Canada, Sirius Pyrotechnics)

GlobalFest 2015 featured countries:

- August 20, 2015 - China
- August 22, 2015 - Philippines
- August 25, 2015 - Spain
- August 27, 2015 - Vietnam
- August 29, 2015 - Grand Finale - GlobalFest (Canada, Sirius Pyrotechnics)

GlobalFest 2016 featured countries:

- August 18, 2016 - Brazil
- August 20, 2016 - Chile
- August 23, 2016 - Mexico
- August 25, 2016 - (United States) USA
- August 27, 2016 - Grand Finale - GlobalFest (Canada, Sirius Pyrotechnics)

GlobalFest 2017 featured PROVINCES (Canada 150 Celebration):

- August 15, 2017 - The West - Mystical Fireworks, designed by Luis Brunchu
- August 17, 2017 - Prairies - Big Bang Fireworks, designed by Dan Roy
- August 19, 2017 - Ontario - Firemaster Productions, designed by Sean Morris
- August 22, 2017 - Quebec - Feu Orion, designed by Patrick Chandonnet
- August 24, 2017 - Atlantic - Fireworks FX, designed by George Wade
- August 26, 2017 - Grand Finale - GlobalFest (Canada, Sirius Pyrotechnics), designed by Patrick Brault

Globalfest 2018 featured countries:

- August 16, 2018 - Ukraine Dance of Fire
- August 18, 2018 - Spain Pirotecnia Zaragozana, designed by Miguel Perez
- August 21, 2018 - Philippines, Leegendary Fireworks
- August 23, 2018 - China
- August 25, 2018 - Grand Finale - GlobalFest (Canada, Sirius Pyrotechnics), designed by Patrick Brault

Globalfest 2019 featured countries:

- August 15, 2019 - (United States) USA - Pyro Spectaculars by Souza
- August 17, 2019 - Spain - Pirotecnia Zaragozana
- August 20, 2019 - China - Liuyang Jintan Fireworks
- August 22, 2019 - Canada - Archangel Fireworks Inc.
- August 24, 2019 - Grand Finale - GlobalFest Canada (Canada, Sirius Pyrotechnics)

Competition winners:

- 2012 - (United States) USA, Pyrotecnico, Inc., Designed by Rocco Vitale (Best of Show - Top Prize); Brazil, Vision Show Ltd, Designed by Marcelo de Kokote Andrade (People's Choice)
- 2013 - France, FC Pyro (Best of Show - Top Prize); (United States) USA, Pyrotecnico (People's Choice)
- 2014 - Vietnam, Danang Fireworks Team (Best of Show - Top Prize); Thailand, Thailand Fireworks (People's Choice)
- 2015 - Philippines, Platinum Fireworks, Designed by Joel Sta (Best of Show - Top Prize);
- 2016 - (United States) USA (Best of Show - Top Prize); Brazil (People's Choice)
- 2017 - Ontario, Firemaster Productions (Best of Show - Top Prize); Western Canada, Mystical Fireworks (People's Choice)
- 2018 - Spain, Pirotecnia Zaragozana (Best of Show - Top Prize)
- 2019 - Spain, Pirotecnia Zaragozana (Best of Show - Top Prize); Canada, Archangel Fireworks Inc. (People's Choice)

== OneWorld Festival ==
In the early years, GlobalFest featured cultural pavilions scattered throughout Calgary, usually in various community halls. The pavilions would often include ethnic food, displays and entertainment. Cultural Pavilions included themes from Africa, Hispanic America, Middle East, Caribbean, Francophone, India, Italy, Mexico, Scotland, Ukraine and Vietnam. The OneWorld festival was originally co-organized with the International Avenue Arts and Culture Centre.

In 2007, the pavilions were grouped together for the first time at Penbrooke Meadows Community Association and was visited by over 10,000 GlobalFest patrons.

In 2008, a previously protected area of Elliston Park was opened up to the organizers and the move was made to transfer the cultural pavilions to Elliston Park and re-launch the OneWorld Village. The cultural organizations are also provided the opportunity to present their nations' foods in separate food kiosks, located adjacent to the OneWorld Village.

GlobalFest patrons can now enjoy the OneWorld Festival in conjunction with the International Fireworks Festival each evening at the same location in Elliston Park. Cultural stages will feature music, dance and other artists presented by the cultural pavilion organizers within the OneWorld Village. The Calgary Foundation Centennial stage will also be presenting various artists to those patrons on the south side of Elliston Park. A third stage has been added to the site located in the OneWorld Cafe and International Bar. The Cafe stage will provide entertainment nightly prior to the fireworks as well as for an hour following the fireworks presentation.

== History ==
The idea for the festival started in 1994, when the newly established Calgary Fireworks Festival Society started looking for a safe firework launch site. It took until 2001 to discover Elliston Park and its lake. At the same time, the International Avenue Arts and Culture Centre was making plans for a multicultural festival in Forest Lawn. The two non-profit societies presented plans for a joint festival at Calgary's International Avenue Business Revitalisation Zone (a city department), and the festival began in 2003, with an audience of almost 100,000, including city residents and tourists.

The site chosen for the fireworks display, Elliston Lake, is the second largest lake in Calgary (after Glenmore Reservoir), and was created close to a landfill site in 1978. The land has been owned by the city of Calgary since 1960 The area was used for agriculture for ten years, and Elliston Park opened in 1994. Over the years the park has been expanded by reclaiming land from the nearby landfill, bringing the total area to over 410 hectares, making it the city's second largest park (after Nose Hill).

With 2020 going on hiatus caused by the COVID-19 pandemic, it'll return in 2021.

== See also ==
- List of festivals in Calgary
- Festivals in Alberta
