= Red Carpet, Calgary =

Red Carpet
- Neighbourhood
- Location of Red Carpet in Calgary
- Coordinates: 51°02′26″N 113°56′22″W
- Country: Canada
- Province: Alberta
- City: Calgary
- Quadrant: SE
- Ward: 9
- Established: 1969

Government
  - Mayor: Jeromy Farkas
  - Administrative body: Calgary City Council
  - Councillor: Harrison Clark (Independent)

Area
  - Total: 0.5 km^{2} (0.19 sq mi)
- Elevation: 1,055 m (3,461 ft)

Population (2006)
  - Total: 1,765
  - Average Income: $37,565
- Website: Red Carpet Community Association

Red Carpet is a community in the southeast quadrant of Calgary, Alberta. It is located at the eastern edge of the city, between the CN tracks, 17 Avenue SE and 68 Street SE. Elliston Park and Elliston Lake, the site of GlobalFest fireworks, are located immediately south of the community.

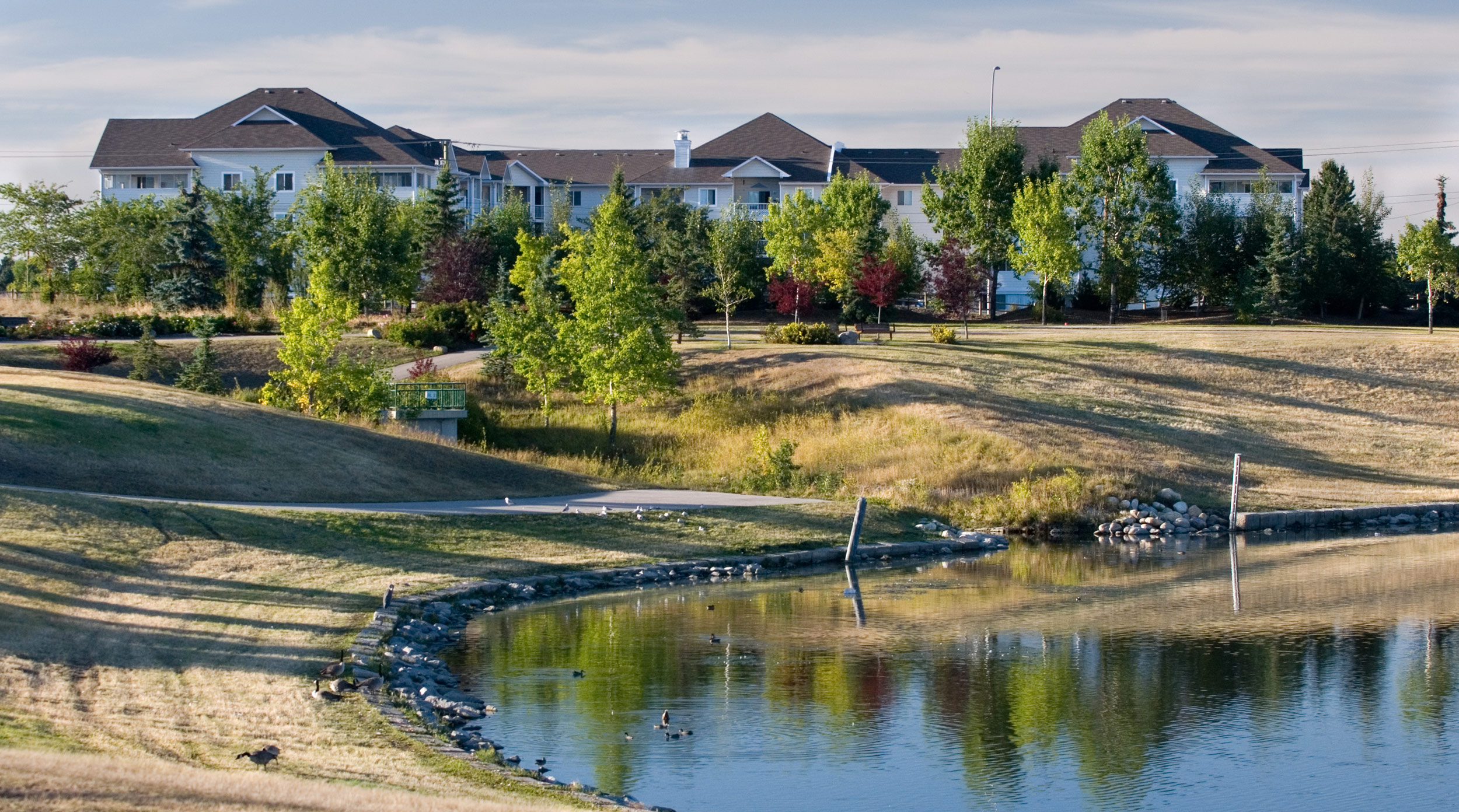
Condominiums in Red Carpet overlooking Elliston Park

== History ==
The Calgary Village Trailer Park located inside of Red Carpet originally went by the name of 'Penbrooke Heritage Estates', but was renamed.

== Demographics ==
In the City of Calgary's 2021 municipal census, Red Carpet had a population of 1,745 living in 915 dwellings With a land area of 0.6 km^{2} (0.23 sq mi), it had a population density of 2,910/km^{2} (7,500/sq mi) in 2021.

Residents in this community had a median household income of $59,200 in 2021, and 17% of Red Carpet residents were low-income. As of 2021, 23% of the residents were immigrants. A proportion of 27.5% of the buildings were condominiums or apartments, with the remainder (72.5%) being mobile homes, and 32% of the housing was used for renting. 30% of Red Carpet residents spent 30%+ of their income on housing, compared to the Calgary average of 23%.

Pop. Overtime
Year	Population
2014	1705
2015	1668
2016	1727
2017	1605
2018	1596
2019	1594
2021	1745

== Crime ==
In the May 2023-May 2024 data period, Red Carpet had a crime rate of 2.636/100, an increase from the previous data period.

This puts it at this comparison to other Calgary communities: Saddle Ridge (1.358/100), Whitehorn (1.741/100), Rundle (2.342/100), Brentwood (2.348/100), Acadia (2.542/100), Red Carpet (2.636/100), Bowness (2.934/100), Shawnessy (3.296/100), Inglewood (3.438/100), Sunnyside (3.650/100), Marlborough (4.703/100), Southwood (5.147/100), Sunalta (5.307/100), Montgomery (5.483/100), Forest Lawn (6.528/100), Rosscarrock (7.049/100), Downtown Commercial Core (12.705/100), Downtown East Village (15.605/100), Manchester (43.368/100).

=== Crime data by year ===
Crime Data
Year	Crime Rate (/100)
2018	2.1
2019	2.2
2020	2.3
2021	2.6
2022	1.8
2023	2.8

== See also ==
- List of neighbourhoods in Calgary
