= Joane Cardinal-Schubert High School =

Location
- 19480 - 45 Street S.E. Calgary, Alberta; Canada; 50.878306°N 113.944467°W

Information
- Type: Public
- Motto: Motto: Active, Inclusive, & Meaningful
- Established: 2018
- School board: Calgary Board of Education
- Principal: Scott Glassford
- Grades: 10–12
- Enrollment: 1904 (September 30, 2024)
  - Grade 10: 604
  - Grade 11: 647
  - Grade 12: 653
- Area: Area V, Ward 14
- Colours: Black, Yellow, Red
- Team name: Ravens
- Communities served: Auburn Bay, Copperfield, Cranston, Mahogany, Seton
- Feeder schools: Dr. George Stanley. Dr. Martha Cohen. Nickle School. Lakeshore School.
- Website: school.cbe.ab.ca/school/joanecardinalschubert/

Joane Cardinal-Schubert High School (JCS) is a public high school in Calgary, Alberta, Canada operated by the Calgary Board of Education. It was founded in 2018 and the first year of attendance was 1129 students. It has approximately 2104 students and around 96 staff members. It is named after the artist Joane Cardinal-Schubert. The school's mascot is a raven.

== Academics ==
Teaching and learning at Joane Cardinal-Schubert follows conventional classroom standards - students receive instruction in the classroom, and apply learned concepts through homework. Unlike the rest of the Calgary Board of Education, academic performance is determined through "outcome based reporting".

=== Advanced Placement (AP) ===
Joane Cardinal-Schubert is an AP-offering school.
