= Green Line (Calgary) =

Future light rail transit (LRT) line in Calgary, Alberta

Overview
- Status: Under construction
- Owner: Calgary Transit
- Locale: Calgary, Alberta, Canada
- Termini: SE Segment: Event Centre/Grand Central Station Full vision: 160 Avenue N; SE Segment: Shepard Full vision: Seton
- Stations: SE Segment: 10; Full vision: 29
- Website: www.calgary.ca/greenline

Service
- Type: Light rail
- System: CTrain
- Route number: 203
- Operator: Calgary Transit
- Depot: Shepard
- Rolling stock: CAF Urbos 100

History
- Planned opening: ≈2031

Technical
- Line length: SE Segment: 16 kilometres (9.9 mi); Full vision: 46 kilometres (29 mi)
- Number of tracks: 2
- Character: At-grade and elevated street running
- Track gauge: 1,435 mm (4 ft 8 1/2 in)
- Electrification: Overhead lines, 750 V DC
- Operating speed: 80 kilometres per hour (50 mph)

The Green Line, also known as Route 203, is an expansion of the light rail (LRT) network in Calgary, Alberta, planned to run between Calgary's north-central and southeastern boundaries, connecting with the Red Line and the Blue Line in the city's downtown. The Green Line is the largest public infrastructure project in Calgary's history and the first rail line in Calgary to operate low-floor trains. If completed, the full vision of the Green Line would comprise 29 stations spanning 46 kilometres (29 mi), bringing the total number of CTrain stations in Calgary from 53 to 82.

Like the Red Line and Blue Line, the Green Line will be constructed in phases. The first phase to be built stretches from 16 Avenue N in the downtown to Shepard Station in the SE and will include two segments: the SE Segment and the Downtown Segment. The first segment to be constructed is the SE Segment, with 10 stations and 16 km of track from Event Centre/Grand Central Station to Shepard. The project is funded with three roughly equal contributions from the City of Calgary, the Government of Alberta, and the Government of Canada.

The Green Line groundbreaking event took place on June 26, 2025, marking the official start of construction for Phase 1 of the project. The ceremony was held at the site of the future Shepard LRT station and Green Line's Maintenance and Storage Facility. Officials from the three funding partners—the city of Calgary, province of Alberta and Government of Canada—were present to mark this significant milestone.

Major construction was planned to begin in early 2021 but was delayed to April 2022 after Alberta's United Conservative provincial government failed to contribute the province's pledged portion of the line's funding. The government rebuked the project as a "line to nowhere", asserting that the City of Calgary did not have "any credible plan" despite nearly four decades of research and planning. This came after months of speculation from city officials, politicians, and journalists that the provincial government and others associated with the United Conservative Party were attempting to stifle or cancel the Green Line.

Due to the provincial government's actions, the City of Calgary temporarily paused the project's procurement though planning, pre-construction and public engagement continued through 2021. Delays persisted until the project received final approval from Alberta's provincial government on July 7, 2021, hours after Prime Minister Justin Trudeau met privately with Jason Kenney in Calgary. This meant the project had full approval from all three orders of government and Prime Minister Justin Trudeau stated "The money is there and the agreements are signed, so regardless of an election, the Green Line is going to go forward."

Construction of the Green Line officially began in April 2022 with PCL Construction selected as the construction management contractor for utility relocation work. The Green Line Board released the Request for Proposals (RFP) to select a proponent to construct Phase 1 on September 26, 2022. In April 2023, Green Line entered the Development Phase of the project and began the comprehensive design of the alignment. As of February 2026, Phase 1 is planned to consist of 12 stations running from 7 Avenue SW in downtown to Shepard in the south.

== Description ==
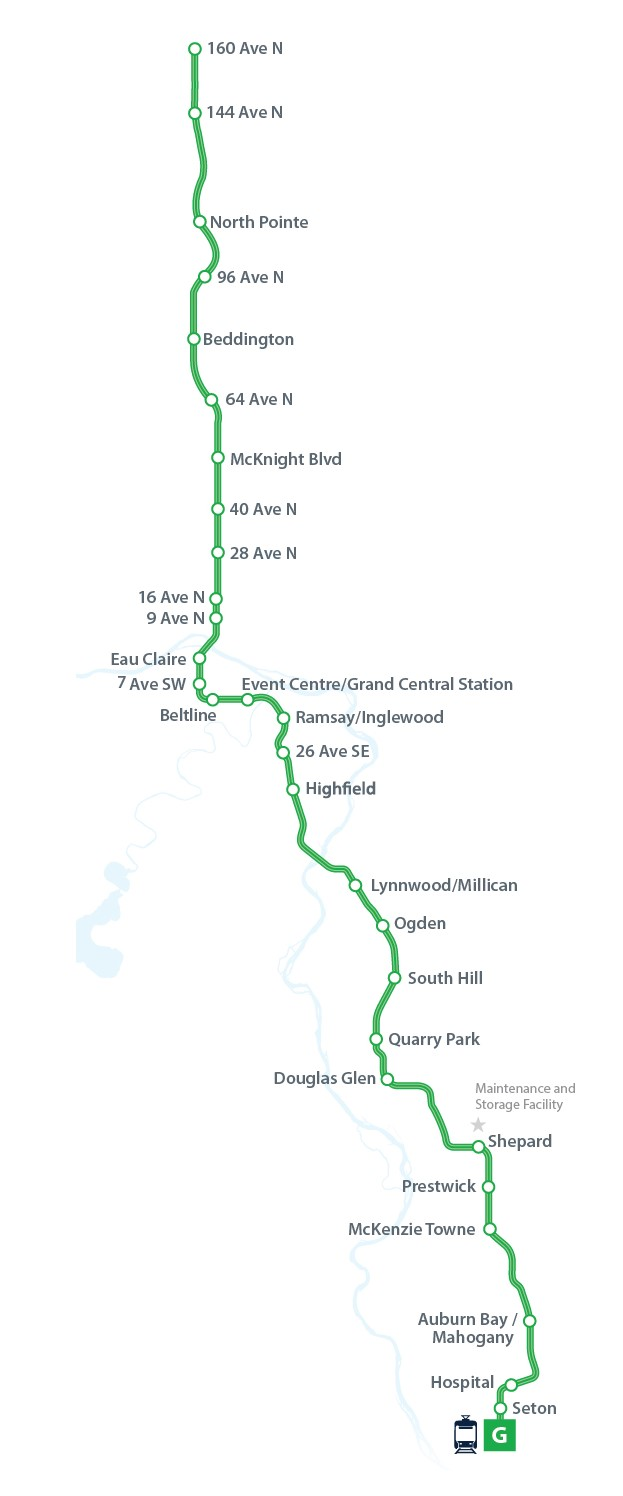
Map of the full vision of the Green Line LRT, spanning 46 km from 160 Ave N to Seton.

The Green Line LRT will be an urban and suburban light-rail line using low-floor trains, the CAF Urbos 100, integrated as part of Calgary's CTrain system. Like the rest of Calgary's rail transit network, the Green Line will be entirely powered by wind power to help in reducing pollution and make Calgary a cleaner-energy city. Operation of the line will be publicly funded by municipal taxation along with rider fares, and will be administered by Calgary Transit.

Generally, stations will be smaller and less elaborate than existing CTrain stations, due to the use of low-floor trains. The SE Segment, from Shepard to Event Centre/Grand Central Station, will run as a light metro similar to the existing Red Line and Blue Line, with dedicated tracks, bells and gates on at-grade crossings and free standing stations. The track between 26 Avenue SE station and Ramsay/Inglewood station will be elevated on a guideway similar to the existing Sunalta station like with many other major metro lines in the world.

Future phases of the full 46km Green Line vision include a bridge crossing the Bow River northwards, with two multi-use pathways, and connecting to Centre Street, north of the Centre Street Bridge. The train will then run northward in the centre two lanes of Centre Street in a dedicated right of way as an urban tramway, leaving two lanes for car traffic south of McKnight Boulevard and four lanes north of McKnight Boulevard. Stations south of 26 Avenue SE will be at-grade stations with a section of elevated track crossing the intersection of Barlow Trail SE and 114 Avenue SE.

The train will run without gates, bells or fences on most at-grade crossings along Centre Street. The train will then continue northward; tracks will eventually enter into the median of Harvest Hills Boulevard, and the line will eventually span north of Stoney Trail into the exurban community of Keystone.

== Stations and route ==
The full vision of the line will run from north-central to southeast Calgary on 46 kilometres (29 mi) of track and will feature 29 stations. This will bring the total number of CTrain stations in Calgary to 74. The planned Green Line corridor is currently served via three bus rapid transit (BRT) routes: Route 300 (operating the Calgary International Airport and downtown, primarily along Centre Street), Route 301 (between North Pointe and downtown) and Route 302 (between Seton and downtown). Like the Red Line and Blue Line, the Green Line will be built in stages as funding is made available. Phase 1 of construction will extend from 7 Avenue SW, through downtown Calgary, to Shepard.

=== Green Line (Phase 1) ===
Station	Grade	Opening	Platform type	Parking spaces	Approximate location
7 Avenue SW	TBD	TBD	Centre	None	51°02′49″N 114°04′05″W At 7 Avenue and 2 Street SW in Downtown Calgary, connection to the Red Line and Blue Line
Beltline	TBD	TBD	Centre	None	51°02′37″N 114°04′01″W On 10 Avenue SW, between 1 and 2 streets SW in Beltline
Event Centre/Grand Central Station	At-grade	2031	Centre	None	51°02′36″N 114°02′59″W Adjacent to the existing freight rail tracks between 9 and 10 avenues SE, and between 5 and 6 streets SE.
Ramsay/Inglewood	Elevated	2031	Side	None	51°02′23″N 114°02′15″W Adjacent to the existing freight rail tracks near 11 Street and 12 Street SE, in Inglewood and Ramsay.
26 Avenue SE	Elevated	2031	Side	None	51°01′47″N 114°02′11″W At 26 Avenue and 11 Street SE, elevated west of Crossroads Market.
Highfield	At-grade	2031	Centre	None	51°01′13″N 114°01′57″W Near Highfield Boulevard and Ogden Road SE, in Highfield, the city's oldest industrial area.
Lynnwood/Millican	At-grade	2031	Side	600	50°59′56″N 114°00′34″W At Ogden Road and Millican Road SE adjacent to the Pop Davies Athletic Park in Lynnwood and Millican Estates.
Ogden	At-grade	2031	Side	None	50°59′21″N 113°59′59″W Near Ogden Road and 72 Avenue SE in the community of Ogden, at the Canadian Pacific Railway headquarters.
South Hill	At-grade	2031	Side	None	50°58′36″N 113°59′39″W Near Glenmore Trail and 24 Street SE adjacent to Riverbend.
Quarry Park	At-grade	2031	Side	None	50°57′46″N 114°00′05″W Near Quarry Park Boulevard, along 24 Street SE in Quarry Park.
Douglas Glen	At-grade	2031	Side	465	50°57′09″N 113°59′50″W Adjacent to 114 Avenue SE near 29 Street SE in Douglasdale/Douglasglen.
Shepard	At-grade	2031	Side	920	50°56′10″N 113°57′59″W At the northern end of 48 Street SE, at the South Trail Crossing shopping centre.

=== Planned northern expansion ===
Station	Grade	Opening	Platform type	Parking spaces	Approximate location
160 Avenue N	At-grade	TBD	Centre	None	51°11′45″N 114°04′17″W On Centre Street N, at 160 Avenue N, in the outer suburban community of Keystone, and north terminus of full vision
144 Avenue N	At-grade	TBD	Centre	None	51°10′51″N 114°04′17″W On Centre Street N, at 144 Avenue N, north of Stoney Trail, in the community of Livingston
North Pointe	At-grade	TBD	Centre	TBD	51°09′34″N 114°04′17″W On Harvest Hills Boulevard, at Panamount Boulevard in Coventry Hills and Panorama Hills
96 Avenue N	At-grade	TBD	Side	TBD	51°08′36″N 114°04′05″W On Harvest Hills Boulevard, at 96 Street N in Country Hills and Harvest Hills, future Calgary International Airport connection
Beddington	At-grade	TBD	Side	TBD	51°07′40″N 114°04′17″W On Centre Street N, north of Beddington Boulevard in Beddington Heights
64 Avenue N	At-grade	TBD	Side	None	51°06′47″N 114°03′50″W On Centre Street N, north of 64 Avenue N in Huntington Hills
McKnight Boulevard	At-grade	TBD	Side	None	51°06′06″N 114°03′45″W On Centre Street N, north of McKnight Blvd in Thorncliffe
40 Avenue N	At-grade	TBD	Side	None	51°05′17″N 114°03′45″W On Centre Street N, at 40 Avenue N in Highland Park near the Greenview industrial area
28 Avenue N	At-grade	TBD	Side	None	51°04′43″N 114°03′45″W On Centre Street N, at 29 Avenue N in Tuxedo Park
16 Avenue N	At-grade	TBD	Side	None	51°03′58″N 114°03′45″W On Centre Street N, between 15 and 16 avenues in Crescent Heights.
9 Avenue N	At-grade	TBD	Side	None	51°03′36″N 114°03′45″W On Centre Street N, between 8 and 9 avenues in Crescent Heights.
Eau Claire	TBD	TBD	TBD	None	51°03′9″N 114°04′04″W Near 2 Street and Riverfront Avenue SW.

=== Planned southern expansion ===
Station	Grade	Opening	Platform type	Parking spaces	Approximate location
Prestwick	At-grade	TBD	Side	TBD	50°55′36″N 113°57′31″W Adjacent to New Brighton at Prestwick Gate and 52 Street SE
McKenzie Towne	At-grade	TBD	Side	TBD	50°54′56″N 113°57′26″W In McKenzie Towne at McKenzie Towne Avenue and 52 Street SE
Auburn Bay / Mahogany	At-grade	TBD	Side	TBD	50°53′41″N 113°56′35″W In Auburn Bay and Mahogany, at Auburn Meadows Avenue and 52 Street SE, south of Stoney Trail
Hospital	At-grade	TBD	Side	None	50°52′48″N 113°56′54″W At the South Health Campus, adjacent to Market Street SE
Seton	At-grade	TBD	Centre	TBD	50°52′19″N 113°57′14″W At Seton Avenue and Seton Way SE, in the community of Seton, and south terminus of full vision

=== Expansion timeline and funding ===
Though the alignment and general design of future expansions have been approved by the city council, the timeline and funding of future extensions has not yet been determined. Construction of Phase 1 builds the most complex and expensive segment of the line first - allowing incremental, relatively simple expansion of the line as funding becomes available. The full build-out of the line is estimated to require an additional CA$2–3 billion.

In 2019, several potential Stage 2 build-outs were evaluated for variable amounts of potential future funding. These were:

- $250–400 million:
  - South to McKenzie Towne
- $400–700 million:
  - North to 40 Avenue N or
  - South to Auburn Bay / Mahogany
- $700 million–$1 billion:
  - North to 64 Avenue N or
  - South to Seton or
  - North to 40 Avenue N and south to Auburn Bay / Mahogany

=== Additional infrastructure ===
When completed, Phase 1 of the Green Line will feature:

- 28 low floor light rail trains, each 42 metres (138 ft) long
- 17.2 kilometres (10.7 mi) of twin LRT track
- 12 stations
- 3 park and ride facilities with a total of 1,800 – 1,900 stalls (Lynnwood/Millican, Douglas Glen, and Shepard)
- 1 kilometre (0.62 mi) of elevated track between Ramsay/Inglewood to 26 Avenue SE stations
- 1 light rail vehicle (LRV) maintenance and storage facility, at Shepard Station

When the full line is complete, it will also feature 12 bridges, 10 park and ride facilities (with 5,000 to 6,000 parking stalls), a bridge connecting Eau Claire to Centre Street North, and 2 LRV maintenance and storage facilities (at Shepard and 96 Avenue N).

== Impact ==
When the full vision is completed, from 160 Ave N to Seton, it's expected that 140,000 people will ride the Green Line every day. Stage 1 of construction is expected to have a daily ridership of 65,000 people. The city plans on creating many high density transit oriented development along the line once it is complete similar to how some areas around the existing C-Train lines have been redeveloped. The line will reduce travel times for existing north-central BRT and southeast BRT riders by an average of 25 minutes.

The project is part of the city's plan to reduce emissions and meet Canada's Paris Agreement targets. Like the current C-Train Lines, the Green Line will be entirely powered by wind generated electricity and is expected to reduce greenhouse gas emissions by 67,000 tonnes of carbon dioxide per year, equivalent to 14,200 fewer vehicles on Calgary's roadways.

Deerfoot Trail is currently the primary transportation route from north-central to southeast Calgary. It is the busiest freeway in Alberta, and suffers from chronic congestion. Calgarians spent an average of 15.7 hours in peak hour congestion in 2016. The Green Line alignment runs roughly parallel to Deerfoot Trail and when finished, will provide a competitive alternative to driving on the freeway resulting in an improved quality of life for Calgarians and reduced congestion on Deerfoot and its connecting roads.

=== Anticipated Ridership ===
Stations	2028	2048
Eau Claire	6,500	9,200
7 Avenue SW	22,600	34,600
Centre Street S	3,400	5,400
4 Street SE	1,800	6,500
Ramsay/Inglewood	2,900	4,900
26 Avenue S	700	1,700
Highfield	1,000	1,600
Lynnwood/Millican	1,100	1,400
Ogden	1,300	2,000
South Hill	2,100	3,200
Quarry Park	900	2,100
Douglas Glen	2,900	3,100
Shepard	11,400	15,200

== History ==
=== Early history ===
Trams ran on the surface of Centre Street for 41 years, from 1909 to 1950. The Green Line will restore the historic alignment of Calgary's trams, running trains on the surface of Centre Street as well.

The Green Line was first envisioned in 1983, two years after Calgary's first LRT line opened. As early as 1986, the communities of McKenzie Towne, New Brighton and Copperfield had set aside land along 52 Street SE for the future line. In 1987, the city then conducted the Southeast Mass Transit Corridor Study and concluded that southeast Calgary would one day require a dedicated light rail line.

=== Original proposal ===
In 2010, the city anticipated that the Green Line would be required before Calgary's population reached 1.25 million, though the city surpassed that population just 5 years later. Chronic congestion on Deerfoot Trail is partly attributed to the failure to construct the Green Line before the 1.25 million population target.

In 2011, the city began considering three possible alignments for the north-central leg of the Green Line: along Nose Creek adjacent to Deerfoot Trail, on Edmonton Trail, or on Centre Street. After engagement with the public, the city selected Centre Street as the preferred alignment.

In 2012, the Green Line was proposed as two separate new lines — one from downtown to north central and one from downtown to the southeast. The division of the line was rejected by council. Through 2016, $101 million had been spent on right-of-way acquisition and preliminary studies.

In May 2017, the city revealed the line's suggested alignment and announced it would be built in stages due to the unexpectedly high costs of certain design choices. Although the original estimate for the entire 28-station Green Line was $4.5 billion, the cost of stage one alone, including the $1.95 billion cost of the centre city tunnel, was estimated at $4.65 billion.

=== Funding and alignment changes ===
In 2015, the Government of Canada announced that it would invest a historic $1.53 billion in the Green Line, the single largest federal investment for an infrastructure project in Alberta. In early 2019, Alberta's NDP provincial government committed $1.53 billion in funding paid for by the provincial carbon tax. Over time, the City of Calgary set aside funding for the Green Line and has designated a $1.53 billion investment in the project. The Green Line is funded by three roughly equal contributions from all three orders of government.

In late 2019, after the 2019 Alberta General Election, the newly elected United Conservative provincial government cut the Green Line's budget by 86 percent and passed legislation allowing their government to terminate their contribution "without cause" and with only 90 days notice. This move complicated the city's ability to move forward with the project, hindered the city's access to the federal government's investment and raised uncertainty among potential procurement bidders.

On May 12, 2020, the city proposed a new alignment of the line to keep the project within budget. The revised alignment replaced the deep-earth tunnel under the Bow River with a Bridge with an additional multi-use pathway over Prince's Island Park, connecting Eau Claire and Crescent Heights for pedestrians and cyclists. The elimination of the tunnel under the river reduces construction cost and risk.

The changes also brought the line to the surface between 9 Avenue N and 16 Avenue N, running along the two centre lanes of Centre Street in a dedicated right of way. The Green Line north of 16 Avenue N has been planned as a surface running train since the city's 2017 recommendations. The changes also included the addition of 9 Avenue N station in Crescent Heights, increasing the number of stations in stage one of construction to 15, and bringing the total number of stations to 29. Eau Claire station and 4 Street SE station were moved from being at-grade to underground and the Beltline section of the line was moved one block north to run under 11 Avenue South, rather than under 12 Avenue S as initially recommended.

The plan for a tunnel under the intersection of Barlow Trail and 114 Avenue SE was scrapped in favour of an elevated guideway over the intersection, and the park and ride at Shepard station was revised from a parkade to a surface parking lot.

On July 30, 2024, the city decided on changes to the Phase 1 alignment to address the impact of cost overruns. The revised Phase 1 alignment runs from Eau Claire but terminates at Lynnwood/Millican instead of Shepard. The new alignment also moves 4 Street SE from underground to at-grade to better integrate with planned future passenger rail and the planned "Grand Central Station", and moves the Maintenance and Storage Facility to Highfield Station instead of Shepard. The change also includes the deferral of Centre Street S to a future phase in order to minimize cost overruns.

=== Opposition ===
As the project's approval was looming in early 2020, a group of business people, some with ties to the United Conservative Party, organized an invite only event at the Calgary Petroleum Club with city officials. Despite speculation that the group's objective was to cancel the project despite its popular public support, some attendees insisted otherwise. One of the participants, oil industry executive and multimillionaire Jim Gray, suggested the group was not opposed to the line but instead wanted to "de-risk" it.

The group called for replacing half of the rail line with a bus, cancelling the downtown subway, and for the use of high-floor trains. The group also funneled thousands of dollars into an online advertising campaign opposing the Green Line under the titles of "An Ad Hoc Committee of Calgary Citizens", "Rethink the Green Line", and "Green Line Done Right".

Rethink the Green Line has continued its campaign against the Green Line through 2024. The group has been noted for disseminating disinformation about the project and has made objectively incorrect claims in an attempt to garner opposition, such as the unfounded assertion that property taxes could increase by 90 percent if built.

The group also published editorials in local newspapers, like the Calgary Herald, making a variety of dubious claims about the project and calling for its pause or cancellation. Additionally, the group hung anti-Green Line flyers in communities around the city and operated a website opposing the Green Line. In December 2020, the United Conservative Minister of Transportation, Ric McIver, rebuked the Green Line saying in a statement that the train is a "line to nowhere" and the city does not have "any credible plan". After an additional 6 months of delays subsequent to McIver's statement saying the project's technical plans were inadequate, the province then announced the technical issues had been resolved despite no changes to the line's design or alignment.

Despite the issue cited as the reason the province failed to contribute their pledged portion of the project's funding being resolved, the United Conservative provincial government then announced that it would continue withholding funding, the city needed to produce a new business case for the line, and it would be investing in the widening of Deerfoot Trail. The Alberta provincial government has also retained legislation allowing them to revoke their contribution with only 90 days notice. Officials say this move complicates the project's procurement, increased the project's overall cost by millions of dollars and delayed the project by one year. Despite these actions, the provincial government maintains publicly that they support the idea of the Green Line.

On July 7, 2021, Prime Minister Justin Trudeau met privately with then-Alberta Premier Jason Kenney at the Fairmount Palliser Hotel in downtown Calgary. Less than three hours later, the Alberta Government announced it had approved the Green Line without modifications and would contribute their pledged portion of the line's funding. After over a year of delays inflicted by the provincial government, Prime Minister Justin Trudeau, Mayor Naheed Nenshi, members of council, and various other stakeholders gathered at the Oliver Bowen Light Rail Maintenance Facility in Calgary to announce the Green Line would continue as planned. Jason Kenney declined to attend the announcement and sent no provincial representatives.

Alberta's current premier, Danielle Smith, called the Green Line a "catastrophically bad decision", a "fantasy", and an "excessively expensive line that goes nowhere and never will". Danielle Smith also asserted that the Green Line is "of no real use to anyone", praised the organized effort to stifle or cancel the Green Line, and called for replacing half of the rail line with a bus.

=== Approval and public opinion ===
On June 16, 2020, council voted 14 to 1 to approve construction Stage 1 of the Green Line despite vocal opposition from a small group of wealthy and influential businesspeople. The project received final approval from all three orders of government on July 7, 2021. Several polls conducted in 2020 and 2021 have suggested that the project has popular public support. A poll conducted in June 2020 found 68.7 percent of Calgarians in support of the project with its updated 2020 alignment. According to a 2021 survey conducted by the City of Calgary, 90 percent of respondents said the Green Line is important to the future of the city and 89 percent said it is an important addition to the city's transportation network.

The CA$5.5 billion cost of Stage 1 will be shared in roughly equal portions between the federal government, provincial government, and the City of Calgary. On July 10, 2021, Prime Minister Justin Trudeau said "The money is there and the agreements are signed, so regardless of an election, the Green Line is going to go forward."

=== Construction ===
The City of Calgary began early works construction in 2017 with utility relocation and environmental redemption projects along the alignment of the line and spent over $500 million. In November 2021, Construcciones y Auxiliar de Ferrocarriles (CAF) was awarded the contract to supply Green Line's new fleet of low floor trains.

Construction on the Green Line officially began in April 2022 with PCL Construction selected as the construction management contractor working on deep utility relocations to prepare the Downtown and Beltline alignment areas for tunneling. The Green Line Board released the Request for Proposals (RFP) to select a proponent to construct phase one of stage one of construction, from Shepard to Eau Claire, on September 26, 2022.

The city announced the selection of Bow Transit Connectors (a joint venture between Barnard Constructors of Canada, LP and Flatiron Constructors Canada Ltd) to build phase one of the line on April 29, 2023. On June 5, 2023, Green Line selected Graham Construction to construct the 78 Avenue SE Grade Separation and Ogden Pedestrian Tunnel Project (“78 Avenue Project”) to prepare the area around the future Ogden Station.

Phase 1 of construction is expected to be completed approximately in 2031.

Despite spending billions on feasibility studies and preparation, the City voted to wind down the Green Line on September 17, 2024. A month later, Calgary and the provincial government agreed to build the southeast section of Green Line and revive five cancelled stops. Official ground breaking of the project occurred on June 26, 2025.
