= Baywest Homes =

Reaixential home builder in Canada

- Founded: 1985; 41 years ago
- Founder: Dale Roh, Harry Denger
- Headquarters: Calgary, Alberta
- Website: baywesthomes.com

Baywest Homes is a residential home builder with operations in Calgary, Alberta, Canada and is a division of Bordeaux Developments. The company was founded in 1985 by Dale Roh and Harry Denger, and partnered with Bordeaux Developments in 2001. Baywest has built over 1,000 homes in the Calgary area.

== Locations ==
Baywest Homes has built in the Calgary communities of Tuscany and Sage Hill, Auburn Bay, Mahogany, Rancher's Rise The Ranches, Riverstone, Westland Estates and Cranston Ridge.

The company has also built homes outside Calgary, including Jumping Pound Ridge in Cochrane and Ki in Springbank.

== Recognition ==
Baywest Homes has been the recipient of a number of Sales and Marketing (SAM) Awards which recognize creative and professional work in the Calgary home building industry.

The table below summarizes the SAM Awards that Baywest Homes has received since 2000.

== Charity work ==
Building Hope for Kids: A Night in Manhattan (2012) - Baywest Homes co-sponsored this fundraiser event the Alberta Children's Hospital Foundation. The event was held in at the Telus Convention Centre.

Caring for Kids Radiothon (2012) - Baywest Homes supported this event as a part of Brookfield Residential in February 2012. Brookfield served as a co-sponsor of the fundraiser event, which raised over $1.9 million for the Alberta Children's Hospital Foundation.

Build it Forward (2011) - This initiative, headed by the country music singer Paul Brandt, involves building houses for families in need and having them "build it forward" by participating in other community initiatives. Baywest Homes was a featured builder for the initiative, which was shown on CMT Canada.
