= Cranston, Calgary =

Cranston
- Neighbourhood
- Location of Cranston in Calgary
- Coordinates: 50°53′32″N 113°59′01″W
- Country: Canada
- Province: Alberta
- City: Calgary
- Quadrant: SE
- Ward: 12

Government
  - Mayor: Jeromy Farkas
  - Administrative body: Calgary City Council
  - Councillor: Mike Jamieson (A Better Calgary)
- Elevation: 1,045 m (3,428 ft)

Population (2010)
  - Total: 9,645
- Website: Cranston Community Association

Cranston is a master planned residential community in the southeast quadrant of Calgary, Alberta by Carma Developments who started development of the farming land in 1999. Cranston contains a wide range of single family and multi family residential as well as commercial property. It has two public elementary schools, one separate board K-9 school and one separate board K-6 school, as well as Century Hall - a private Cranston residents recreation facility. It is bounded by Stoney Trail to the north and Fish Creek Park and the Bow River to the west and south. Its eastern boundary is Deerfoot Trail and the community of Auburn Bay and the mixed use town centre development of Seton and South Health Campus hospital. It is represented in the Calgary City Council by the Ward 12 councillor.

== Demographics ==
In the City of Calgary's 2012 municipal census, Cranston had a population of 11,857 living in 4,625 dwellings, a 9.5% increase from its 2011 population of 10,831. With a land area of 8.3 km^{2} (3.2 sq mi), it had a population density of 1,429/km^{2} (3,700/sq mi) in 2012.

== Education ==
In September 2010, the Calgary Board of Education opened Cranston Elementary School which serves K-4 students residing in Cranston. Additionally, the Calgary Catholic School District opened the Christ the King School in September 2010. In January 2017, Doctor George Stanley school opened.

== Transit ==
Cranston is served by Calgary Transit Bus Route 14 in the west end, Route 75 in the east end, and Route 79 in the South End.

== Community amenities ==
Cranston Market is a feature of the community that provides the residents of the community many different stores and services.

== Cranston Residents Association ==
Directly across the street from the Market is Cranston Residents Association (CRA) at Century Hall. Residents of Cranston have access to the facility included with the homeowner association fees and can bring up to five guests per household. The facility is not-for-profit company that is professionally managed and operated. Residents of Cranston get access included with homeowner association fees, which also provide maintenance of several community features such as entry ways and boulevards. Non-residents are able to access the facility with a small fee. There is a full size gymnasium as well as a 2.8-hectare (7-acre) gated park which includes tennis courts, hockey rink, basketball courts, a playground and a splash park. The gym and ice rink operate on a strict schedule. An up to date copy is available on the website or by calling the front desk. Schedules are subject to change without notice.

Registered programs include various children and adult activities ranging from tennis, ballet, art classes, and yoga. Residents of Cranston and those who live in a Calgary Brookfield community are able to register for a discounted price, others pay in full. CRA also run themed day camp's for school aged children during winter, spring, and summer.

Riverstone is a residential community located within the district of Cranston in Calgary, Alberta. It is bounded by natural green spaces and Fish Creek Provincial Park, with a network of pathways providing access throughout the area.

The Cranston Residents Association (CRA) provides supplemental maintenance and community services for Riverstone, including seasonal lighting displays, landscaping, maintenance of pet waste stations, and community-specific events.

== See also ==
- List of neighbourhoods in Calgary
