= James K. Gray =

Canadian businessman

James Kenneth Gray OC AOE CBHF is a Canadian businessman and philanthropist. He was born in Kirkland Lake, Ontario in 1933. He was educated at Ridley College in St. Catharines, Canada. He came to Calgary in 1956 to pursue a career in Alberta's energy sector. In 1973, he co-founded Canadian Hunter Exploration, an organization that became one of Canada's largest and most successful natural gas companies."

Gray has served as an independent director of Brookfield Asset Management (an NYSE listed company) since April 1997. He is also a director emeritus of Canadian National Railway, director of Phoenix Technology Services, and Honorary Chair of the Canada West Foundation.

Gray has led the Ad Hoc Citizens Committee to Rethink the Green Line, which has lobbied for significant changes to Calgary's Green Line CTrain project.

Gray was recognized in 2002 with the Alberta Order of Excellence.
