= Eau Claire, Calgary =

Eau Claire
- Neighbourhood
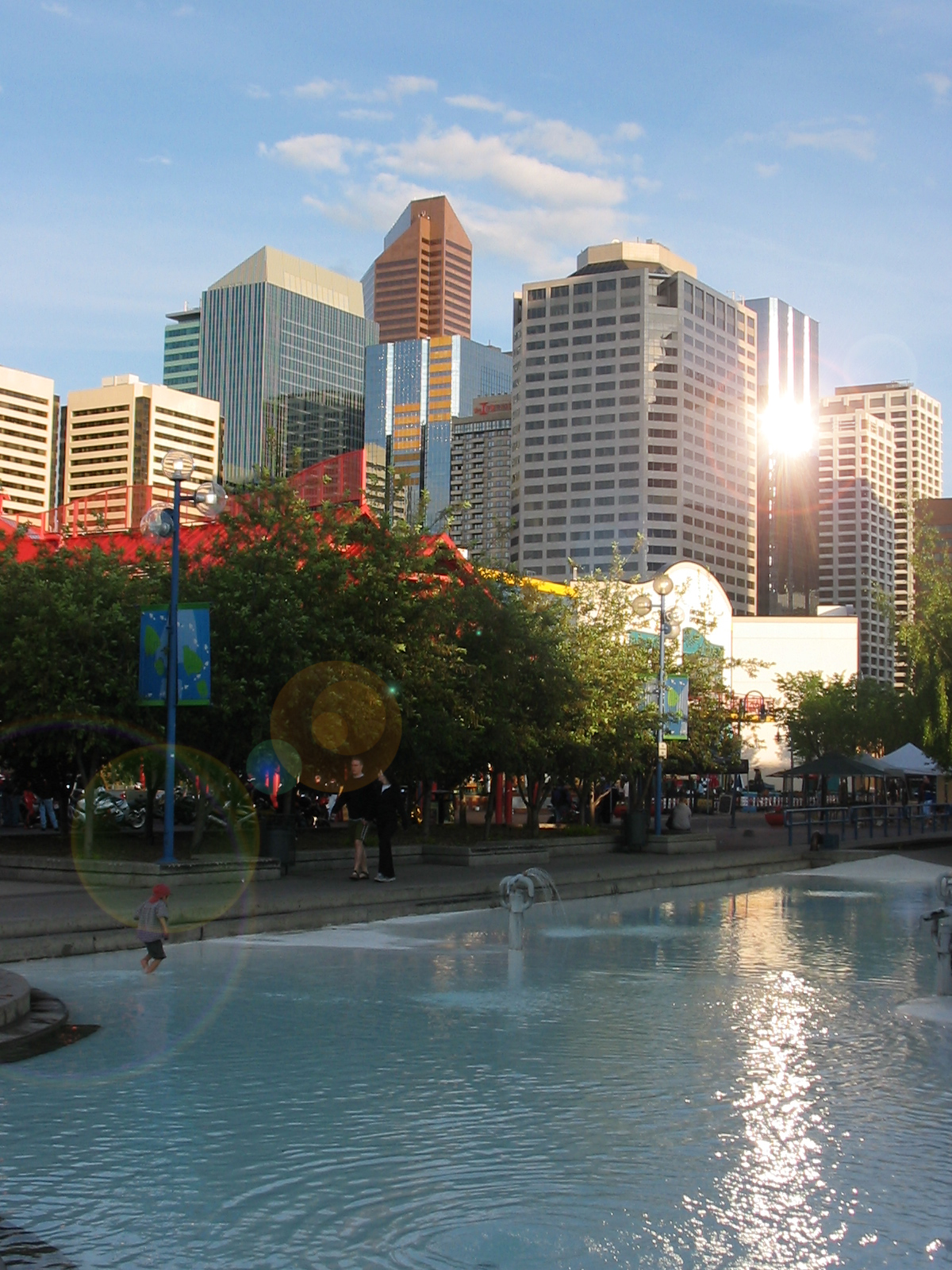
- Festival plaza in Eau Claire

- Location of Eau Claire in Calgary
- Coordinates: 51°03′11″N 114°04′17″W
- Country: Canada
- Province: Alberta
- City: Calgary
- Quadrant: SW
- Ward: 7
- Established: 1885

Government
  - Mayor: Jeromy Farkas
  - Administrative body: Calgary City Council
  - Councillor: Myke Atkinson (Independent)

Area
  - Total: 0.4 km^{2} (0.15 sq mi)
- Elevation: 1,045 m (3,428 ft)

Population (2006)
  - Total: 1,717
  - Average Income: $80,210
- Website: Eau Claire Community Association

The neighbourhood of Eau Claire in Calgary, Alberta, Canada is located immediately north of Downtown, and south of the Bow River and north of 4th Avenue. A mix of riverside condominiums, shopping, restaurants, hotels, a large public plaza and urban parkland make Eau Claire one of Calgary's most popular areas. Contained within Eau Claire is the city's Festival District.

The area, which was developed from reclaimed industrial land, fronts the Bow River and sits immediately north of 3rd Avenue South. North of Eau Claire is Prince's Island Park, a large urban park on an island in the Bow River and the site of many summer festivals, including the Calgary Folk Music Festival, Carifest, Shakespeare in the Park and various busking happenings. Within Eau Claire is a variety of pubs and restaurants. It is also located on the city's large network of pedestrian pathways and trails, along the Bow River pathway.

== History ==
The name Eau Claire derives from one of Calgary's original industries - a sawmill transplanted from Eau Claire, Wisconsin and staffed by mostly Norwegian mill workers. The area on the banks of the Bow River was selected in 1886 for its easy access to fallen timber. The community was subsequently named for the Eau Claire Lumber Company.

Eau Claire Plaza, at the core of the Festival District, underwent a major modernization and redevelopment to better integrate it with the city, Prince's Island, Barclay Mall and the other surrounding hotels, restaurants and businesses. (Eau Claire Market was torn down in 2024 to make way for the new LRT Green Line.) The community has an area redevelopment plan in place. The plaza reopened in July 2025.

== Demographics ==
In the City of Calgary's 2012 municipal census, Eau Claire had a population of 1,851 living in 1,328 dwellings, an 8.2% increase from its 2011 population of 1,711. With a land area of 0.5 km^{2} (0.19 sq mi), it had a population density of 3,700/km^{2} (9,600/sq mi) in 2012.

Residents in this community had a median household income of $80,210 in 2000, and there were 21.8% low income residents living in the neighbourhood. As of 2000, 32.7% of the residents were immigrants. A proportion of 98% of the buildings were condominiums or apartments, and 38.7% of the housing was used for renting.

It is represented in the Calgary City Council by the Ward 7 councillor.

== Eau Claire Market ==
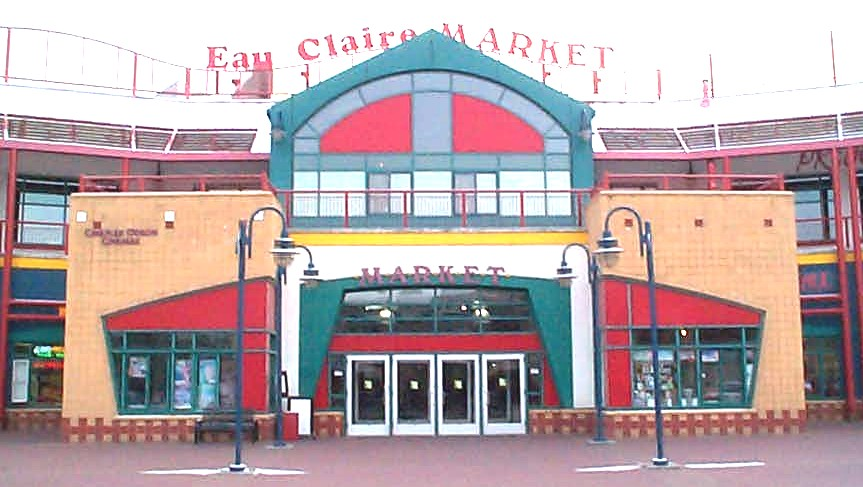
Eau Claire Market

Eau Claire Market was the focal point of the neighbourhood. It sat immediately south of the Bow River and was built on former industrial land. The mall was home to many shops and galleries, a six screen Cineplex Odeon multiplex, a food court and several restaurants. To coincide with the reconfiguration of Eau Claire Plaza, plans were in development in the mid-2010s to demolish and completely rebuild the market which had declined in popularity in recent years. The new market will likely cater to a larger and more diverse demographic to better serve the residential community at large. The redeveloped market will enclose the entrance to a proposed underground 2 Street SW Station, part of the Calgary Green Line. Taking design inspiration from the Central Library, the north end of the market will feature a tunnel portal integrated in the building, leading the CTrain to north-central Calgary via a new bridge over the Bow River. Construction of the station was expected to begin in 2024.

The Eau Claire Market was closed on May 31, 2024, and was demolished later that year.

== Crime ==
Crime Data
Year	Crime Rate (/100 pop.)
2018	6.6
2019	8.5
2020	3.3
2021	3.7
2022	3.7
2023	4.3
