= Copperfield, Calgary =

Copperfield
- Neighbourhood
- Location of Copperfield in Calgary
- Coordinates: 50°54′39″N 113°56′30″W
- Country: Canada
- Province: Alberta
- City: Calgary
- Quadrant: SE
- Ward: 12

Government
  - Mayor: Jeromy Farkas
  - Administrative body: Calgary City Council
  - Councillor: Mike Jamieson (A Better Calgary)
- Elevation: 1,030 m (3,380 ft)

Population (2011)
  - Total: 7,162
- Website: Copperfield-Mahogany Community Association

Copperfield is a neighbourhood in the southeast quadrant of Calgary, Alberta. The neighbourhood is bounded by 52nd St. to the west, Stoney Trail to the south, and the neighbourhood of New Brighton to the north.

It is represented in the Calgary City Council by the Ward 12 councillor.

Copperfield had a population of 7,162 in 2011.

== History ==
The community of Copperfield was launched in 2002 by Hopewell Residential Communities. Since that time the Copperfield community has grown to include approximately 4000 homes, including 2800 single family homes upon completion in 2006 over a 4-year period.

== Demographics ==
In the City of Calgary's 2012 municipal census, Copperfield had a population of 7,834 living in 3,043 dwellings, a 9.4% increase from its 2011 population of 7,162. With a land area of 4.4 km^{2} (1.7 sq mi), it had a population density of 1,780/km^{2} (4,610/sq mi) in 2012.

== See also ==
- List of neighbourhoods in Calgary
