= Mahogany, Calgary =

Suburban residential neighborhood in Calgary, Alberta, Canada

Mahogany
- Neighbourhood
- Location of Mahogany in Calgary
- Coordinates: 50.900°N 113.925°W
- Country: Canada
- Province: Alberta
- City: Calgary
- Quadrant: SE
- Ward: 12

Government
  - Mayor: Jeromy Farkas
  - Administrative body: Calgary City Council
  - Councillor: Mike Jamieson (A Better Calgary)

Mahogany is a suburban residential neighbourhood in Calgary, Alberta that was approved by its city council for development beginning in 2007. The community is bordered by 52 St SE to the west, along with the community of Auburn Bay, Stoney Trail to the north, the proposed East Freeway to the east, and an eastern extension of Seton Boulevard (dubbed 196 Avenue SE) to the south.

Mahogany is being developed by Hopewell Residential Communities of Calgary. The chosen builders within Mahogany include: Jayman, Sabal, Stepper Homes and Trico Homes. Calbridge, Baywest and Morrison Homes started building in Mahogany at the end of 2010. The Mahogany Sales Centre and Show Home Parade officially opened on Saturday September 13, 2008.

The area is represented in the Calgary City Council by the Ward 12 councillor.

According to page 22 of the city's Mahogany Community Plan, efforts are to be made to preserve a historic ranch located within the future community. A core commercial hub will be built along 52 Street on the west side, and a future southeast line of the city's C-Train system is expected to run parallel to 52 Street, also servicing Mahogany. The community is to the northeast of Seton, a commercial-residential-service hub that includes the city's new South Health Campus.

== Demographics ==
In the City of Calgary's 2019 municipal census, Mahogany had a population of 11,784 living in 4,507 dwellings, a significant growth from its 2011 population of 788. With a land area of 6.4 km^{2} (2.5 sq mi), it had a population density of 197.8/km^{2} (512/sq mi) in 2012.

== See also ==
- List of neighbourhoods in Calgary
