= Joane Cardinal-Schubert =

Canadian poet, painter

Dr. Joane Cardinal-Schubert LL.D (Hon), R.C.A.
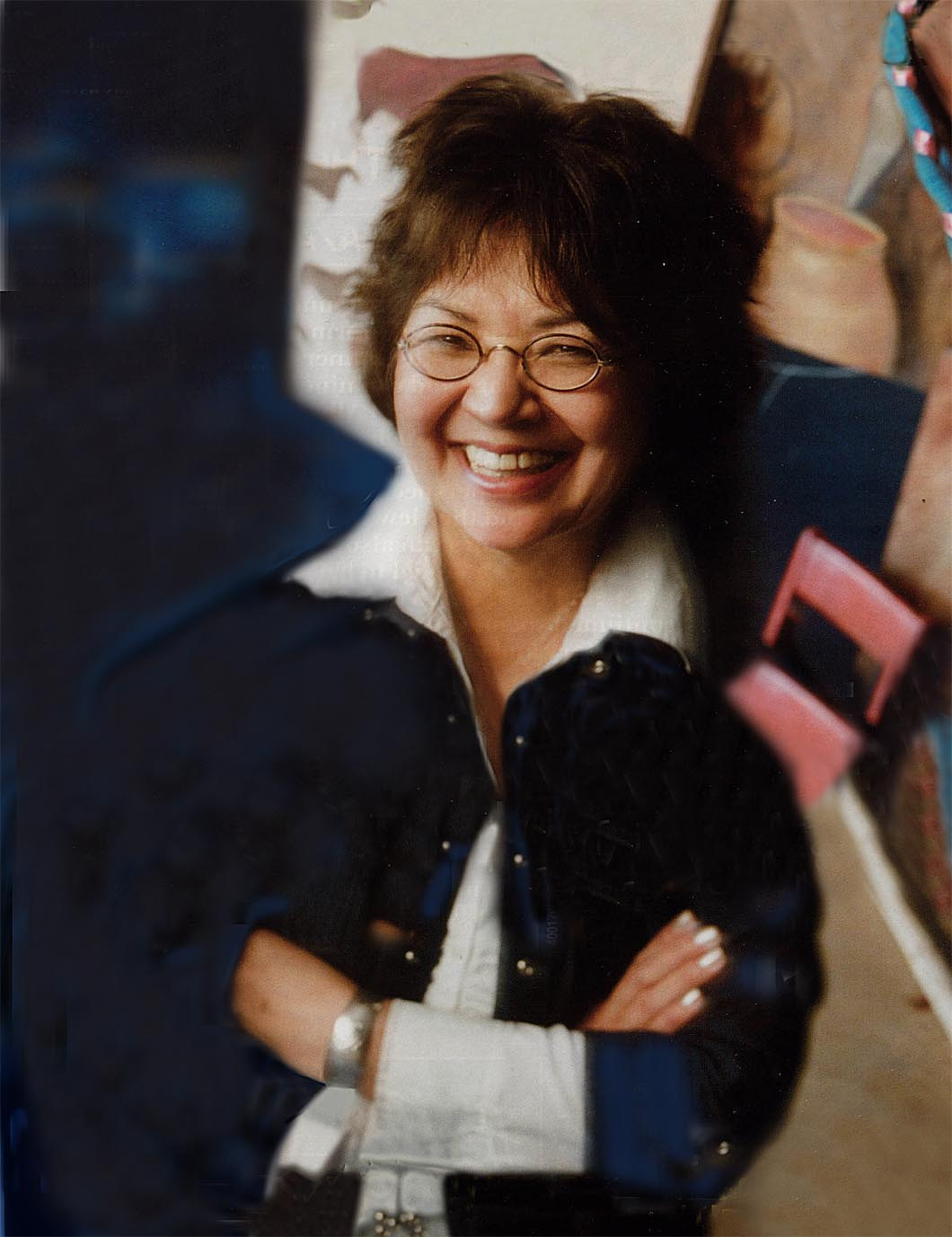
- Born: 1942; Red Deer, Alberta
- Died: 2009 (aged 66–67)
- Education: Alberta College of Art and Design, University of Alberta, University of Calgary
- Notable work: Drum Dancer "aka Prairie Pony", "Song of My Dream, Bed Dance"
- Style: Installation, Mixed media, Painting
- Awards: Honorary Doctor of Laws, University of Calgary

Joane Cardinal-Schubert RCA LL. D (Kainai, 1942–2009) was a First Nations artist from Alberta, Canada. She was a member of the Royal Canadian Academy of Arts. She was an activist for Native sovereignty.

== Early life ==
Cardinal-Schubert was born in 1942 in the town of Red Deer, Alberta. She attended the Alberta College of Art + Design (now Alberta University of the Arts) in 1962 where she studied painting, printmaking, and multimedia. Cardinal-Schubert's Indigenous culture was omitted from the education system, the media, history books, and arts. She focussed her work primarily on her family history and Kainaiwa ancestry.

== Education ==
In 1973 she began a B.A. at the University of Alberta before transferring to the University of Calgary to graduate with a B.F.A. in 1977. In 1978 Cardinal-Schubert worked as an assistant curator at the University of Calgary Art Gallery, and the Nickle Arts Museum (also in Calgary), from 1979 to 1985. Throughout her career her writings have been published internationally in art magazines, catalogues, and books.

== Artwork ==
Cardinal-Schubert's paintings and installations tell of her personal experiences which she weaves with social and historical events. Visually her work depicts valiant Indigenous motifs while communicating about subjects that affect and impact her. She takes up and revisits continuously issues of colonialism and the destruction of the environment throughout her work which at times reflects a 'collective Indian experience' while at other times producing work which is also informed by trends in Western avant-garde and contemporary art. When asked about her experience as an Indigenous artist she writes:

"I had a difficult time realizing I was categorized by my personal expressions. The categorization of Native Art was attached to my work and others' works by non-Native curators. Even though I had written the same exams in University and fulfilled all the requirements of a degree...when I got out of school my content which was largely about myself, who I was, my responses to the world etc. was labelled as Native Art and then political art - they seemed to go together. Later when Native Curators came on the scene, and called the work Native art - that was different. We were declaring who we were, not being told by others".

== Recognition ==
Cardinal-Schubert was the fourth woman to be admitted to the Royal Canadian Academy of Arts in 1985. In 1993 she received the Commemorative Medal of Canada and 2003 she was given as honorary doctorate of laws by her alma mata. In 2005 she was given the Queen's Golden Jubilee Medal. In 2007 the National Aboriginal Achievement Foundation, now Indspire, gave her their Art Award. On 30 June 2017, the Calgary Board of Education decided that a high school in the southeast community of Seton would be named in her honour. Trustee Amber Stewart stated in the announcement, "This is only the second high school in Calgary to be named after a woman. I am thrilled to recognize and honour the achievements and talents of a local woman, Joane Cardinal-Schubert."

== Heritage ==
Cardinal-Schubert was a member of the Kainai Nation. Also called the Káínawa, or Blood Tribe, a this First Nation in southern Alberta, Canada had a population of 12,800 (2015) and occupied approximately 549.7 square miles (884.6 km). They are part of the Niitsítapi or Blackfoot Confederacy. Historic Blackfoot territory extends from the Rocky Mountains to the West; the Sand Hills to the East; to the North Saskatchewan in the North, and the Yellowstone in the South.

The Kainai and their political, cultural, and economic allies the Peigan and Siksika make up the Blackfoot Confederacy. and are considered to be the oldest residents of the western prairie region The Bloods have created and maintained an attitude of independence and pride in their identity as Kainai which has allowed them to successfully resist the efforts of governments, churches, and other European agencies from enacting systems into traditions which could have resulted in a harmful and disadvantageous effect on legal rights and the cultural identity of the Kainai.

She helped create a space for Indigenous art in Canada and fought for the right of Native artists to be exhibited in galleries and museums. In 2009 she traveled the province of Alberta on behalf of the Alberta Foundation for the Arts to meet with Indigenous artists and identify work from the various stages of their careers not represented in the Foundation's collection, and to recommend purchases which directly benefited Indigenous artists and also made their work available for future generations.

Her pursuits as an activist, curator, and writer strive to highlight Indigenous history, culture and contemporary issues. In particular her installation and painting practice is known for its ability to elicit Indigenous experience while examining the unsolicited influence of Eurocentric educational, religious, and governmental systems.

Throughout her artistic practice she has focused on the discursive and physical divide between museum artifacts the communities they originated from while taking into account the historical conditions that gave way to the removal of those artifacts from their communities. Sick of the stereotyping of the Indigenous representation she saw in galleries, she decided to start creating things that 'have a metaphorical jump' where the viewer can understand Indigenous issues in terms they can relate to within their own culture. Her installation work Preservation of the Species, directly critiqued the Museums power and authority and the way those institutions handle Indigenous artifacts and systematically control their message.

== Listings of selected works ==
- Baptismal — The Convent Series, Medium: acrylic on canvas, Size: 40 × 40 inches

== Exhibitions ==
Cardinal-Schubert's exhibited her artwork nationally and internationally with over 26 solo exhibitions and numerous touring group exhibitions.

- Beyond History at the Vancouver Art Gallery (1989)
- INDIGENA: Perspectives of Indigenous Peoples on Five Hundred Years at the Canadian Museum of Civilization (1992)
- Joane Cardinal-Schubert: Two Decades at the Muttart Public Art Gallery, 9 October – 7 November 1997
- (Solo exhibit) Prairie Counter-plain - The Quilt Series, Masters Gallery Calgary Alberta 1997
- (Solo exhibit) Prairie Mask, Derek Simpkins Tribal Arts Gallery, Calgary Alberta 1997
- (Solo exhibit) Joane Cardinal-Schubert, Masters gallery. Calgary, Alberta 1994
- (Solo exhibit) Joane Cardinal-Schubert RCA, Imperial Oil Gallery, Museum of the Regiments, Calgary Alberta 1994
- (Solo exhibit) With Emily Carr (letters to Emily), Art Gallery of Greater Victoria, Victoria, BC 1994
- (Solo exhibit) Joane Cardinal-Schubert, Keepers Counting-group, Gallery of Tribal Art, Vancouver BC1994
- (Solo exhibit) Joane Cardinal-Schubert, Looking and Seeing, Gallery of Tribal Art, Vancouver, BC 1992
- (Solo exhibit) Birch Bark Letters to Emily Carr, Vik Gallery, Edmonton Alberta 1991
- (Solo exhibit) Joane Cardinal-Schubert, Inter-media Gallery, Minneapolis, Minnesota 1991
- (Solo exhibit) Letters to Ottawa... Oka... Oka...Aiiee!, Ufindi Gallery, Ottawa, Ontario 1991
- (Solo exhibit) Preservation of a Species: Cultural Currency, The Lesson, Articule Gallery. Montreal, Quebec 1990
- (Solo exhibit) Preservation of a Species: Deconstructionists, Ottawa School of Art Gallery, Ottawa, Ontario 1990
- (Solo exhibit) Joane Cardinal-Schubert, Meridian Gallery, San Francisco, California 1989
- (Solo exhibit) Joane Cardinal-Schubert - Preservation of a Species, 1987-88 Gulf Canada Square Gallery, Calgary, Alberta 1988
- (Solo exhibit) Preservation of a Species: Keeper, Muttart Public Gallery
