= Prince's Island Park (Calgary) =

Park in Calgary, Alberta, Canada

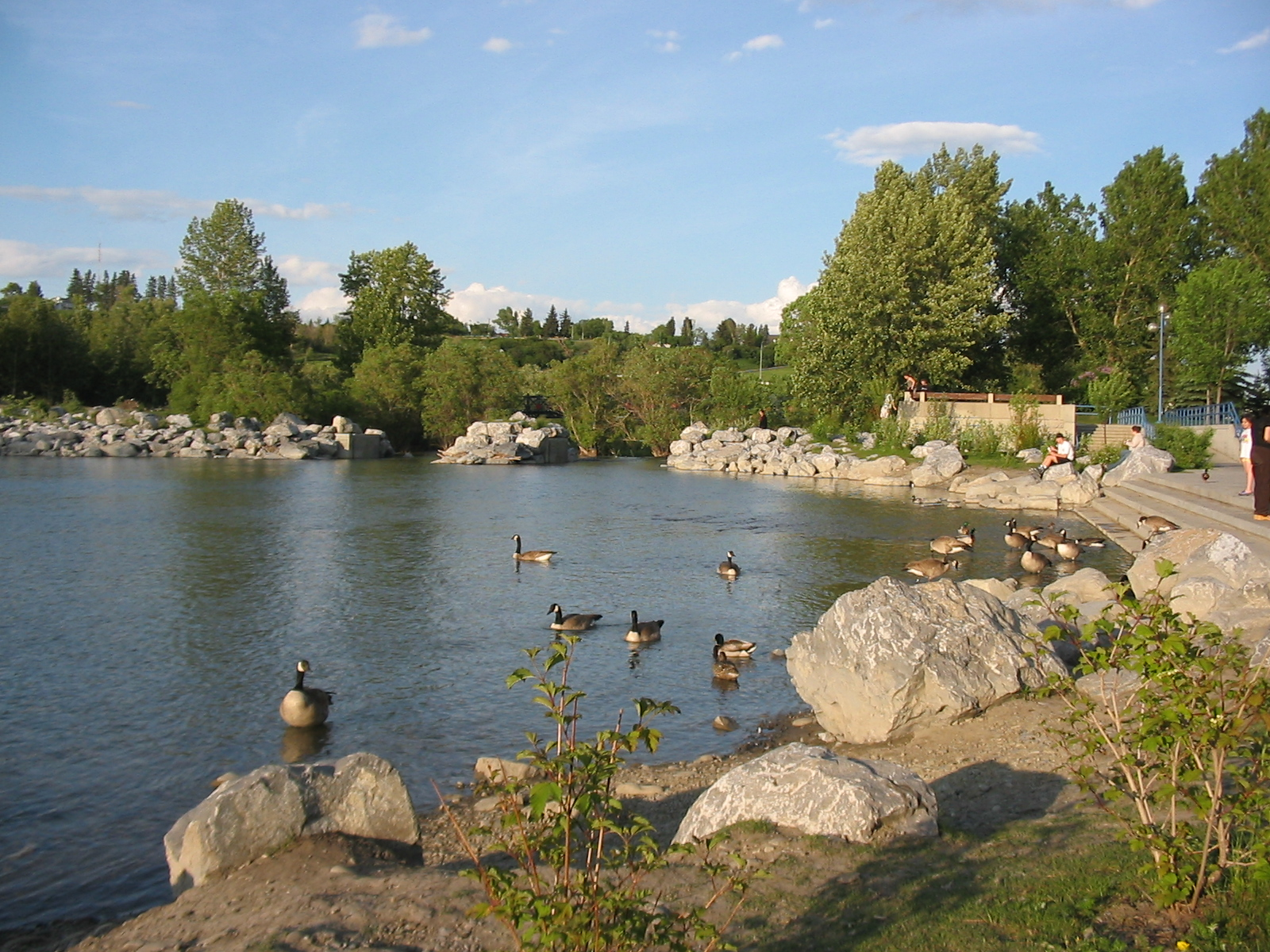
- The channel at Princes Island Park
- Interactive map of Prince's Island Park
- Type: Urban park
- Location: Calgary, Alberta
- Coordinates: 51°03′20″N 114°04′13″W
- Area: 49.5 acres (0.200 km^{2})
- Created: 1947
- Operator: City of Calgary

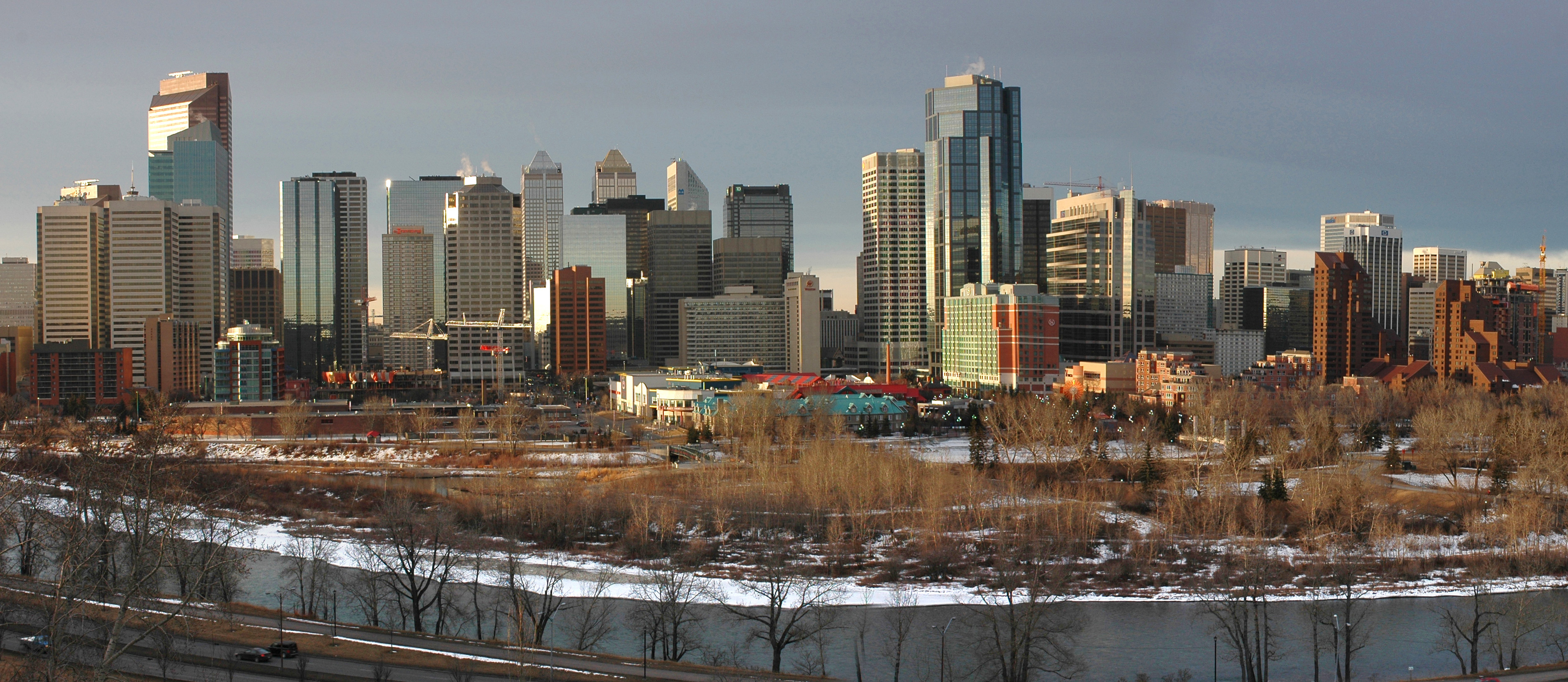
Bow River, Prince's Island Park and Downtown Calgary

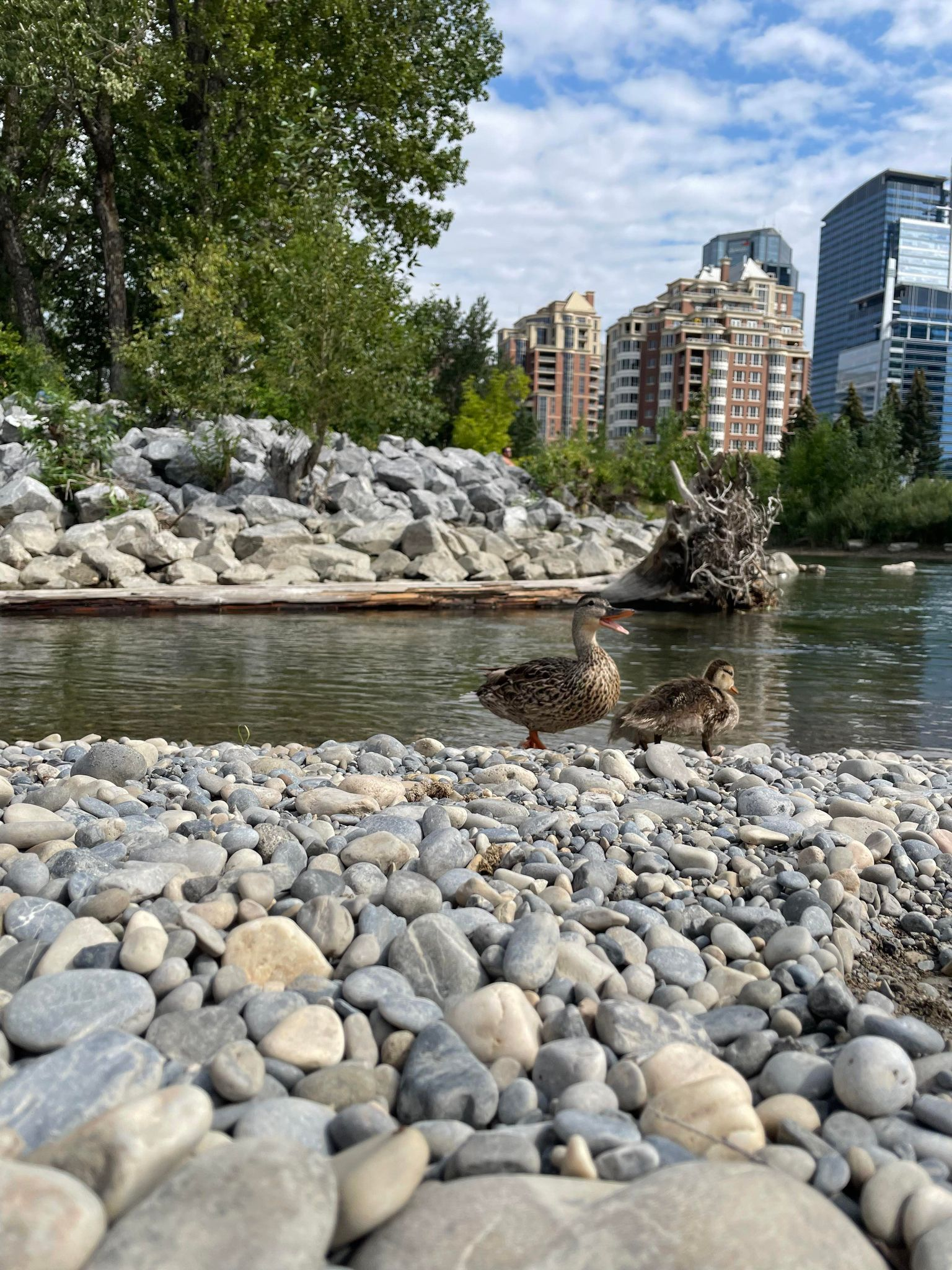
Prince's Island Park in 2022

Prince's Island Park is an urban park in the city of Calgary, Alberta, Canada. It is developed on an island on the Bow River, immediately north of downtown Calgary.

It was named after Peter Anthony Prince, the founder of the Eau Claire Lumber Mill. The park was built on land donated in 1947 to the city by the Prince family. It is often incorrectly referred to as "Princess Island Park". The park is open from 5 a.m. until 11 p.m. every regular day.

The island has a surface of 20 hectares and is linked by three bridges to Eau Claire and downtown Calgary and a north bridge to Memorial Drive and the community of Crescent Heights. It is part of the pathway and hiking trail system lining both sides of the Bow River. The southern arm of the river has been landscaped, while the eastern end of the island re-creates a wetland environment. Canada geese and mallard ducks are common birds found in the park.

== Transportation ==
Primary access to the island can be attained by a number of footbridges as part of the Bow River pathway and limited access is available to vehicles from the Prince's Island Causeway that connects to the corner of Eau Claire Ave and 6th Street and delivers traffic to the west end of the island. A limited number of parking stalls are available in the park. However vehicle access to the park is restricted during events.

== Festivals ==
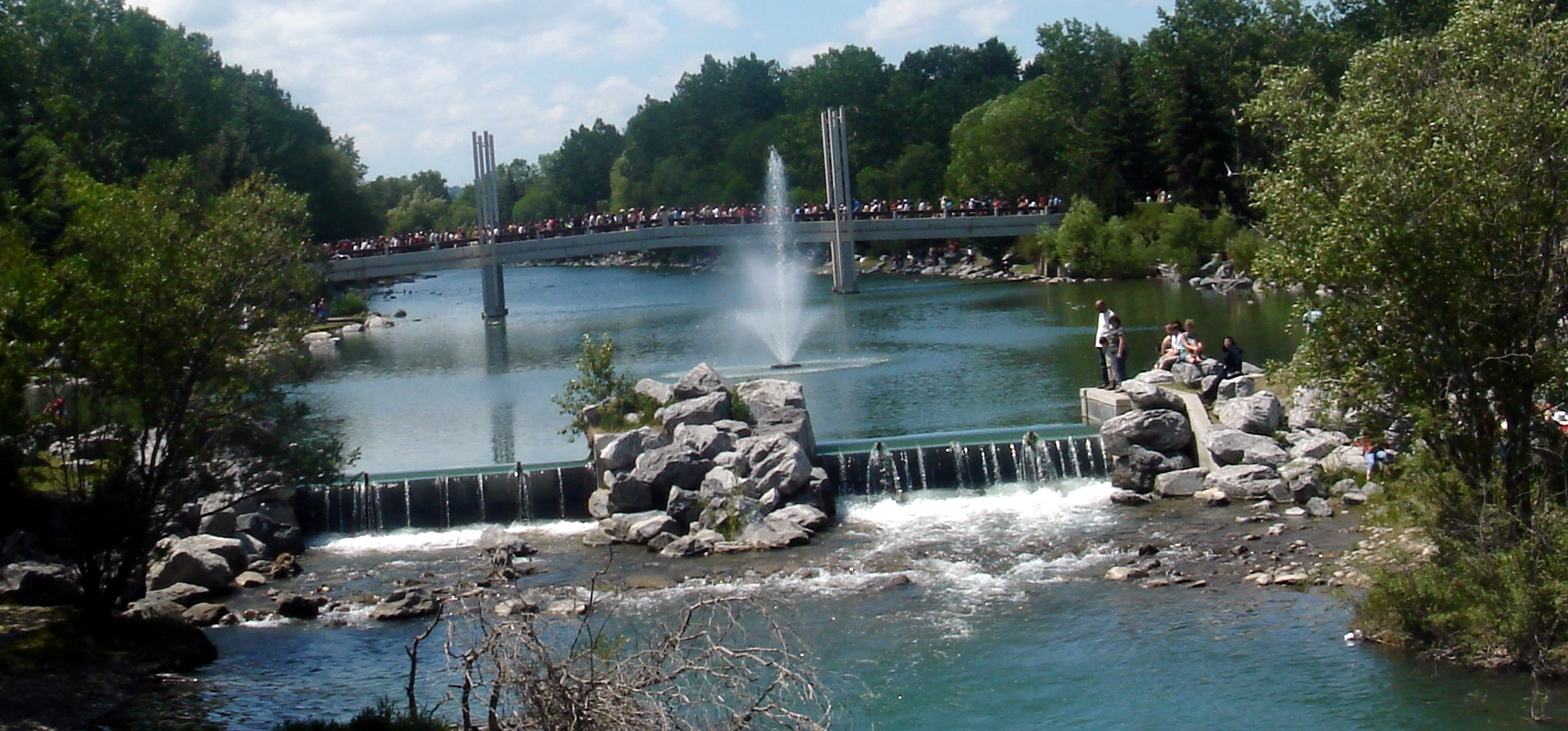
Crowded Jaipur Bridge during Canada Day celebrations

The park hosts many festivals, as well as busking events.

- Calgary Folk Music Festival
- Shakespeare in the Park
- Carifest
- Canada Day celebration
- Heritage Day celebration
- Afrikadey
- Expo Latino

About 150,000 visitors attended these festivals in 1996.

== See also ==
- List of attractions and landmarks in Calgary
- Edworthy Park
- Peacekeeper Park

== Gallery ==
Lawn in Prince's Island Park

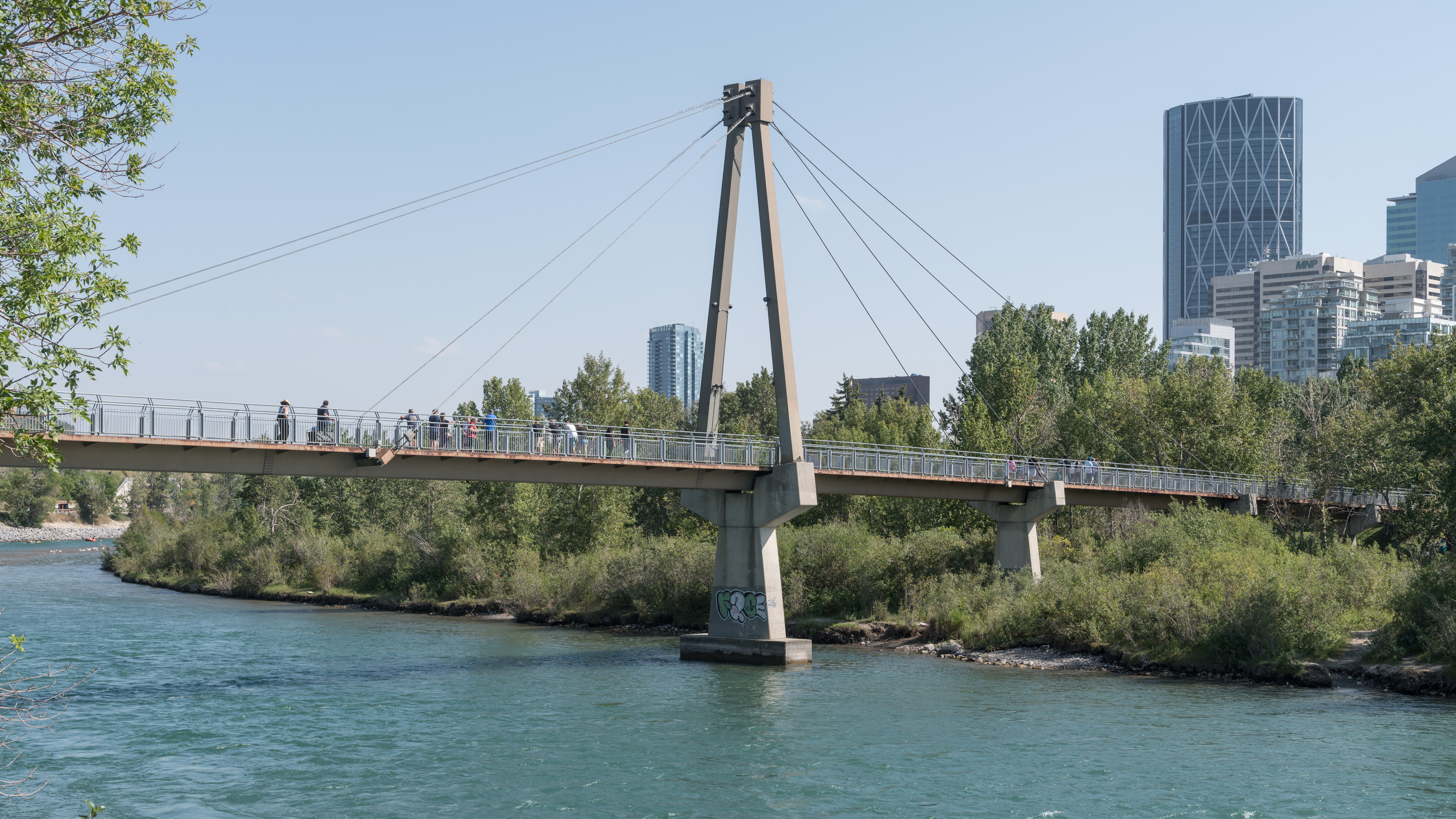
Princes Island Bridge to Memorial Drive and Sunnyside

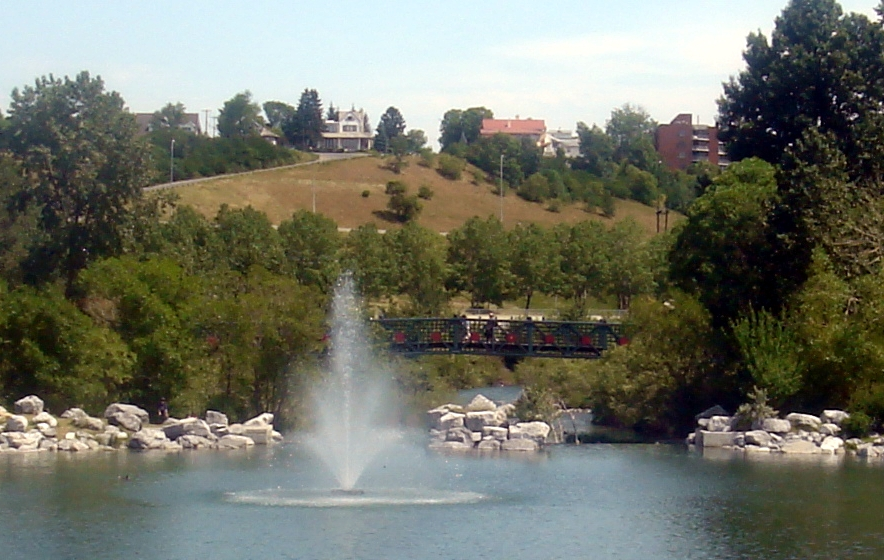
Bridge over Princes Island lagoon

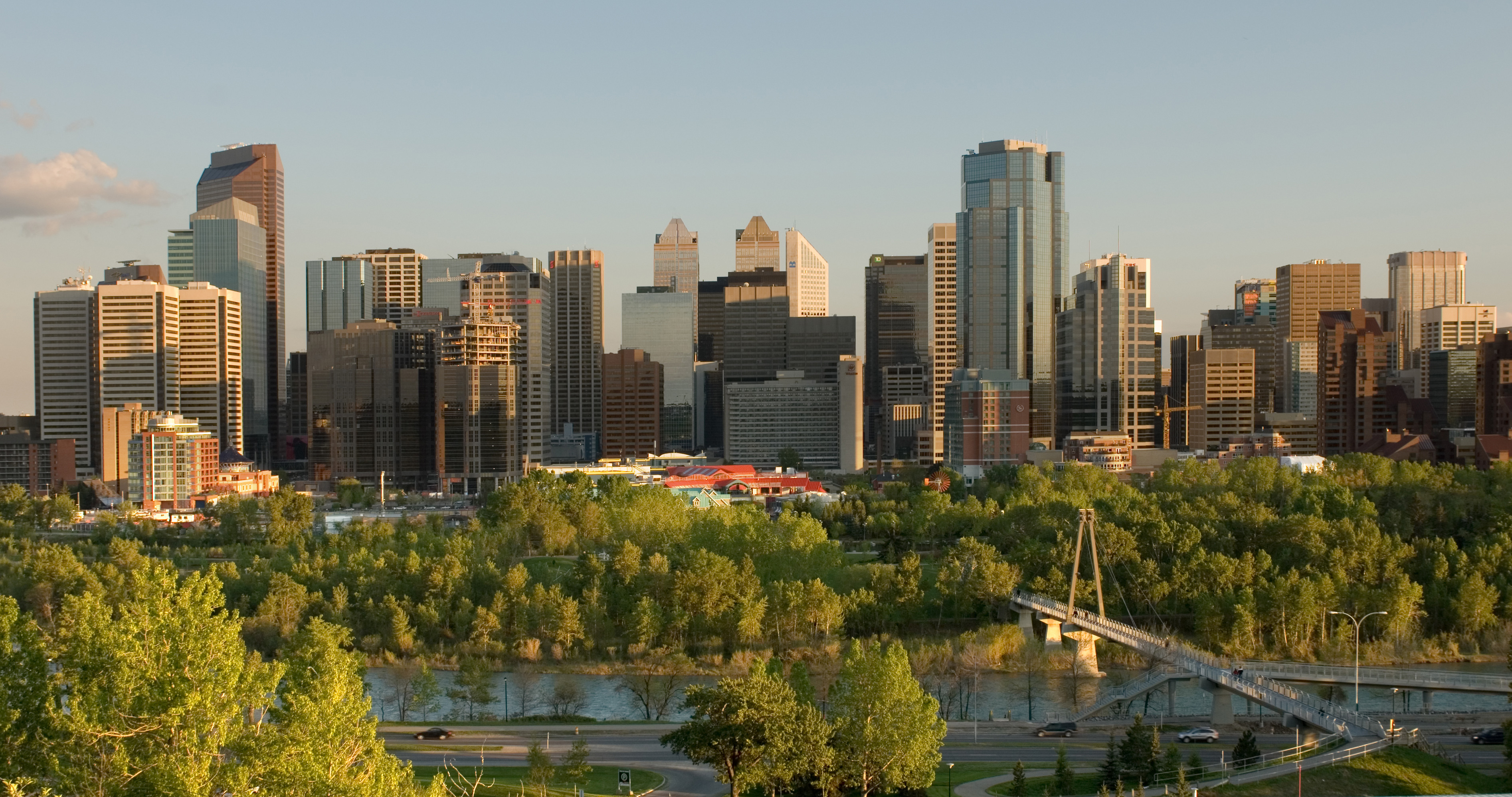
Park and Downtown Calgary
