= New Brighton, Calgary =

New Brighton
- Neighbourhood
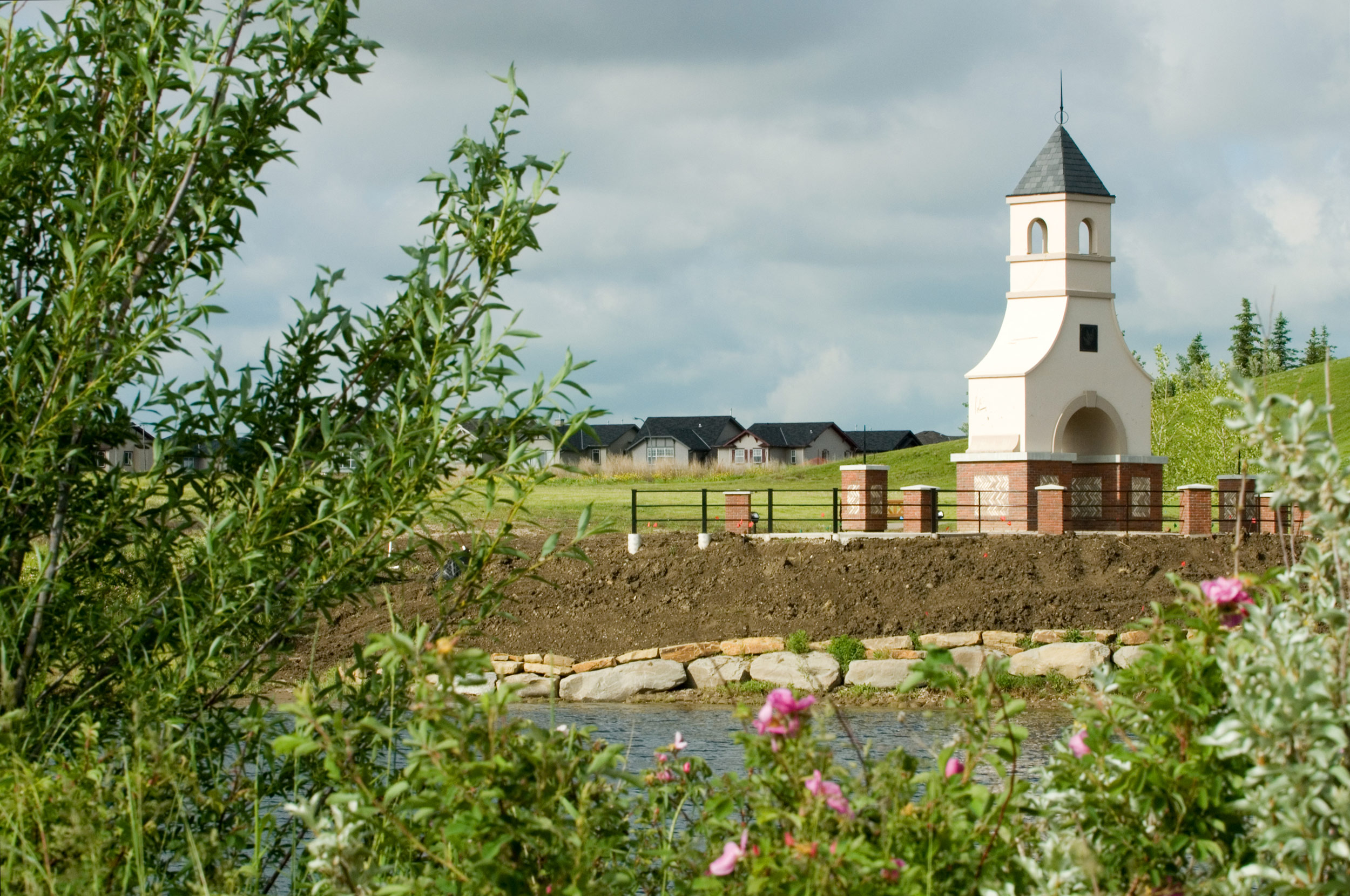
- The Bell Tower overlooking the lake at New Brighton

- Location of New Brighton in Calgary
- Coordinates: 50°55′17″N 113°57′09″W
- Country: Canada
- Province: Alberta
- City: Calgary
- Quadrant: SE
- Ward: 12

Government
  - Mayor: Jeromy Farkas
  - Administrative body: Calgary City Council
  - Councillor: Mike Jamieson (A Better Calgary)
- Elevation: 1,030 m (3,380 ft)

Population (2011)
  - Total: 7,314
- Website: New Brighton Community Association

New Brighton is a master–planned residential neighbourhood developed in the southeast of Calgary, Alberta. Located east of 52nd Street SE and south of 130th Ave and McIvor Boulevard to the south. The community contains a variety of single family and multi-family homes as well as a private residents' association recreation facility called the New Brighton Club. The facility contains a water park, hockey rink, tennis courts, banquet facilities and studio space with many programmed activities.

The community was designed by Carma Developers LP. It is represented in the Calgary City Council by the Ward 12 councillor.

== Demographics ==
In the City of Calgary's 2012 municipal census, New Brighton had a population of 8,303 living in 3,247 dwellings, a 13.5% increase from its 2011 population of 7,314. With a land area of 2.9 km^{2} (1.1 sq mi), it had a population density of 2,860/km^{2} (7,420/sq mi) in 2012.

== Transportation ==
New Brighton is connected to other parts of Calgary through Calgary Transit bus routes and major roadways. residents can access downtown Calgary using express transit services, while Deerfoot Trail and Glenmore Trail provide convenient road connections across the city. these transportation options help connect the community to employment areas, educational institutions, and other services throughout Calgary.

== See also ==
- List of neighbourhoods in Calgary

Population as of 2011 is 7314 with an increase of 172.9% from 2007 - 2011
