= Auburn Bay, Calgary =

Area of Calgary, Alberta, Canada

Auburn Bay
- Neighbourhood
- Location of Auburn Bay in Calgary
- Coordinates: 50°53′35″N 113°57′28″W
- Country: Canada
- Province: Alberta
- City: Calgary
- Quadrant: SE
- Ward: 12

Government
  - Mayor: Jeromy Farkas
  - Administrative body: Calgary City Council
  - Councillor: Mike Jamieson (A Better Calgary)

Auburn Bay is a suburban residential neighbourhood in the southeast quadrant of Calgary, Alberta. It is located at the southeastern edge of the city, and is bounded by Seton Boulevard to the south, Deerfoot Trail to the west, 52 Street E to the east and Stoney Trail to the north. It was established in 2005.

The South Health Campus hospital and the mixed use town centre development of Seton is located immediately to the south of the community. The Green Line of the CTrain will run along the community's eastern boundary, parallel to 52 Street.

Auburn Bay has a Residents Association and a Community Association.

It is represented in the Calgary City Council by the Ward 12 councillor.

A community containing to over 5400 houses. Auburn Bay Community is home to five schools: Auburn Bay K-4 & Prince of Peace K-9, St. Gianna Catholic School K-6, Bayside School K-5, and Lakeshore School 5–9. 15 playgrounds, an off leash dog park, Auburn Station commercial mall, future home to LRT transit, walking/cycling trails, 2 baseball fields, 2 large soccer fields, 2 ponds and a lake.

Auburn Bay is also very well known in Calgary for its Halloween spirit. Each Year, many houses create big Halloween displays, including garage haunted houses, light shows and yards filled with inflatables. Some residents also hand out 2L pops, or shots for adults. The community also puts on its very own haunted house in its community center. There was also a street that used to close on Halloween every year and would bring in food trucks and have a big event, but that was shut down in 2024 due to complaints.

Each year the community also puts on an end of summer fire works show. In 2024 they even added synchronized music to the show.

== Demographics ==
As of the 2021 Calgary municipal census, Auburn Bay had a population of 18,090, living in 6,245 dwellings. With a land area of 4.5 km^{2} (1.7 sq mi), it had a population density of 4,020/km^{2} (10,410/sq mi) in 2021.

Residents in Auburn Bay had a median household income of $125,000 in 2021, and 5% of residents were low-income. As of 2021, 26% of residents were immigrants, 19% of housing were condominiums or apartment, and 25% of housing were rentals. 22% of Auburn Bay residents spent 30%+ of their income on housing, compared to the Calgary average of 23%.

== See also ==
- List of neighbourhoods in Calgary
