= Lord Beaverbrook High School =

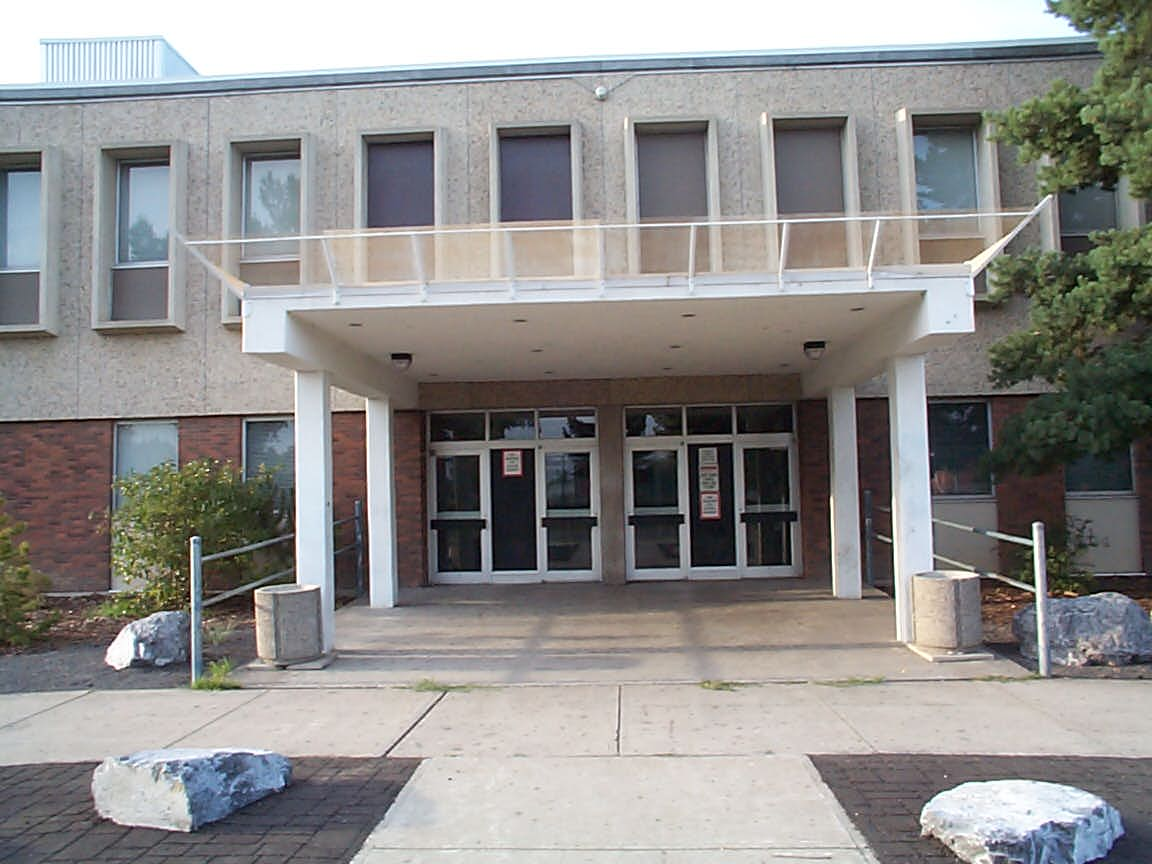

Location
- 9019 Fairmount Drive N.W. Calgary, Alberta; Canada; 50.9728°N 114.0610°W

Information
- Type: Public
- Motto: Motto: Omni pro sua parte (Latin for: Everything to the best of one's ability)
- Established: 1967
- School board: Calgary Board of Education
- Principal: David Sparrow
- Grades: 10–12
- Enrollment: 1552 (2022)
  - Grade 10: ~770
  - Grade 11: ~690
  - Grade 12: ~580
- Campus: Urban
- Communities served: Acadia, Deer Run, Diamond Cove, Douglasdale/Douglasglen, Fairview, Maple Ridge, McKenzie Lake, McKenzie Towne, Quarry Park, Queensland, Willow Park, Parkland, New Brighton
- Feeder schools: David Thompson. McKenzie Highlands. Mountain Park. RT Alderman. Wilma Hansen. Fairview. Dr Martha Cohen
- Website: schools.cbe.ab.ca/b850/

Lord Beaverbrook High School (LBHS) is a public high school in Calgary, Alberta, Canada operated by the Calgary Board of Education. It was founded in 1967 and the first year of attendance was in 1968. It has approximately 2200 students, ~770 of which are in 10th grade and 100 staff members. It is named after Max Aitken, Lord Beaverbrook. The school's mascot is a "Lord"—a black, silver, and white lion wearing a crown.

The school is part of the Action for Bright Children Society.

== Notable alumni ==
- Andy Ta, professional League of Legends player.
- Don Cairns, former National Hockey League player.
- Tommy Campbell, actor, stand-up comedian and comedy writer/director
- Graham Clark, podcaster and stand-up comedian
- Randy Gingera, former professional volleyball player, 1992 Canadian Olympian
- Owen Hargreaves, former professional footballer for Bayern Munich, Manchester United, and Manchester City F.C.
- Tim Hunter, former National Hockey League player
- Stu Laird, former Canadian Football League player
- Lisa Lobsinger, vocalist for the band Reverie Sound Revue and Broken Social Scene
- Jeff Pain, Olympic Silver medallist
- Patricia Relf, author
- Chris Robanske, Olympian (2014, 2018) and former Canadian Snowboard Federation.
- Mark Tewksbury, Canadian gold medalist swimmer and actor
- Robert Thirsk, CSA astronaut
- Kent Warnock, former Canadian Football League player.
