= Lake Bonavista, Calgary =

Lake Bonavista
- Neighbourhood
- Location of Lake Bonavista in Calgary
- Coordinates: 50°56′31″N 114°02′40″W
- Country: Canada
- Province: Alberta
- City: Calgary
- Quarant: SE
- Ward: 14
- Established: 1967

Government
  - Mayor: Jeromy Farkas
  - Administrative body: Calgary City Council
  - Councillor: Landon Johnston (Independent)
- Elevation: 1,035 m (3,396 ft)

Population (2006)
  - Total: 10,381
  - Average Income: $101,025
- Website: Lake Bonavista Community Association

Lake Bonavista is a neighbourhood in Southeast Calgary, Alberta, Canada. It is located in the Southeast quadrant of Calgary.

Lake Bonavista is not to be confused with Bonavista Downs, which sits directly to the east of the community. These two communities are listed as distinct identities from one-another by the City of Calgary.

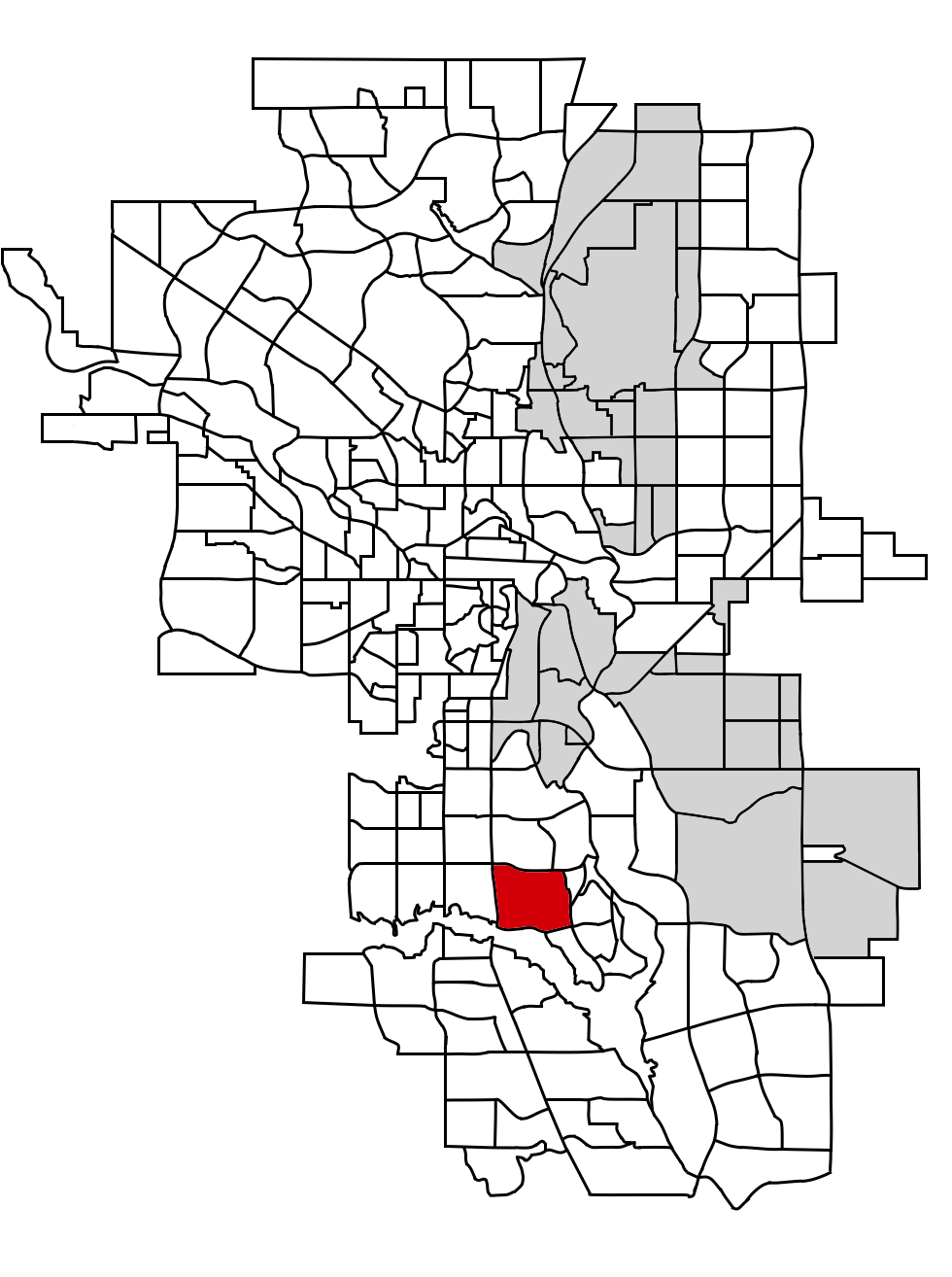
Location of Lake Bonavista on the City of Calgary map

== History ==
Lake Bonavista was developed by the Keith Construction company starting in 1967. It was the first community in Canada to be built around a man-made lake, and served as a prototype for other lake communities in Calgary.

Two trailer courts were on the west side of Bonavista, north of the Avenida Shopping Centre, alongside Macleod Trail. The Avenida shopping centre, opened in 1988, was built to cater to the increasing size of the neighbourhood. It includes an art gallery and assorted upmarket restaurants.

== Community boundaries ==
The community of Lake Bonavista is located in the southeast quadrant of Calgary. It is bounded by Anderson Road to the north, Macleod Trail to the west, Canyon Meadows Drive to the south, and a natural existing hill to the east. Willow Park sits directly to the north of the community, Canyon Meadows to the west, Fish Creek Provincial Park and Parkland to the south, and Bonavista Downs to the east.

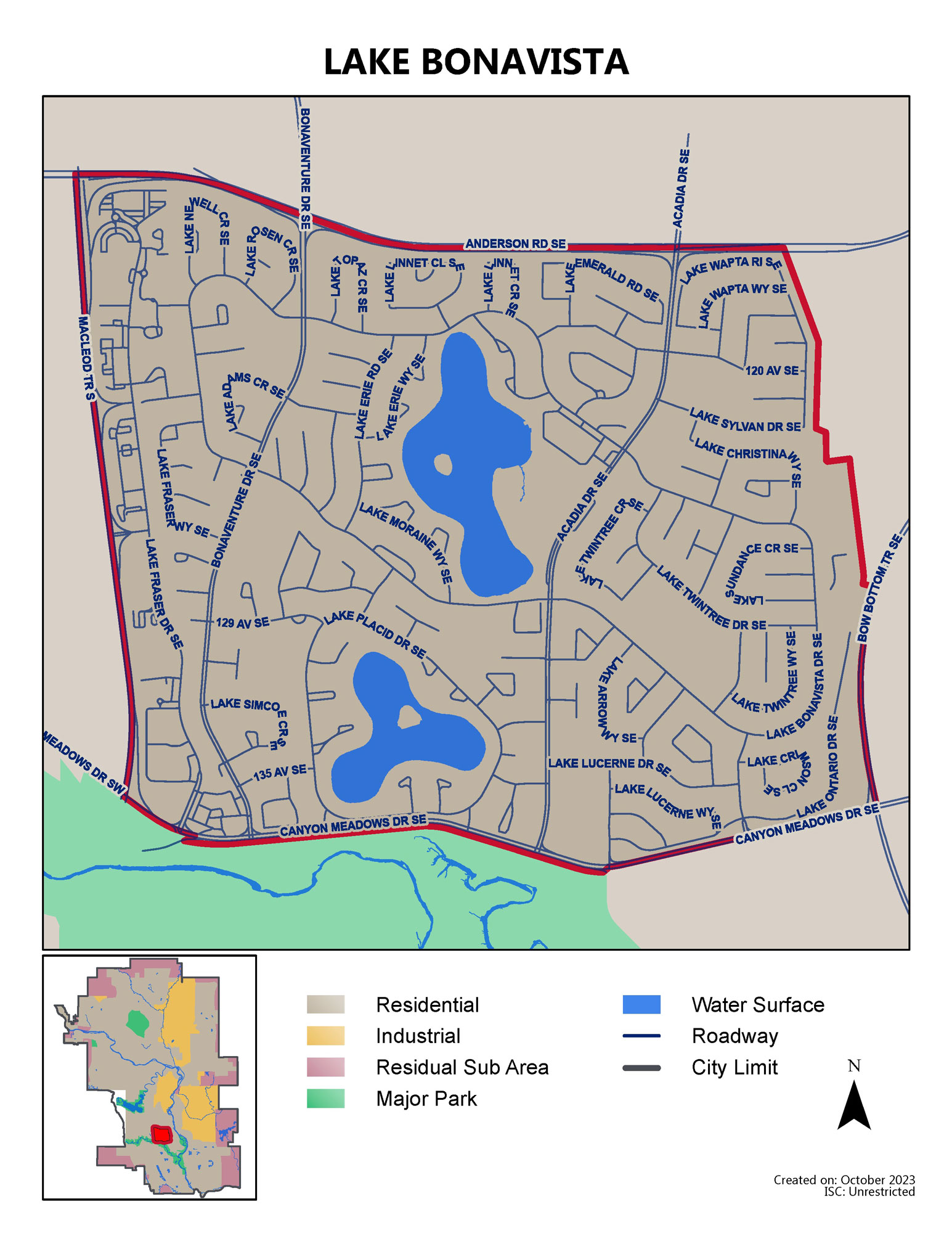
Map of the community boundaries of Lake Bonavista, according to the City of Calgary

== Demographics ==
In the City of Calgary's 2012 municipal census, Lake Bonavista had a population of 10,475 living in 4,106 dwellings, a 1.3% decrease from its 2011 population of 10,610. With a land area of 5.2 km^{2} (2.0 sq mi), it had a population density of 2,014/km^{2} (5,220/sq mi) in 2012. Also in the 2012 municipal census, Bonavista Downs had a population of 925 living in 370 dwellings, a 2.3% decrease from its 2011 population of 947. With a land area of 0.5 km^{2} (0.19 sq mi), it had a population density of 1,850/km^{2} (4,800/sq mi) in 2012.

Residents in this community had a median household income of $101,025 in 2005, and there were 4.4% low income residents living in the neighbourhood. In Bonavista Downs, the median household income was $81,761, and there were 8.4% low income residents living in the neighbourhood.

Pop. Overtime
Year	Population
2014	10502
2015	10529
2016	10478
2017	10419
2018	10292
2019	10293
2021	10145

== Amenities ==
Lake Bonavista Promenade is a small commercial development within Lake Bonavista that includes both retail space and professional offices. There is convenient access to shopping areas along Macleod Trail and in Southcentre Mall.

Fish Creek Park borders the community to the south, and provides a variety of outdoor recreation opportunities.

The Lake Bonavista Community Association (not to be confused with the homeowners association which maintains the lake) owns a community centre within the district. The centre includes two ice rinks, a gym, and a variety of multipurpose rooms.

There is also a City of Calgary ice rink, Frank McCool Arena, within the community.

=== Manmade Lakes ===
The area was originally flat treeless prairie with no distinctive natural features. In order to make the area more attractive, Lake Bonavista, a 52-acre (210,000 m^{2}) manmade lake, was constructed in 1968, with a portion of the earth excavated from the lake used to construct a 65-foot (20 m) hill with a waterfall adjacent to the lake. The lake and park provide a variety of year-round recreational opportunities for residents, including fishing, swimming, boating, tennis, skating, and tobogganing. The Lake Bonavista Homeowners Association, membership of which is mandatory for homeowners in the area, provides for the upkeep of the lake and park.

The neighbourhood also contains a second manmade lake, Lake Bonaventure. This 35-acre (140,000 m^{2}) lake is only accessible from houses built directly around the lake itself. Homeowners with access to Lake Bonaventure must pay their share of the upkeep on both Lake Bonavista and Lake Bonaventure.

Bonavista Downs residents share many of the amenities with Lake Bonavista, but they do not have access to the lakes and do not pay for their upkeep.

== Education ==
Lake Bonavista is home to the following schools:

- Lake Bonavista, Public Elementary
- Andrew Sibbald, Public Elementary
- Sam Livingston, Public Elementary
- Nickle, Public Junior High
- St. Boniface, Catholic Elementary
- St. Bonaventure, Catholic Junior High

== Churches ==
The following churches are located in Lake Bonavista:

- Bonavista Baptist Church
- Bonavista Church (formerly Bonavista Evangelical Missionary Church)
- Holy Nativity Anglican Church
- St. Bonaventure Church

== Transit ==
Lake Bonavista is served by Calgary Transit Bus Route 29 to the north, Route 35 in the middle, and Route 83 in the south. The Canyon Meadows CTrain Station serves Lake Bonavista.

== Electoral districts ==
Lake Bonavista is part of the Calgary Midnapore Federal Electoral District, the Calgary Fish Creek Provincial Riding, and Calgary Municipal Ward 14.

== See also ==
- List of neighbourhoods in Calgary
