= Fish Creek–Lacombe station =

Light rail station in Calgary, Alberta, Canada

Fish Creek–Lacombe
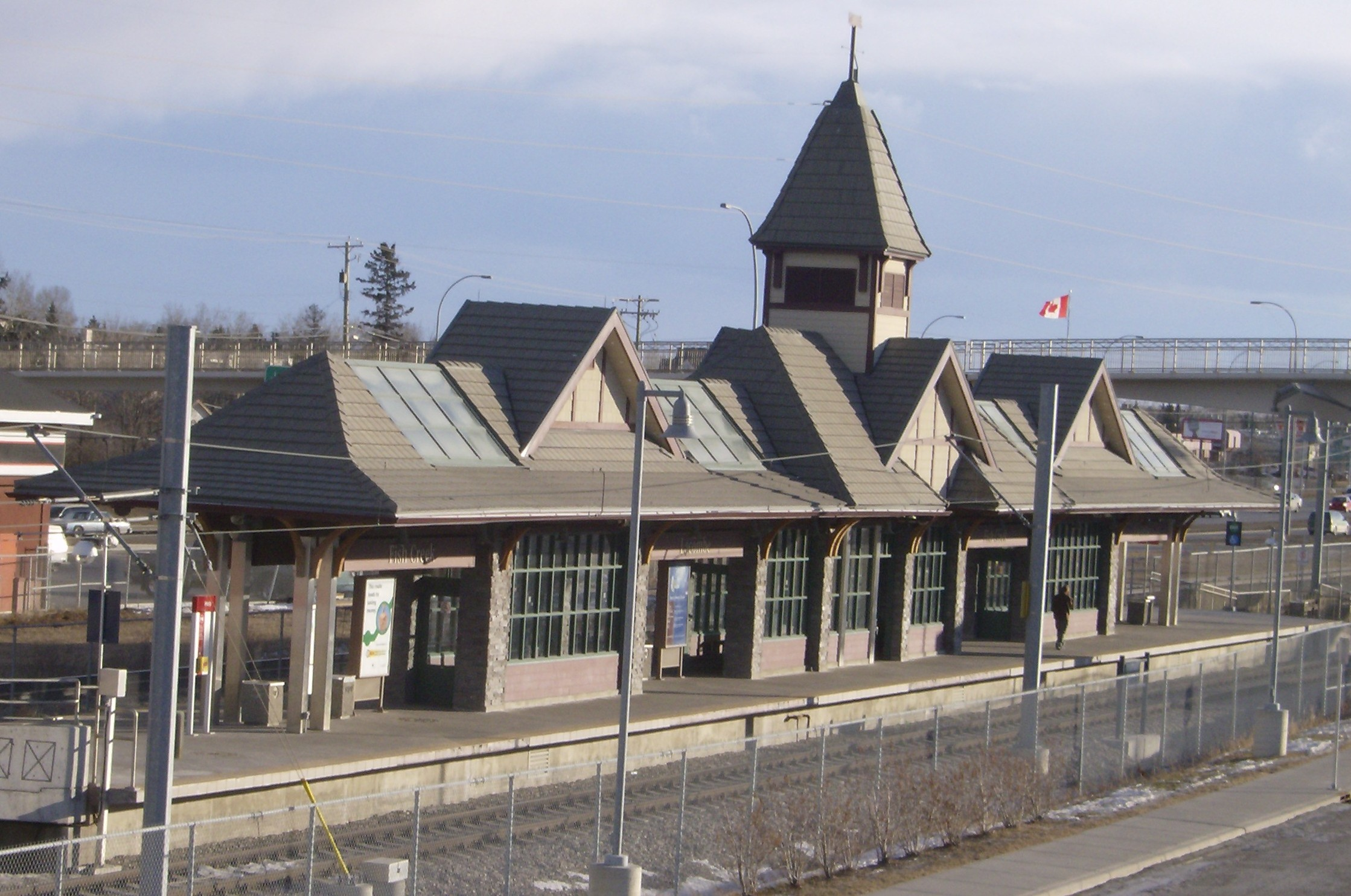

General information
- Location: 14300 Shawnee Gate SW
- Coordinates: 50°55′23″N 114°04′23″W
- Owner: Calgary Transit
- Platforms: Center platform
- Connections: 11 Southwest Loop; 12 Southwest Loop; 52 Evergreen/Somerset; 63 Alpine Park

Construction
- Structure type: At-grade
- Parking: 1,130 spaces
- Accessible: yes

History
- Opened: 2001; 25 years ago
- Rebuilt: 2012; 14 years ago (platform extension)

Services
Preceding station	Calgary Transit	Following station
Canyon Meadows toward Tuscany	Red Line	Shawnessy toward Somerset–Bridlewood
Location

Fish Creek–Lacombe station is a CTrain light rail station in the Calgary, Alberta community of which opened October 9, 2001 as part of the South LRT Extension Phase I and was the southern terminus until June 27, 2004. It serves the South Line (Route 201). It is located on the exclusive LRT right of way (adjacent to CPR ROW), 14.2 km (8.8 mi) south of the City Hall interlocking. The station is west of MacLeod Trail and just to the north of James McKevitt Road.

The station has a center-loading platform with barrier-free access at both ends. The North end connects to the heated indoor ticket pavilion and the bus loop. The south end connects to the park and ride lot as well as the pedestrian overpass that connects Fish Creek Provincial Park and Midnapore to the LRT station. A large 1130 space park-and-ride lot is located on site.

The station platform was originally constructed to 3-car length with room set aside to easily expand to 4-car length when needed in the future. Construction on a Southern extension of the platform started on July 16, 2012, and the new platform extension and relocated track crossing opened on December 15, 2012.

In 2005, the station registered an average of 6,200 boardings per weekday.

== History ==
In February 2024, a proposal was proposed for the Fish Creek-Lacombe Station to be renamed to 'Fish Creek-St. Mary's Station' after the nearby St. Mary's University.

== Around the station ==
=== Major destinations ===
- Father Lacombe Care Centre
- Fish Creek Provincial Park
- Shawnee Common (mixed-use development)
- Shawnee Station (shopping plaza)
- St. Mary's University
- The Manor Village / Highbury Tower Residences

=== Communities ===
Residential

- Evergreen
- Midnapore
- Millrise
- Shawnee Slopes

Other

- Fish Creek Park

=== Major streets ===
- Bannister Rd
- James McKevitt Rd
- Macleod Trail
- Providence Blvd / 146 Avenue SE
- Shawnee Blvd
- Shawnee Common

== Transit connections ==
Bus connections to Fish Creek–Lacombe station as of 31 August, 2026:

- 11 - Southwest Loop (Clockwise)
- 12 - Southwest Loop (Counterclockwise)
- 52 - Somerset-Bridlewood (South)
- 63 - Alpine Park (West)

== See also ==
- CTrain
- Red Line (Calgary)
- Canyon Meadows station
- Fish Creek Provincial Park
- St. Mary's University (Calgary)
- Evergreen, Calgary
- Midnapore, Calgary
- Shawnee Slopes, Calgary
