= McKenzie Lake, Calgary =

McKenzie Lake Mack Lake
- Neighbourhood
- Location of McKenzie Lake in Calgary
- Coordinates: 50°54′28″N 113°59′14″W
- Country: Canada
- Province: Alberta
- City: Calgary
- Quadrant: SE
- Ward: 14
- Established: 1982

Government
  - Mayor: Jeromy Farkas
  - Administrative body: Calgary City Council
  - Councillor: Landon Johnston (Independent)

Area
  - Total: 3.9 km^{2} (1.5 sq mi)
- Elevation: 1,035 m (3,396 ft)

Population (2011)
  - Total: 14,062
  - Average Income: $87,291
- Website: McKenzie Lake Community Association

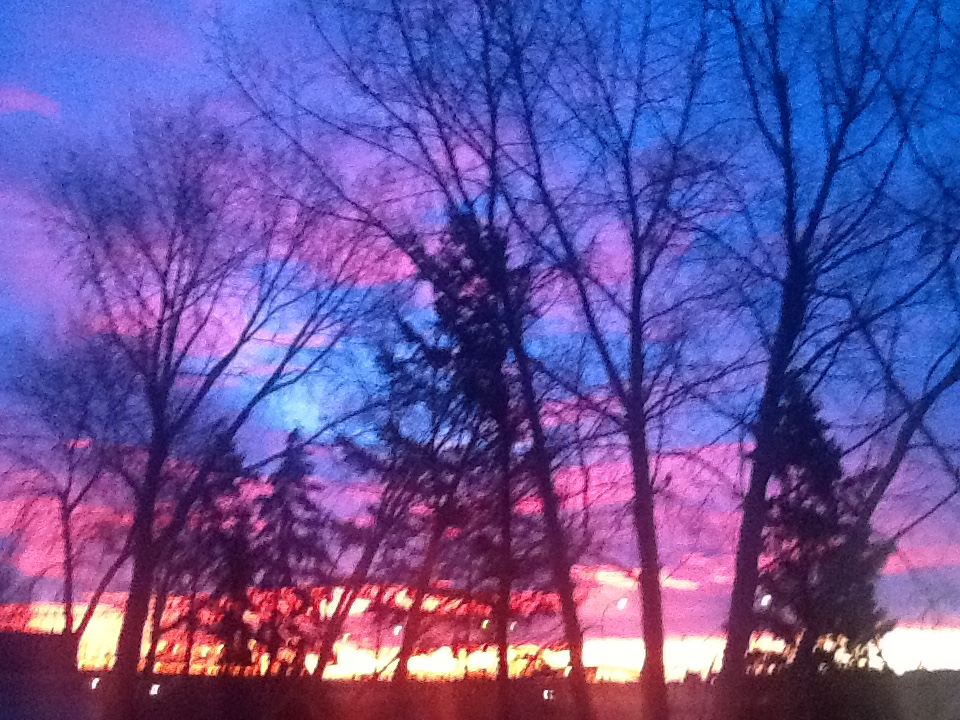
A sunrise in McKenzie Lake

McKenzie Lake is a residential neighbourhood in southeast Calgary, Alberta. The community was in development from the mid-1980s through to present. The area is bordered by Deerfoot Trail on the east, Stoney Trail on the south, Fish Creek Provincial Park on the west, and 130th Ave SE on the north. The community is most known for its private lake and island in the centre of the community. Multimillion-dollar homes can be seen along both the ridge and the lake. The community centre is home to an ice rink. Basketball courts, and tennis courts.

== History ==
The original community of McKenzie was built in 1984 south of Stonegate. During the mid-1990s, when town of Midnapore was annexed into the city of Calgary proper, interest in city's deep south began to peak. McKenzie Lake developed as an expansion of the former McKenzie community after an artificial lake was produced in response to the popularity of similar amenities in communities such as Lake Bonavista.

The community was expanded again in 1997 when Legacy Ridge was developed in a belt of agriculture land that separated McKenzie from McKenzie Lake, thus unifying the two areas.

== Demographics ==
In the City of Calgary's 2012 municipal census, McKenzie Lake had a population of 14,050 living in 4,653 dwellings, a -0.1% increase from its 2011 population of 14,062. With a land area of 5.1 km^{2} (2.0 sq mi), it had a population density of 2,755/km^{2} (7,140/sq mi) in 2012.

Residents in this community had a median household income of $97,291 in 2000, and there were 7.8% low income residents living in the neighbourhood. As of 2000, 14.2% of the residents were immigrants. Most buildings were single-family detached homes, and 6.3% of the housing was used for renting.

== Education ==
This neighbourhood includes two public schools: McKenzie Lake Elementary School (K-4) and Mountain Park Middle School (6-9, formerly 5-9); and one separate school, Cardinal Newman School (K-9).

== See also ==
- List of neighbourhoods in Calgary
