= Anderson station (Calgary) =

Light rail station in Calgary, Alberta, Canada

Anderson
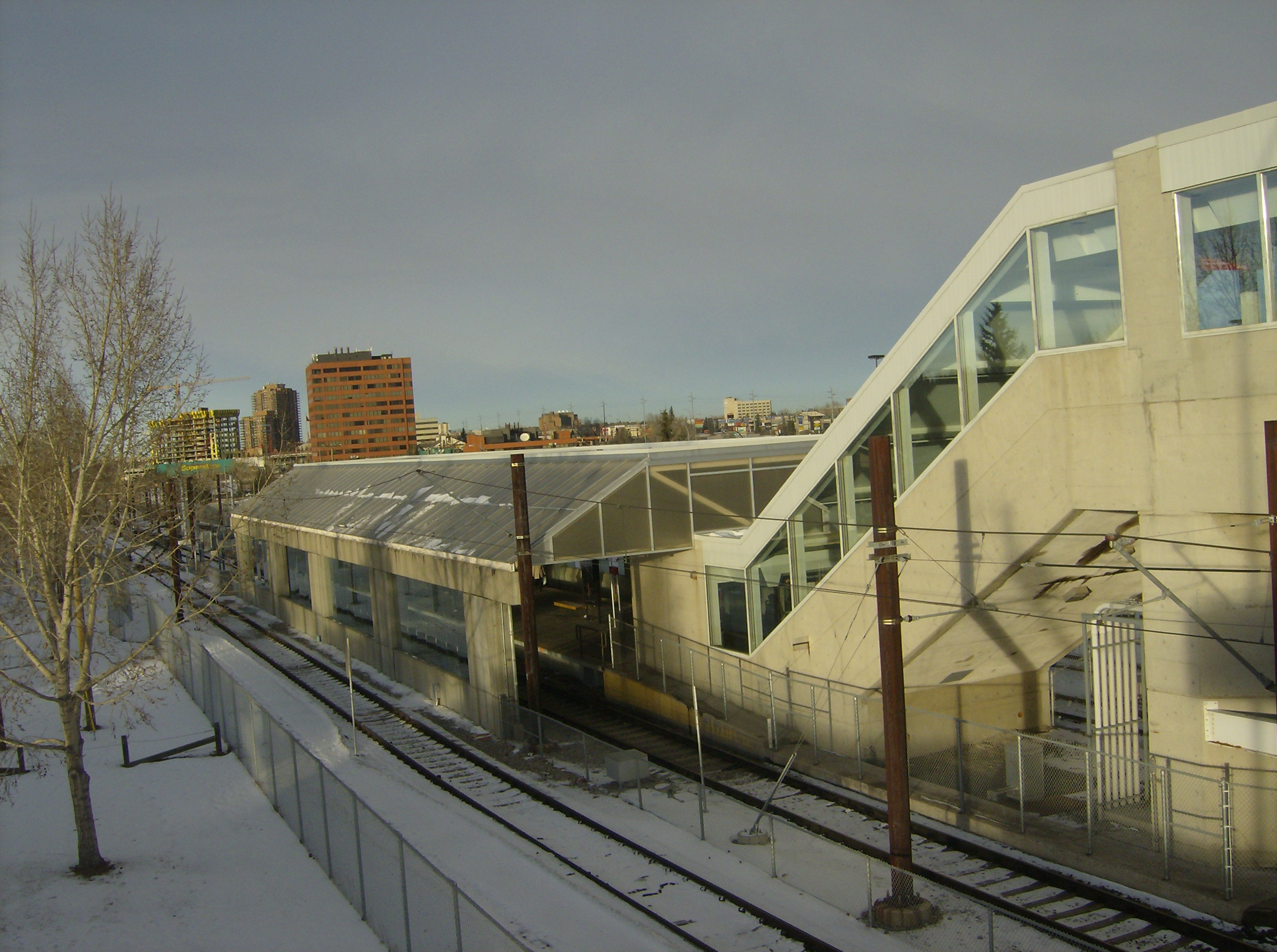

General information
- Location: 11015 Anderson Station Way SW
- Coordinates: 50°57′17″N 114°04′29″W
- Owner: Calgary Transit
- Platforms: Center-loading platform
- Connections: 10 Macleod Trail; 29 Queensland; 35 Bonavista/Canyon Meadows; 56 Woodbine; 92 McKenzie Towne; 96 McKenzie; 150 114 Avenue SE

Construction
- Structure type: At-grade
- Parking: 1,750 spaces
- Accessible: yes

History
- Opened: 1981; 45 years ago
- Rebuilt: 2018; 8 years ago, June 2019; 7 years ago (completed)

Services
Preceding station	Calgary Transit	Following station
Southland toward Tuscany	Red Line	Canyon Meadows toward Somerset–Bridlewood
Location

Anderson Station is a CTrain light rail station in Southwood, Calgary, Alberta, Canada. It serves the south leg of the Red Line and it opened on May 25, 1981, and was the original southern terminus of the line. The station is located on the exclusive LRT right of way (adjacent to CPR ROW), 10.6 km (6.6 mi) south of the City Hall Interlocking.

The station consists of a centre-loading platform with mezzanine access at the South end and grade-level access at the North end. 1323 paved parking spaces are located on-site, as well as a 427 space overflow lot. The station is located just north of Anderson Road west of Macleod Trail. The station is located across from Southcentre Mall, accessible by a pedestrian bridge crossing Macleod Trail.

Construction of the Anderson station platform that was meant for three cars was expanded to accommodate four cars starting in June 2013, and was completed in the late fall of 2013.

The Anderson Shops and Garage, where the CTrain vehicles are maintained, is located here. CTrains operating on the NE line had to come up from the Anderson Garage every morning from the opening of the NE line in 1985 until the Oliver Bowen Maintenance Facility opened with McKnight–Westwinds station in 2008.

In 2005, the station registered and average transit of 11,300 boardings per weekday.

== History ==
=== Commuter rail pilot ===
Commencing a five-month trial run in April 1996, Calgary Transit piloted a Siemens RegioSprinter DMU (diesel multiple unit) railcar as part of a demonstration tour of North America. This pilot was done as a measure to test the viability of an LRT expansion and to provide relief for commuters travelling to and from the rapidly developing South Calgary. A new temporary passenger platform was added on the CP Rail line adjacent to Anderson station. The RegioSprinter was operated between this platform and a platform at 162 Avenue SW located north of the present-day Somerset–Bridlewood station. This service was only in operation during peak hours and was free-of-charge. Service was discontinued as the RegioSprinter continued its tour, however, this service proved to be highly successful and supported an extension of the Red Line to Somerset–Bridlewood in two phases.

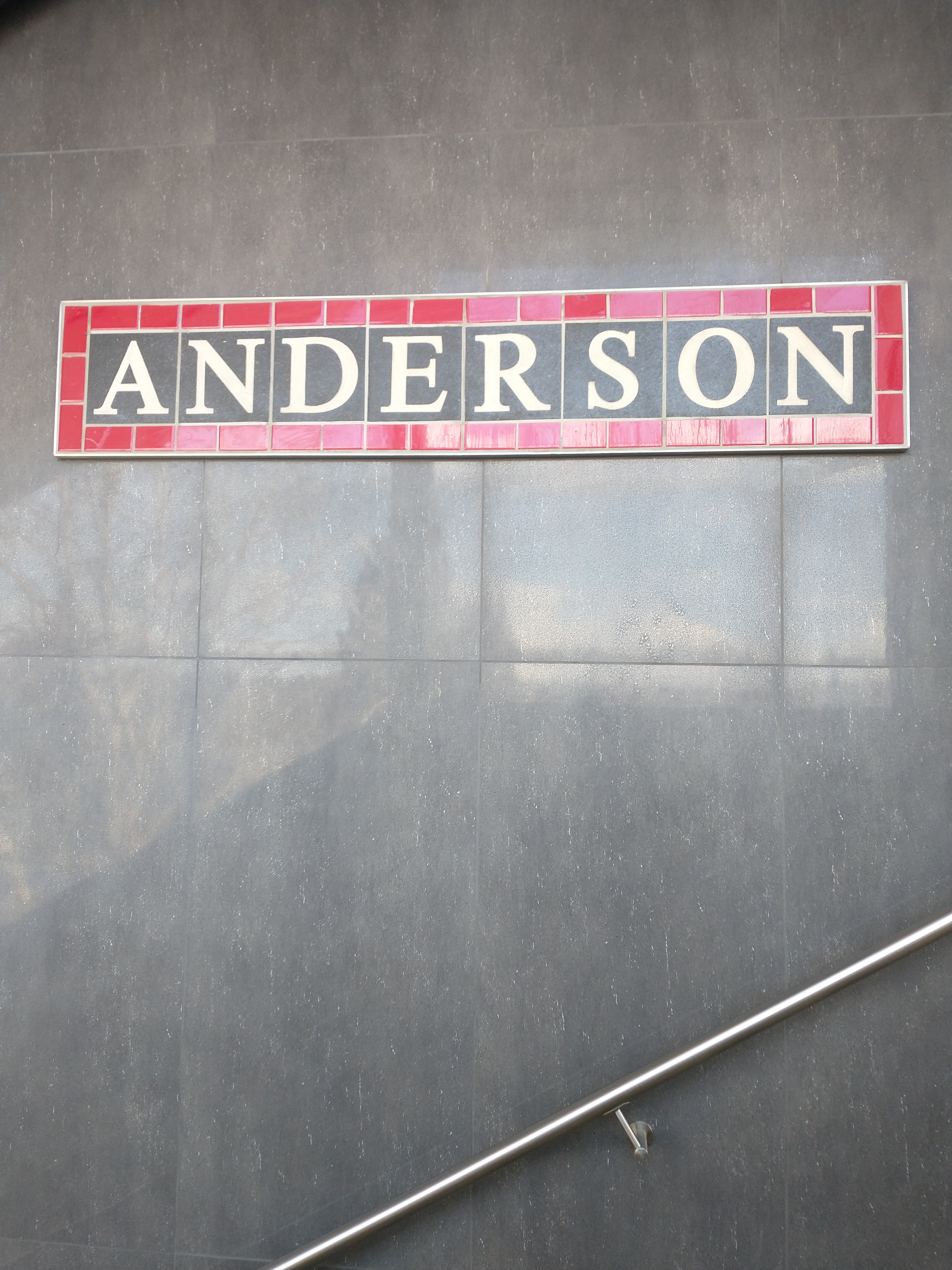
The iconic "Anderson" Station sign located on the upper-level of the station's stairwell. The sign is from the original 1981 station and was kept around post-renovations.

=== Station renovations ===
In January 2018, the south entrance to the Mezzanine level was closed as crews removed the entrance in preparation for renovations. On April 2, 2018, the mezzanine level was closed to perform renovations. The grade-level entrance remained open, as well as the station itself while renovations are underway. Renovations were expected to be completed by October 2018 but due to soil and structural issues arising during construction, the completion date was extended to Spring of 2019 with construction being completed in June 2019.

== Transit connections ==
Bus connections to Anderson station as of 31 August, 2026:

- 10 - Macleod Trail City Hall (North)
- 29 - Queensland (East)
- 35 - Bonavista (East) / 35 - Canyon Meadows (West)
- 56 - Woodbine (North)
- 92 - McKenzie Towne (Outbound)
- 96 - McKenzie (East)
- 150 - 114 Avenue SE (East)

== Around the station ==
=== Major destinations ===
- Anderson Transit Garage
- Fish Creek Library
- Southcentre Mall

=== Communities ===
Residential

- Southwood
- Willow Park

=== Major Streets ===
- Anderson Rd
- Bonaventure Dr
- Macleod Trail

== See also ==
- CTrain
- Red Line (Calgary)
- Canyon Meadows station
- Fish Creek–Lacombe station
- Southcentre Mall
- Southwood, Calgary
- Willow Park, Calgary
