= Macleod Trail =

Road in Calgary

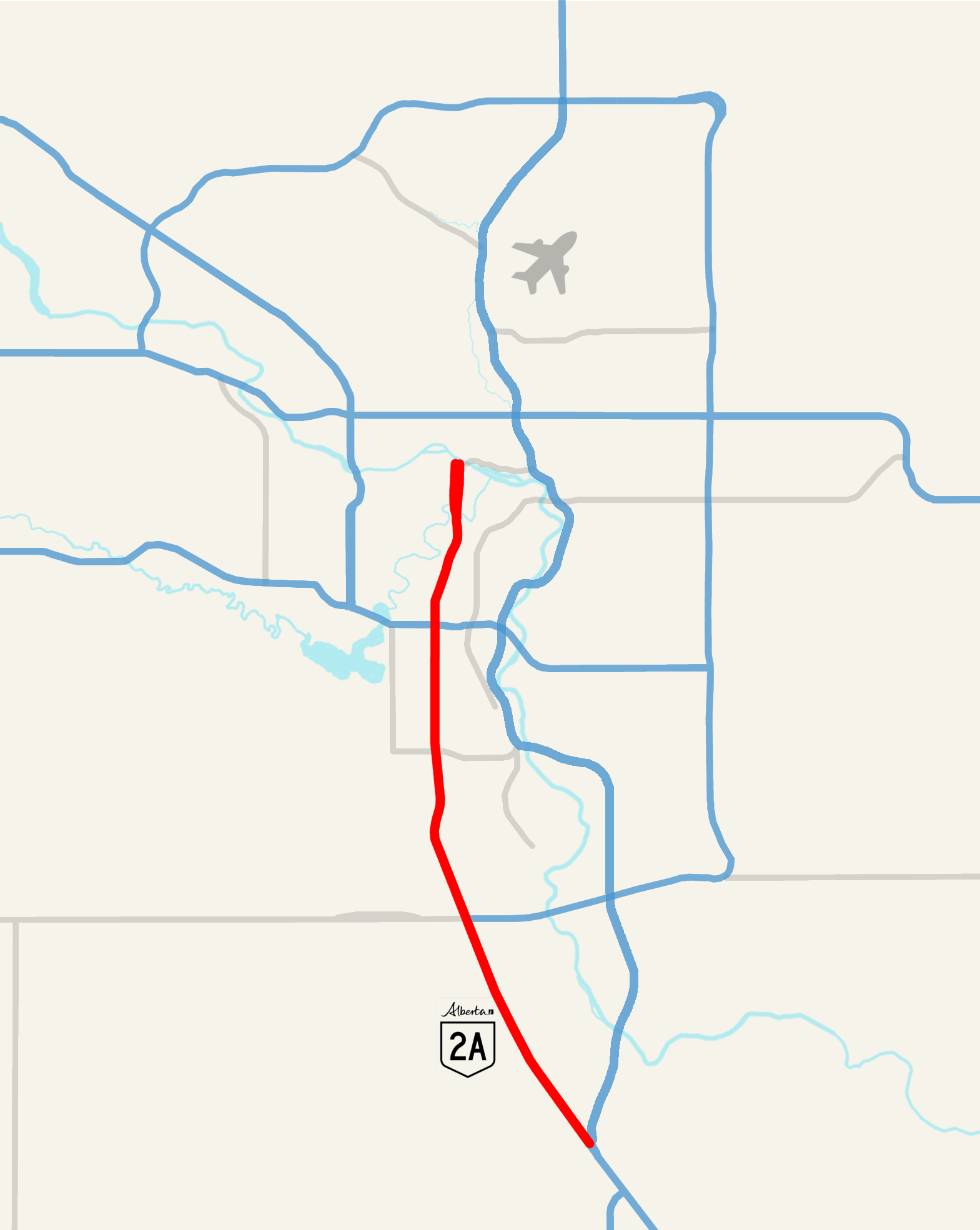
- Map of Macleod Trail
- Part of: Highway 2A
- Maintained by: City of Calgary, Alberta Transportation
- Length: 27.7 km (17.2 mi)
- Location: Calgary, Alberta
- North end: Riverfront Avenue
- Major junctions: Glenmore Trail, Southland Drive, Anderson Road, Sun Valley Boulevard, Stoney Trail
- South end: Highway 2 (Deerfoot Trail)

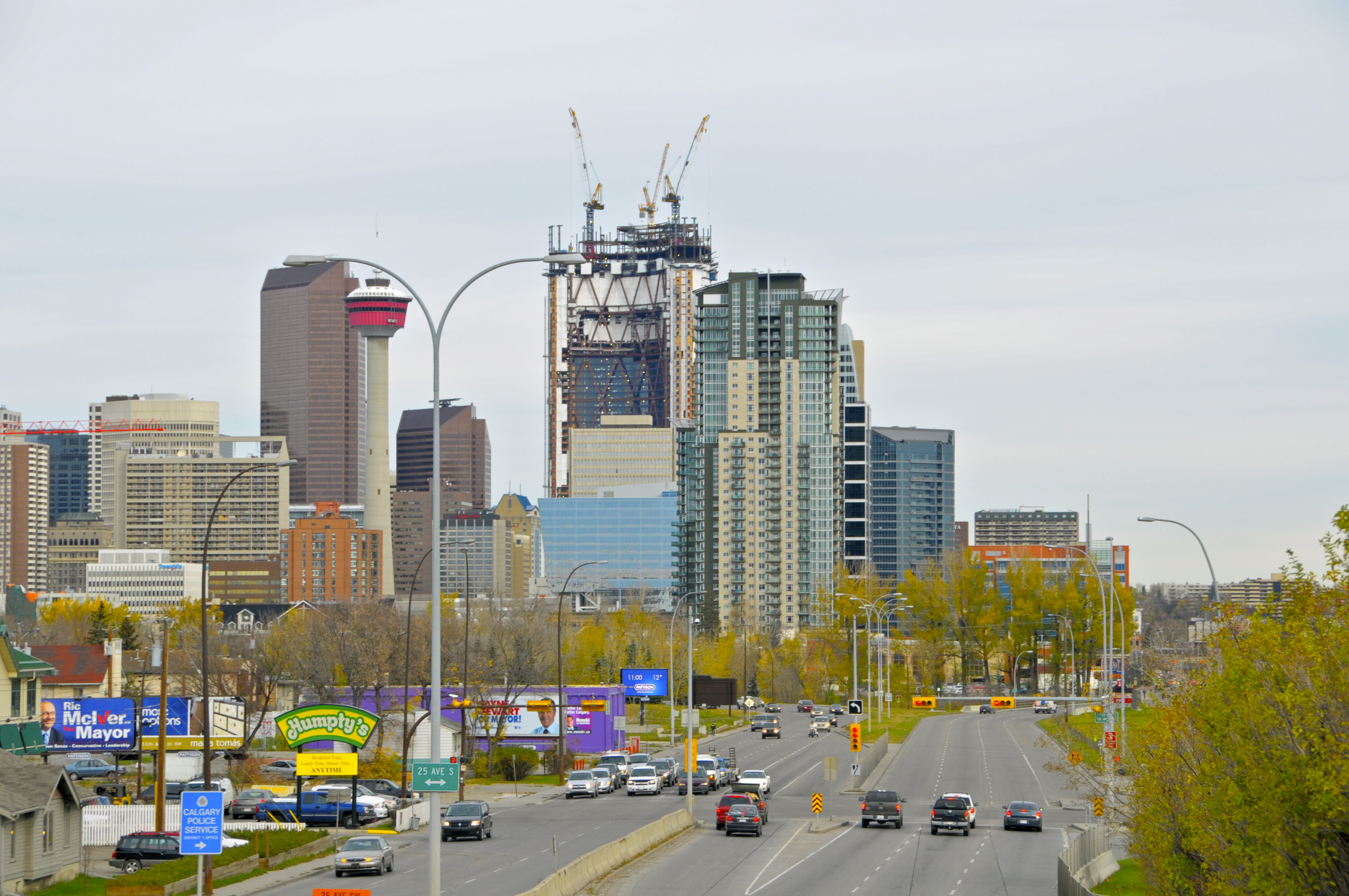
Macleod Trail going into downtown Calgary (2010)

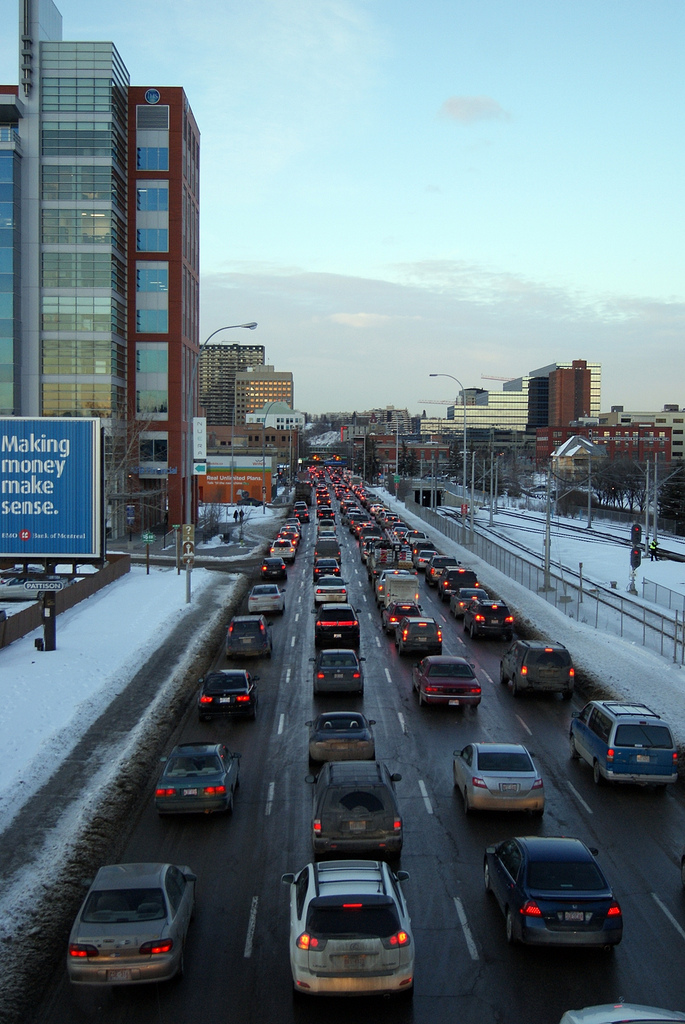
Macleod Trail in downtown Calgary (2011)

Macleod Trail is a major road in Calgary, Alberta. It is a six- to eight-lane principal arterial road extending from downtown Calgary to the south of the city, where it merges into Highway 2. South of Anderson Road, Macleod Trail is an expressway and is slated to be upgraded to a freeway in the future. It is named for its destination to the south, Fort Macleod, itself named for James Macleod, of the North-West Mounted Police.

== Route description ==
Macleod Trail effectively divides the southwest and the southeast quadrants of the city, and many communities (inner city as well as suburban) were developed along its course. Macleod Trail (along with Crowchild Trail and Deerfoot Trail) constitutes one of the three major north-south corridors of the city.

Beginning as a one-way street for northbound traffic (with southbound traffic following 1st Street SE one block to the west), the road passes by Calgary City Hall, Olympic Plaza, the building that housed the former Calgary Central Library, and the EPCOR Centre for the Performing Arts. South of downtown, it defines the western edge of the Calgary Stampede grounds, as it passes through the Beltline district, then provides access to the MNP Community & Sport Centre as it runs between the historic inner city communities of Mission and Ramsay. South of Elbow River, Macleod Trail becomes a two-way road and has various motels established on its sides, and Chinook Centre faces the road as it passes between the communities of Manchester, Manchester Industrial, Meadowlark Park, Kingsland and Fairview. Macleod Trail is lined with commercial developments on both sides for its entire length between Erlton and Lake Bonavista, including strip malls, auto malls, big-box stores and shopping centres such as Southcentre Mall, and Calgary's largest suburban office complex at Southland Park. The southern leg of the C-Train LRT system (Route 201) is also developed along Macleod Trail.

In November 2007, Calgary City Council approved a functional planning study for the portion of Macleod Trail that extends from Anderson Road north to Downtown. Expected recommendations include interchanges at Heritage Drive and Southland Drive, as well as possible traffic signal refinements. In addition, two other interchange locations are planned to be constructed within ten years. They are at the intersection with Lake Fraser gate and at the intersection with 194 Avenue. This would make Macleod Trail a freeway from Anderson Road to nearly the city limits. On August 13, 2017, the first diverging diamond interchange in Canada was opened at 162 Avenue.

=== Communities along route ===
- Downtown East Village
- Beltline (Victoria Park)
- Erlton
- Parkhill
- Elboya
- Manchester
- Windsor Park
- Meadowlark Park
- Kingsland / Fairview
- Haysboro / Acadia
- Southwood / Willow Park
- Canyon Meadows / Lake Bonavista
- Fish Creek Provincial Park
- Shawnee Slopes / Midnapore
- Millrise
- Shawnessy / Sundance
- Silverado / Chaparral
- Belmont / Walden
- Pine Creek / Legacy

== Major intersections ==
From north to south:

Location	km	mi	Destinations	Notes
Calgary	0.0	0.0	Riverfront Avenue	Begins as one-way couplets; northbound traffic follows Macleod Trail, southbound traffic follows 1 Street SE
Calgary	0.2	0.12	4 Avenue SE	Westbound one-way
Calgary	0.3	0.19	5 Avenue SE	Eastbound one-way; connects to Memorial Drive and Edmonton Trail
Calgary	0.4	0.25	6 Avenue SE	Westbound one-way west of Macleod Trail
Calgary	0.5	0.31	7 Avenue SE	City Hall/Bow Valley College station; Transit mall (no vehicle access); passes the historic Calgary City Hall
Calgary	0.6	0.37	8 Avenue SE (Stephen Avenue)	Pedestrian mall; passes the Calgary Municipal Building and Olympic Plaza
Calgary	0.7	0.43	9 Avenue SE	Eastbound one-way
Calgary	0.9	0.56	11 Avenue SE	Westbound one-way
Calgary	1.1	0.68	12 Avenue SE	Eastbound one-way
Calgary	1.4	0.87	17 Avenue SE / Florence LaDue Parade	Passes Victoria Park/Stampede station; access to Stampede Park
Calgary	1.8	1.1	Crosses the Elbow River; Victoria Bridge (northbound) and Pattison Bridge (southbound)	
Calgary	1.9	1.2	One-way transition; south-to-north U-turn ramp	
Calgary	2.3	1.4	25 Avenue SE – Stampede Park	Passes Erlton/Stampede station
Calgary	3.1	1.9	Spiller Road	Northbound right in/right out; original alignment of Macleod Trail (pre-1967)
Calgary	3.6	2.2	39 Avenue S	Access to 39 Avenue station
Calgary	3.9	2.4	42 Avenue S	
Calgary	5.7	3.5	58 Avenue SW	
Calgary	6.1	3.8	61 Avenue SW	Access to Chinook Centre and Chinook station
Calgary	6.4	4.0	Glenmore Trail	Single-point urban interchange (traffic signals)
Calgary	7.7	4.8	78 Avenue SW	Grade separated
Calgary	8.1	5.0	Heritage Drive	Access to Heritage station and Heritage Park
Calgary	9.7	6.0	Southland Drive	Access to Southland station
Calgary	10.8	6.7	109 Avenue S	Access to Anderson station and Southcentre Mall; becomes an expressway
Calgary	10.9	6.8	Southcentre Mall	Northbound right in/right out
Calgary	11.3	7.0	Anderson Road	Partial cloverleaf interchange; to Highway 1 west / Highway 2 north
Calgary	11.3	7.0	Lake Fraser Drive	Northbound exit only
Calgary	12.1	7.5	Lake Fraser Drive	Northbound right in/right out
Calgary	12.5	7.8	Lake Fraser Gate	Northbound right in/right out weekdays from 6 a.m. - 8:30 a.m.
Calgary	13.5	8.4	Canyon Meadows Drive	Partial cloverleaf interchange; access Lake Fraser Drive and Canyon Meadows station
Calgary	13.7	8.5	Crosses Fish Creek	
Calgary	14.1	8.8	Bannister Road / Shawnee Gate	Southbound exit and northbound entrance; access to Fish Creek Provincial Park
Calgary	14.6	9.1	James McKevitt Road	Southbound right in/right out; passes Fish Creek–Lacombe station
Calgary	14.9	9.3	149 Avenue SE to Bannister Road	Northbound right in/right out; northbound access to James McKevitt Road and Fish Creek Provincial Park
Calgary	15.5	9.6	Shawnessy Boulevard / Midlake Boulevard	Partial cloverleaf interchange; accesses Shawville Boulevard, Bannister Road, and Shawnessy station
Calgary	16.6	10.3	162 Avenue SE / Sun Valley Boulevard	Canada's first Diverging diamond interchange; access to Somerset–Bridlewood station
Calgary	17.2– 18.4	10.7– 11.4	Shawville Boulevard	Southbound exit only
Calgary	17.2– 18.4	10.7– 11.4	Stoney Trail (Highway 201) / Highway 2A begins	Highway 201 exit 5; combination interchange; former Highway 22X; Highway 2A northern terminus
Calgary	20.0	12.4	194 Avenue S	Proposed interchange; to be a southbound exit and northbound entrance
Calgary	21.2	13.2	210 Avenue S	Proposed Diverging diamond interchange
↑ / ↓	23.3	14.5	Highway 552 south (226 Avenue S) – De Winton	Proposed Interchange; Southbound right in/right out
Foothills County	25.4	15.8	Dunbow Road – De Winton, Heritage Pointe	Proposed Interchange; Northbound access to Highway 552
Foothills County	27.7	17.2	Highway 2 north (Deerfoot Trail) – Airport, Edmonton	Y interchange; Highway 2 exit 225; northbound exit and southbound entrance
Foothills County	27.7	17.2	Highway 2 south / Highway 2A south – Okotoks, Fort Macleod, Lethbridge	Continues south
1.000 mi = 1.609 km; 1.000 km = 0.621 mi: HOV only; Incomplete access; Route transition

== History ==
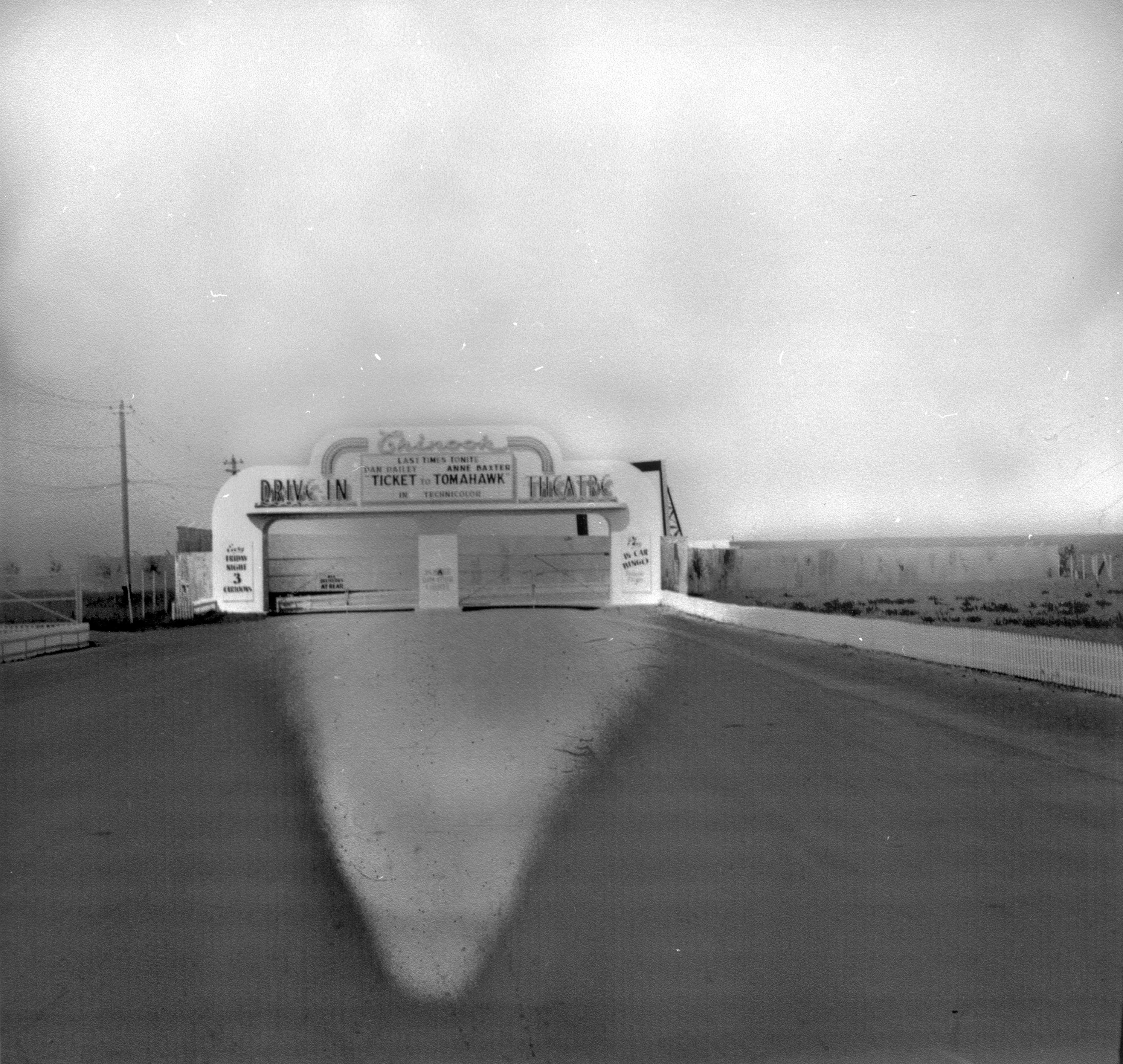
Chinook Drive-In (1950)

From 1949 to 1958, the Chinook Drive-In was located on Macleod Trail a half mile south of the Calgary city limits.

== See also ==
- Transportation in Calgary
