= R. T. Alderman School =

Canadian science school

Coordinates: 50.9613°N 114.0446°W

Information
- Motto: Together We Make A Difference
- Established: 1966; 60 years ago
- Colors: Blue, Purple, and Black
- Mascot: Raven
- Website: rtalderman.cbe.ab.ca

R. T. Alderman School is a Science School in southeastern Calgary in the province of Alberta, Canada. It is located in the community of Maple Ridge.

== History ==
The school is named after Robert Thomas Alderman. Alderman was an influential person who brought greatness to junior high schools to Calgary in late 1940. This school has been around since 1966 and is situated beside the Willow Park recreation center (whose outdoor facilities are often used for physical education by the school), and Maple Ridge Elementary School. The main colours of this school are blue, gray, and white. The school logo was a hippopotamus for a number of years, then it was a snake. The school logo now is a Raven, with a new logo of a Raven created by a student. The school's motto is "Together We Make A Difference"

== Science ==
As a science school, there are many expectations of students that relate to science. One expectation is that each student enters a project in the science fair every year. See CBE guidelines for further science school expectations.

== Athletics ==
The school's team is the RTA Ravens. The school has cross-country, track and field, badminton, volleyball, soccer, and basketball teams. In the annual Miracle Mile, all students run a course of roughly a kilometer around the fields, nearby community center, and Maple Ridge Elementary. The NSA program transferred to RTA in 2011. Students enrolled in the national sports academy at Fairview will either have to go to RTA or go into a different program at Fairview, such as TLC, French Immersion or late French.

== Campus ==
The school has a design shared by two other Calgary schools. The architecture features slanted roofs and columns on the windows. The school overall has about 70 rooms. It has a band room, an industrial arts room, and a home economics room.

== Alumni ==
One of the alumni is astronaut Robert Thirsk. Another, is Kaleb Toth of the Calgary Roughnecks professional lacrosse team. He holds many track and field records for the school.
