= Canyon Meadows station =

Calgary light train station in Alberta, Canada

Canyon Meadows
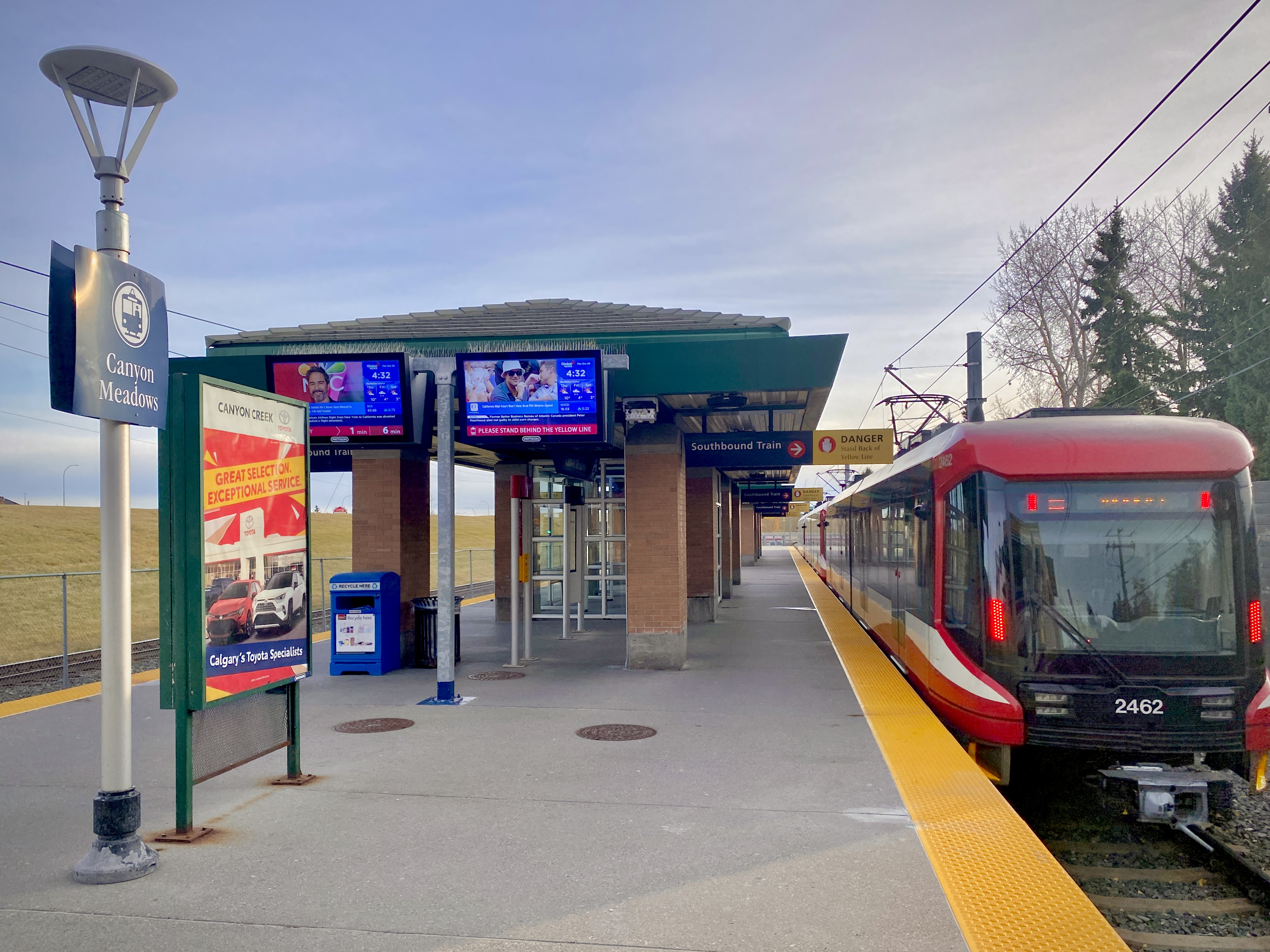

General information
- Location: 416 Cantrell Drive SW
- Coordinates: 50°56′10″N 114°04′11.4″W
- Owner: Calgary Transit
- Platforms: Center-loading platform
- Connections: 28 Deer Run; 35 Canyon Meadows; 37 Elbow Drive; 44 Deer Ridge; 83 Parkland

Construction
- Structure type: At-grade
- Parking: 260 spaces
- Accessible: yes

History
- Opened: 2001; 25 years ago
- Rebuilt: 2011; 15 years ago (platform extension)

Services
Preceding station	Calgary Transit	Following station
Anderson toward Tuscany	Red Line	Fish Creek–Lacombe toward Somerset–Bridlewood
Location

Canyon Meadows station is a CTrain light rail station in Canyon Meadows, Calgary, Alberta, Canada. It serves the South Line (Route 201) and opened on October 9, 2001, as part of the South LRT Extension Phase I. It is located on the exclusive LRT right of way (adjacent to the CPR ROW) 12.6 km (7.8 mi) South of the City Hall Interlocking, beside MacLeod Trail, to the north of Canyon Meadows Drive.

The station has a pedestrian bridge connecting to Lake Bonavista as well as a large park-and-ride facility on the east side of Macleod Trail. Stairs and escalators, as well as an elevator provide access down to the center-loading platform. This is the only station on the South line without grade-level access due to space constraints. 260 parking spaces are located at the station.

In 2005, the station registered and average transit of 5,800 boardings per weekday.

Originally constructed as a 3-car length platform, construction of the platform to accommodate 4-train cars started in Summer 2011 and was completed in December that year.

== Transit connections ==
Bus connections to Canyon Meadows station as of 31 August, 2026:

- 28 - Deer Run (South)
- 35 - Canyon Meadows (West)
- 37 - Elbow Drive Heritage Station (North)
- 44 - Avenida (North) / 44 - Deer Ridge (South)
- 83 - Parkland (South)
