= Canyon Meadows, Calgary =

Canyon Meadows
- Neighbourhood
- Location of Canyon Meadows in Calgary
- Coordinates: 50°56′28″N 114°05′07″W
- Country: Canada
- Province: Alberta
- City: Calgary
- Quadrant: SW
- Ward: 13
- Established: 1965

Government
  - Mayor: Jeromy Farkas
  - Administrative body: Calgary City Council
  - Councillor: Dan McLean (Communities First)

Area
  - Total: 3.1 km^{2} (1.2 sq mi)
- Elevation: 1,085 m (3,560 ft)

Population (2006)
  - Total: 7,935
  - Average Income: $66,787
- Website: Canyon Meadows Community Association

Canyon Meadows is a residential neighbourhood in the southwest quadrant of Calgary, Alberta, Canada. It is bounded by Anderson Road to the north, Macleod Trail to the east, Fish Creek Provincial Park and Canyon Meadows Drive to the south and 14 Street W to the west. The Canyon Meadows golf course is developed northwest of the neighbourhood.

The community is served by the Canyon Meadows station of the C-Train LRT system.

Canyon Meadows was established in 1965. It is represented in the Calgary City Council by the Ward 13 councillor.

== Demographics ==
In the City of Calgary's 2012 municipal census, Canyon Meadows had a population of 7,787 living in 3,195 dwellings, a -1.4% increase from its 2011 population of 7,895. With a land area of 3.1 km^{2} (1.2 sq mi), it had a population density of 2,510/km^{2} (6,510/sq mi) in 2012.

Residents in this community had a median household income of $66,787 in 2000, and there were 10.6% low income residents living in the neighbourhood. As of 2000, 19.8% of the residents were immigrants. A proportion of 10.1% of the buildings were condominiums or apartments, and 17% of the housing was used for renting.

Pop. Overtime
Year	Population
2014	7838
2015	7949
2016	7855
2017	7553
2018	7509
2019	7624
2021	7435

== Crime ==
Crime Data
Year	Crime Rate (/100 pop.)
2018	1.9
2019	2.3
2020	2.1
2021	1.6
2022	2.1
2023	1.5

== Education ==
The community is served by Canyon Meadows Elementary, Dr. E. P. Scarlett Senior High, Robert Warren Junior High public schools as well as St. Catherine Elementary (Catholic).

== See also ==
- List of neighbourhoods in Calgary
