= Southwood, Calgary =

Southwood
- Neighbourhood
- Location of Southwood in Calgary
- Coordinates: 50°57′25″N 114°05′04″W
- Country: Canada
- Province: Alberta
- City: Calgary
- Quadrant: SW
- Ward: 11
- Established: 1960

Government
  - Mayor: Jeromy Farkas
  - Administrative body: Calgary City Council
  - Councillor: Rob Ward (Communities First)
- Elevation: 1,070 m (3,510 ft)

Population (2006)
  - Total: 6,197
  - Average Income: $51,409
- Website: Southwood Community Association

Southwood is a residential neighbourhood in the southwest quadrant of Calgary, Alberta, Canada. It is bounded by 98th Avenue (an alley north of Southland Drive) to the north, Macleod Trail to the east, Anderson Road to the south and 14th Street SW to the west. Southland Drive passes through the northern part of the community. A major roadway, Elbow Drive, bisects the community.

The community is served by the Southland and Anderson stations of the C-Train LRT system. Southcentre Mall is located east from the neighbourhood.

Southwood was established in 1960. It is represented in the Calgary City Council by the Ward 11 councillor.

== Local relevance ==
Southwood is home to Southland Block or known as S Block. Southland Block includes the area of and around Southland Station, including the Southland Drive Bridge, Southland Park, the abandoned Black Swan pub, and Haddon Road Park. It is famous in Calgary youth culture for the heavy amounts of graffiti, specifically around the Southland Drive Bridge.

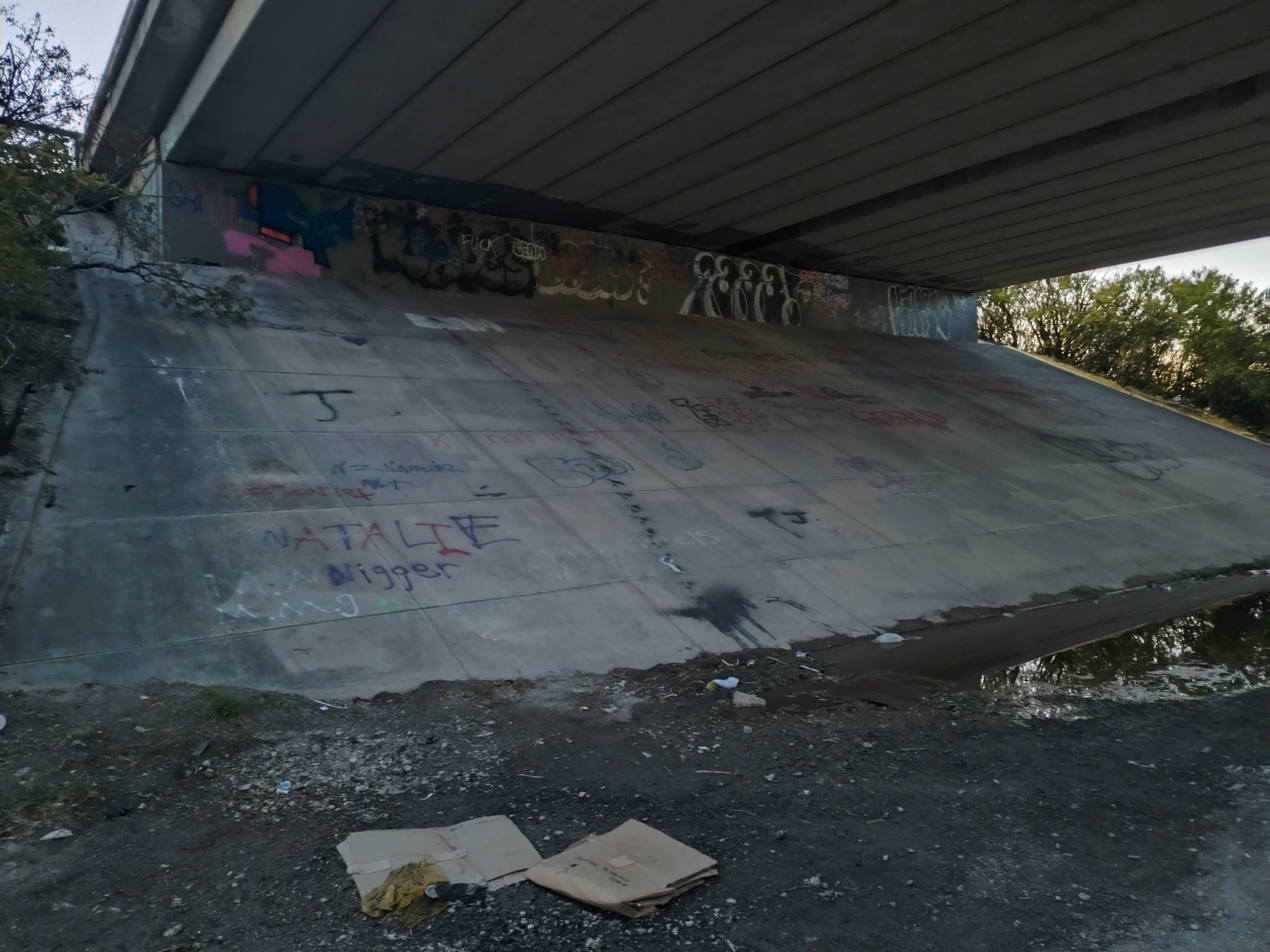
The Southland Drive Bridge of 'S Block'

== Demographics ==
In the City of Calgary's 2012 municipal census, Southwood had a population of 6,085 living in 2,658 dwellings, a 2% increase from its 2011 population of 5,965. With a land area of 2.7 km^{2} (1.0 sq mi), it had a population density of 2,250/km^{2} (5,840/sq mi) in 2012.

Residents in this community had a median household income of $51,409 in 2000, and there were 14% low income residents living in the neighbourhood. As of 2000, 18.8% of the residents were immigrants. A proportion of 21% of the buildings were condominiums or apartments, and 42.4% of the housing was used for renting.

Pop. Overtime
Year	Population
2014	6357
2015	6420
2016	6282
2017	6214
2018	6141
2019	6246
2021	6095

=== Crime rate by year ===
Crime Data
Year	Crime Rate
2018	3.1 /100
2019	4.1 /100
2020	2.9 /100
2021	3.5 /100
2022	4.2 /100
2023	4.6 /100

== Education ==
The community is served by the Ethel M. Johnson Elementary, Harold Panabaker Junior High and Foundations For the Future Elementary public schools, as well as St. Stephen Elementary & Junior High (Catholic). The Southwood branch of the Calgary Public Library is located near the intersection of Southland Drive and Elbow Drive.

== Business ==
Commercial development in the neighbourhood includes the Southland Park complex along Macleod Trail and the Southwood Corner mini mall at the intersection of Southland Drive and Elbow Drive as well as several other areas. In the 1960s and 1970s Southwood was home to the Corral Drive-in movie theatre. The drive-in closed to make way for Calgary Transit's Anderson Station shops and garage.

== Transit ==
In addition to the C-train, several bus routes run through Southwood. Most run along Southland Drive from other communities with the purpose of allowing passengers to transfer from a bus to the C-train at Southland Station. Route 3 (Elbow Drive / Sandstone), which travels along Elbow Drive, in both North and South directions, does not stop at either C-train station in Southwood. Passengers wishing to transfer from Bus #3 to the C-train must do so at Heritage Station in the community of Haysboro.

== See also ==
- List of neighbourhoods in Calgary
