= William Roper Hull =

Canadian rancher, meat packer, businessman and philanthropist

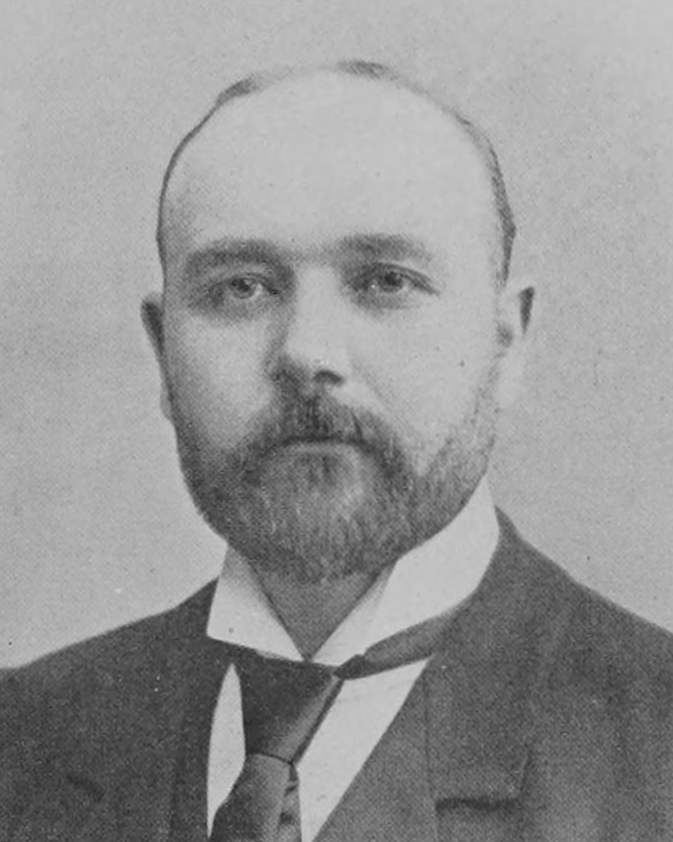
- Born: December 20, 1856; Broadwindsor, Dorset, England
- Died: April 4, 1925 (aged 68); Calgary, Alberta, Canada
- Spouse: Emmeline Mary Ellis (m. 1903)

William Charles James Roper Hull (December 20, 1856 – April 4, 1925) was a Canadian rancher, meat packer, businessman, and philanthropist. He played a prominent role in western Canada's early economic development by integrating a systematic approach to cattle raising, meat processing, and retailing on a large scale in Alberta.

== Early life ==
Hull was born on December 20, 1856, in Broadwindsor, Dorset, England, to parents Arthur and Honora Hull. After his mother's death, Hull and his older brother John moved to Canada in 1873.

== Career ==
Hull found work as a cowboy on the Cherry Creek Ranch in British Columbia, where he began ranching and breeding horses and cattle, as well as butchering and selling the cattle. In 1883, Hull and his brother brought 1200 horses to Calgary, Alberta, which they sold to North-West Mounted Police officers and the Northwest Cattle Company. Seeing a future in Alberta, Hull bought a farm near Midnapore, Alberta, where he established a supply farm, butcher shop, and abattoir. In 1886, Hull and W.P. Trounce began their butchering business Hull, Trounce and Co. in Calgary, while his brother stayed in Kamloops, British Columbia. The following year, Hull developed a beef partnership with the Canadian Pacific Railway, thus creating Calgary's first vertically integrated meatpacking business. Eventually, Trounce left the company and Hull rebranded as Hull Bros and Co. with his brother John.

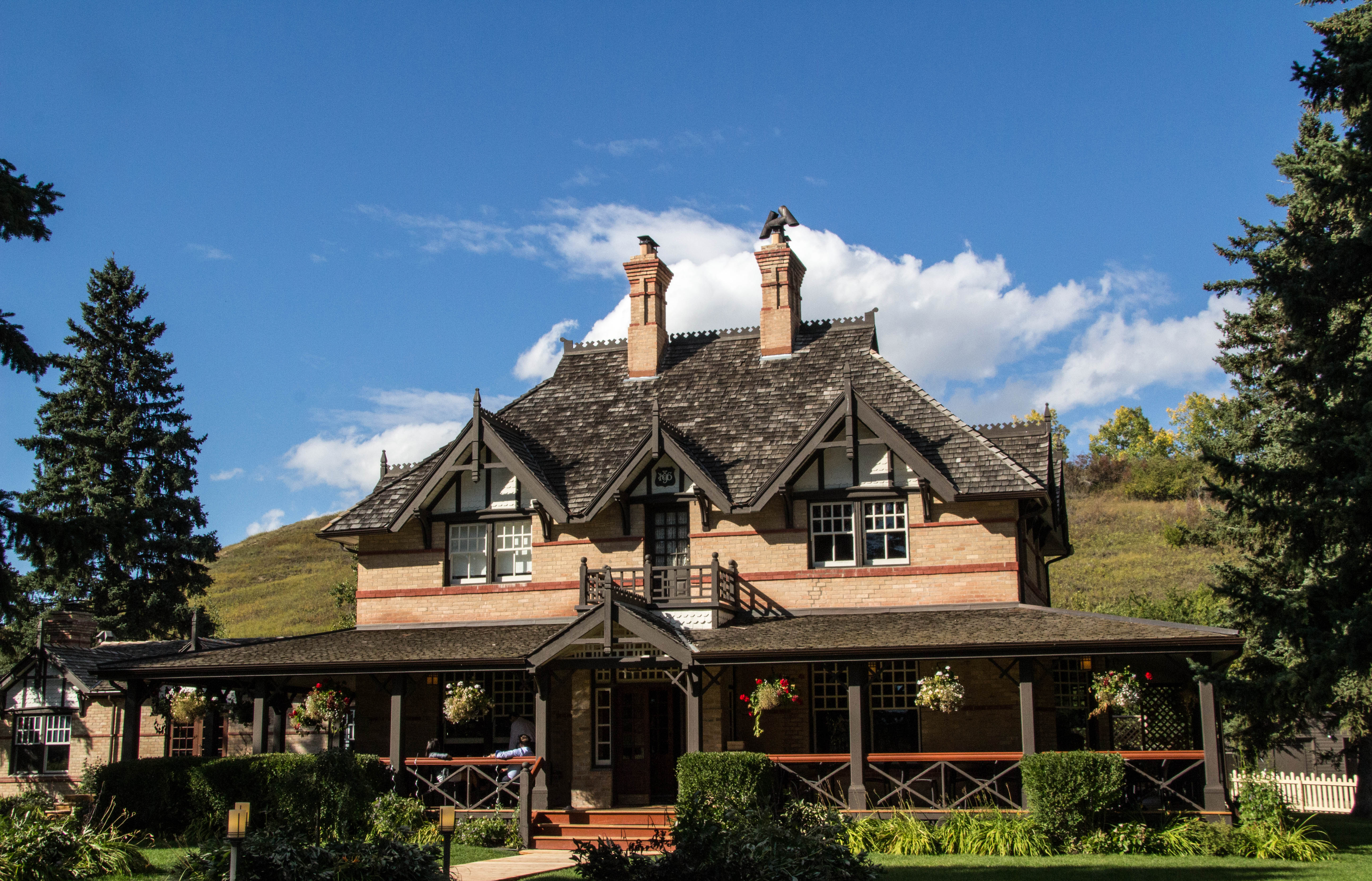
William Roper Hull Ranche House in Fish Creek Provincial Park, Calgary.

In 1892, Hull bought an 800-acre farm on Fish Creek which he used for mechanical irrigation to improve the output of his orders. Due to the size of the land, Hull's irrigating system increased hay yields from 90 to 1,200 tons. As a result, he invented a new hay-stacking machine which spread across Canada. He also transformed cattle ranching into "intensive mixed farming" through the use of ditches. Hull spent $2,000 to construct a ditch near the ranche to water the large acres of land, which he said he earned back within the first year. He has been credited with the first use of fences in cattle ranching in Calgary. In 1893, Hull funded the construction of a 700-seat opera house named in his honour, although it was eventually demolished in 1963 for a parking lot. Besides the opera house, Hull also erected the Grain Exchange, Alberta Block, and Albion Block during his lifetime.

Hull lived on the ranche in a house built by architect James Llewellyn Wilson, until businessman Patrick Burns purchased it in 1902. However, the William Roper Hull Ranche House, which Hull purchased in 1892, is considered a historical place in Calgary. In 1903, Hull married Emmeline Mary Ellis, although they had no children together.

== Death and legacy ==
After his death on April 4, 1925, Hull's estate was valued at $1,653,353. In his will, Hull stipulated that $800,000 was to go towards building an orphanage in Calgary. In 1944, Hull's previously owned property on Third Avenue South, aptly named the Hull Block, was bought by Peter Zoralol.

In 1962, the Hull Child and Family Services for students with behavioural and emotional difficulties opened and operated within the Calgary Board of Education. In 1988, Hull was posthumously deemed a Persons of National Historic Significance by the Canadian government.
