= Millrise, Calgary =

Millrise
- Neighbourhood
- Location of Millrise in Calgary
- Coordinates: 50°55′06″N 114°05′05″W
- Country: Canada
- Province: Alberta
- City: Calgary
- Quadrant: SW
- Ward: 13
- Established: 1982
- Annexed: 1961

Government
  - Mayor: Jeromy Farkas
  - Administrative body: Calgary City Council
  - Councillor: Dan McLean (Communities First)

Area
  - Total: 1.8 km^{2} (0.69 sq mi)
- Elevation: 1,080 m (3,540 ft)

Population (2006)
  - Total: 6,509
  - Average Income: $70,870
- Website: Millrise Community Association

Millrise (The Rise) is a suburban residential neighbourhood in the southwest quadrant of Calgary, Alberta. It is located south of Fish Creek Provincial Park, and is bounded by 146 Avenue S to the north, Macleod Trail to the east, Shawnessy Boulevard to the south and James McKevitt Road to the west.

The land was annexed to the City of Calgary in 1961 and Millrise was established in 1982. It is represented in the Calgary City Council by the Ward 13 councillor.

The community is served by the Fish Creek-Lacombe station of the C-Train LRT system.

== Demographics ==
In the City of Calgary's 2012 municipal census, Millrise had a population of 6,892 living in 2,635 dwellings, a 2.6% increase from its 2011 population of 6,717. With a land area of 1.8 km^{2} (0.69 sq mi), it had a population density of 3,830/km^{2} (9,920/sq mi) in 2012.

Residents in this community had a median household income of $70,870 in 2000, and there were 7.6% low income residents living in the neighbourhood. As of 2000, 19.8% of the residents were immigrants. A proportion of 7.5% of the buildings were condominiums or apartments, and 8.5% of the housing was used for renting.

== Education ==
The community is served by Our Lady of Peace Elementary & Junior High (Catholic school).

== See also ==
- List of neighbourhoods in Calgary

== Pictures ==
Millrise, Calgary, Alberta:

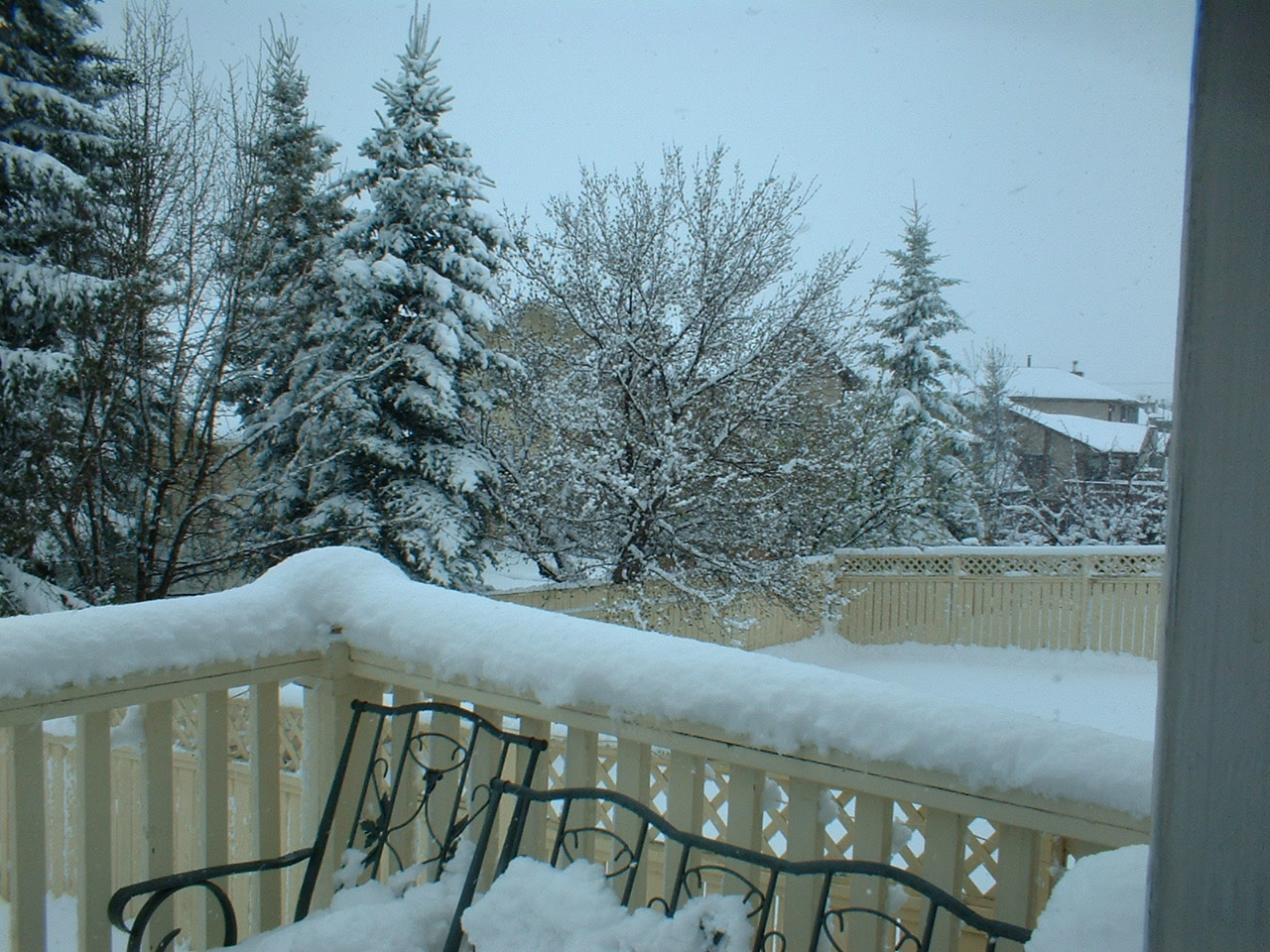
Apr. 26, 2003 Millpark Way

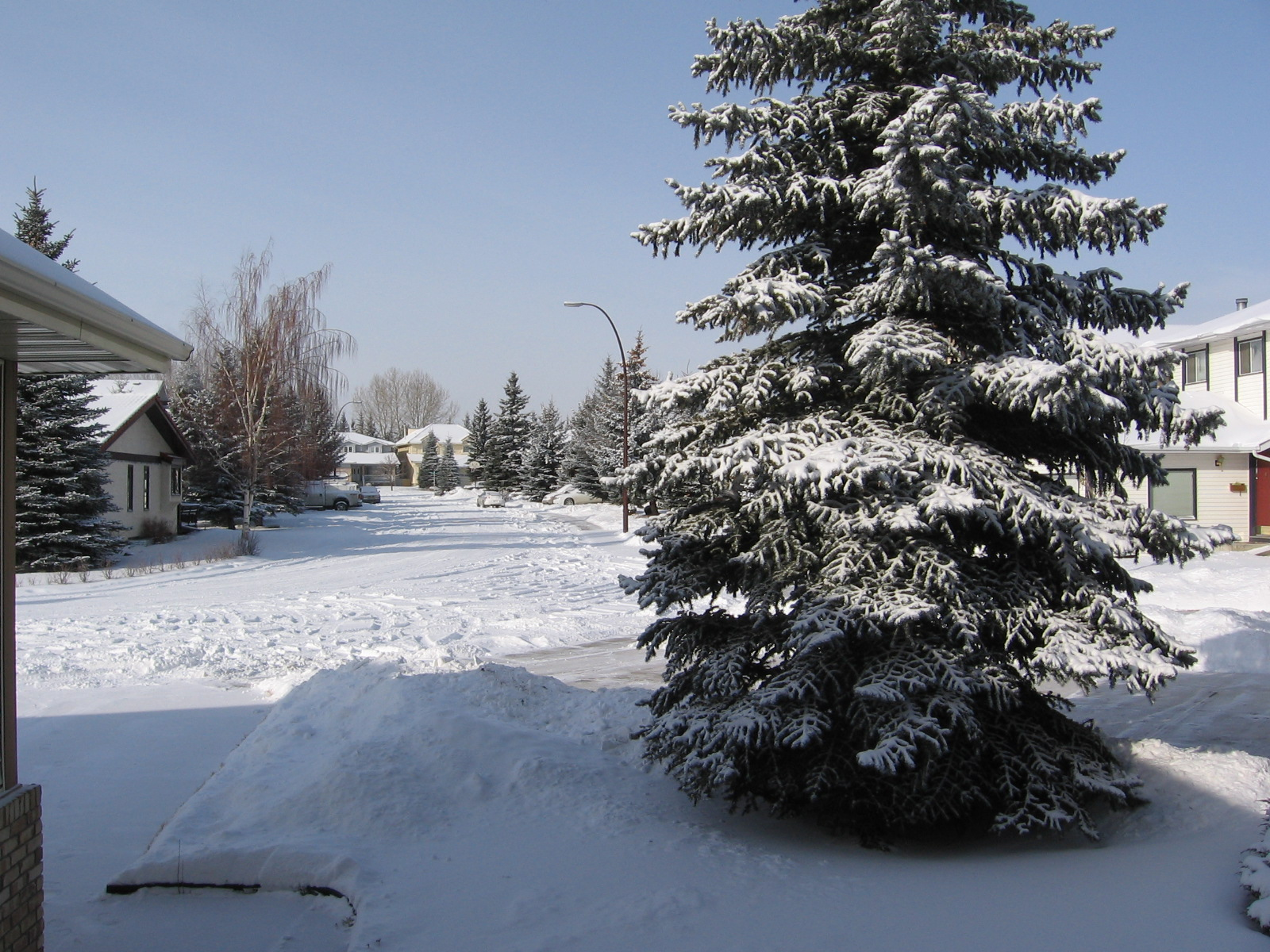
Feb. 8, 2008 Millpark Way

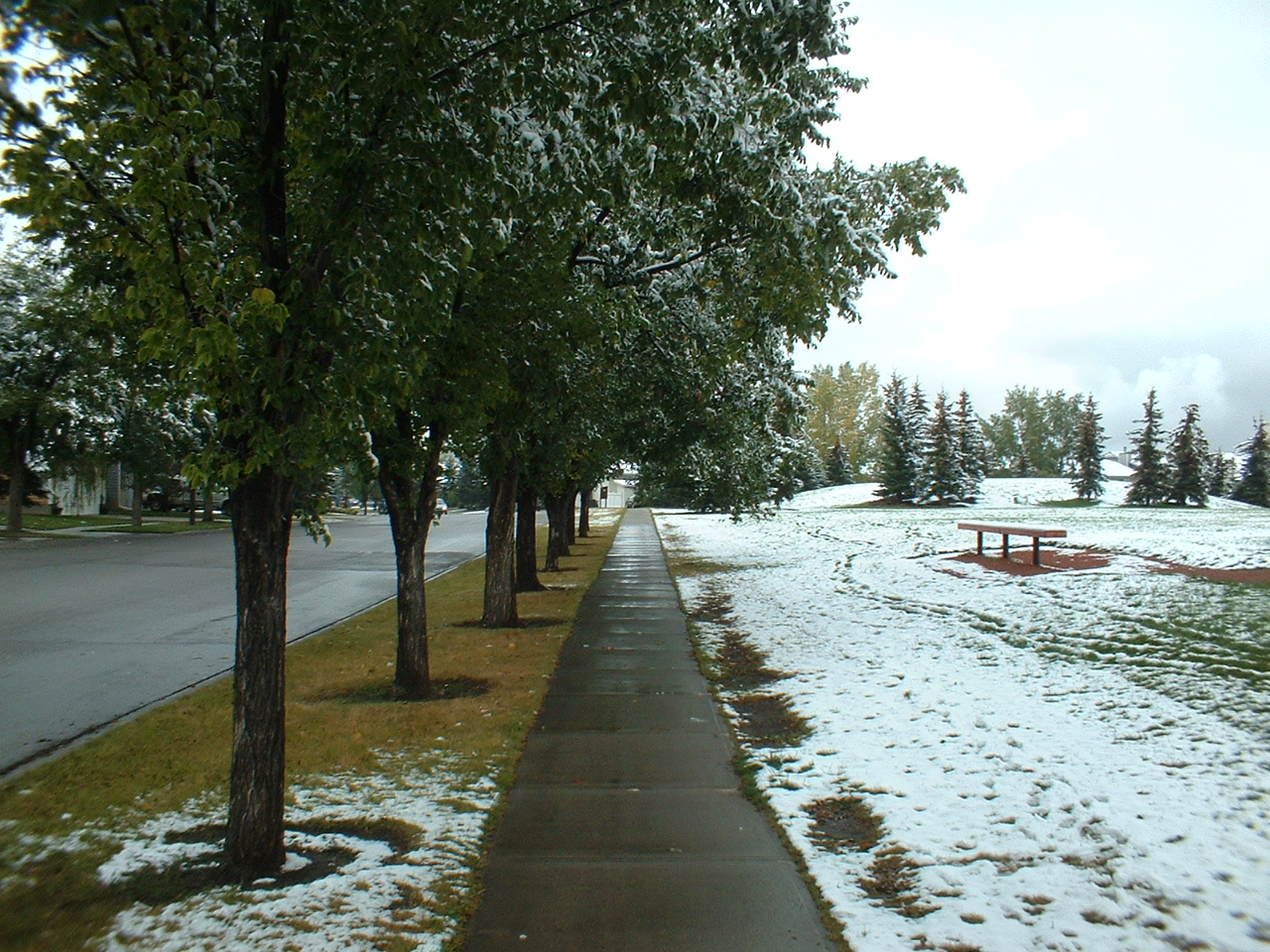
Sep. 16, 2003 Millrise Way
