= Evergreen, Calgary =

Evergreen/Evergreen Estates
- Neighbourhood(s)
- Location of Evergreen in Calgary
- Coordinates: 50°54′51″N 114°07′02″W
- Country: Canada
- Province: Alberta
- City: Calgary
- Quadrant: SW
- Ward: 13
- Established: Evergreen Estates: 1986, Evergreen: 1999.

Government
  - Mayor: Jeromy Farkas
  - Administrative body: Calgary City Council
  - Councillor: Dan McLean (Communities First)
- Elevation: 1,100 m (3,600 ft)

Population (2019)
  - Total: 21,500
- Website: Calgary Evergreen Community Association
- Shawnee-Evergreen Community Association There are two community Associations for this area

Evergreen, which includes Evergreen Estates, is a suburban residential neighbourhood in the southwest quadrant of Calgary, Alberta. It is located south of the Fish Creek Provincial Park, and southeast from the Tsuu T'ina first nation reserve. It Is east of Alpine Park with the Stoney Trail ring road being the border, north of Bridlewood and west of the neighbourhoods of Shawnee Slopes, Millrise and Shawnessy.

There are two sections of Evergreen, the older and more established Evergreen Estates, and the newer Evergreen to the south. The two sections, while civically amalgamated, have been known in the past as separate communities. The separator of the two is that all dwellings north of Fish Creek Blvd are considered to be in Evergreen Estates and all dwellings south of that boulevard is considered to be Evergreen. The members of both sections have separate community associations and street naming patterns. All streets with Evergreen in their name are members of the Shawnee-Evergreen Community Association along with the neighbouring community Shawnee Slopes, while those with different names are members of the Calgary Evergreen Community Association.

The area is represented in the Calgary City Council by the Ward 13 councillor.

The film Radiant City largely takes place in the community of Evergreen.

== Demographics ==
In the City of Calgary's 2019 municipal census, Evergreen had a population of 21,500 living in 7,256 dwellings. With a land area of 4.6 km^{2} (1.8 sq mi), it had a population density of 4,670/km^{2} (12,110/sq mi) in 2019. Updated demographics can be found on the City of Calgary website. maps.calgary.ca/census 2019 census results. https://maps.calgary.ca/census/. On this site, it shows that as of 2019, Evergreen was the 4th most populous neighbourhood in Calgary. As of 2014, Evergreen was the 2nd most populous neighbourhood in Calgary.

Residents in this community had a median household income of $105,640 in 2000, and there were 3.9% low income residents living in the neighbourhood. As of 2000, 18.2% of the residents were immigrants. All buildings were single-family detached homes and 1.3% of the housing was used for renting.

== Education ==
The Calgary Board of Education opened the Evergreen Elementary School in 2009, which currently accommodates Kindergarten to Grade 5 students residing in Evergreen. Marshall Springs Middle School which currently accommodates Grade 6 to Grade 9 was opened in September 2017. when Marshall Springs was built, it and Evergreen accommodated 4-9 and K-3 respectively, later changing to 5-9 and K-4, and currently is 6-9 and K-5.

Dr Freda Miller School, which currently accommodates K-5, opened began lessons in September 2020.

The Calgary Catholic School District operates the elementary school Our Lady of the Evergreens School, which offers Kindergarten to grade 6.

== Future Plans ==
In community plans dating back to 1999 and the foundation of Evergreen, a lot on Everridge Drive, adjacent to Marshall Springs Middle School, is designated to be a community centre, however, to this day it has not been built. The potential to be built someday, still exists. Another plan for the Evergreen's connectivity to the Calgary Transit network is the plan to have either an LRT or BRT line built on 162nd Avenue Evergreen's south border. The median's width of it was designed to be a transitway eventually and when completed, there will be a station near the intersection of Eversyde Blvd/Bridleridge Way and 162nd Ave with shopping centres on both sides of 162nd Ave.

== See also ==
- List of neighbourhoods in Calgary
