= Shawnee Slopes, Calgary =

Shawnee Slopes
- Neighbourhood
- Location of Shawnee Slopes in Calgary
- Coordinates: 50°55′29″N 114°04′45″W
- Country: Canada
- Province: Alberta
- City: Calgary
- Quadrant: SW
- Ward: 13
- Established: 1986

Government
  - Mayor: Jeromy Farkas
  - Administrative body: Calgary City Council
  - Councillor: Dan McLean (Communities First)

Area
  - Total: 1.3 km^{2} (0.50 sq mi)
- Elevation: 1,065 m (3,494 ft)

Population (2006)
  - Total: 1,539
  - Average Income: $106,379
- Website: Shawnee Slopes Community Association

Shawnee Slopes is a residential neighbourhood in the southwest quadrant of Calgary, Alberta, Canada. It is bounded to the south by James McKevitt Road, to the east by Macleod Trail, to the north by Fish Creek Provincial Park and to the west by Evergreen Street SW.

It was named for the Shawnee native people. Shawnee Slopes is represented in the Calgary City Council by the Ward 13 councillors.

== Shawnee Slopes Golf Course ==
The Shawnee Slopes Golf Course was developed in the center of the community and was primary amenity for residents and the general public. On 13 June 2011, it was announced that the golf course would permanently close to the public on 2 October 2011. In February 2013, the city council approved the redevelopment of the golf course lands to add 1,400 homes to the community. This community is closely connected with the first-built, the northern section of the neighbouring Evergreen community. Shawnee and this part of Evergreen share the same community association, while the rest of Evergreen is independent.

== Demographics ==
In the City of Calgary's 2012 municipal census, Shawnee Slopes had a population of 1,565 living in 866 dwellings, a 2.4% increase from its 2011 population of 1,529. With a land area of 1.2 km^{2} (0.46 sq mi), it had a population density of 1,300/km^{2} (3,380/sq mi) in 2012.

Residents had a median household income of $106,379 in 2005, with 3.4% of the residents living in low income households. In 2006, 26.9% of residents were immigrants. 12.9% of the buildings were condominiums or apartments and 1.6% of the housing was used for renting.

== Crime ==
Crime Data
Year	Crime Rate (/100 pop.)
2018	2.1
2019	2.1
2020	1.7
2021	1.8
2022	3.8
2023	2.9

== See also ==
- List of neighbourhoods in Calgary
