= Southland Park =

Coordinates: 50.96360°N 114.07322°W

Southland Park is the name of a commercial office complex in Calgary, Alberta, Canada, comprising over 1,000,000 square feet (93,000 m^{2}) of office space and consisting of four separate office buildings. The complex is Calgary's largest suburban office park. The office park is listed by Cushman & Wakefield and managed by Canderel Management (West) Inc.

== Structures ==
Southland Park is located in the Southwood district and comprises four buildings west of Macleod Trail and south of Southland Drive.

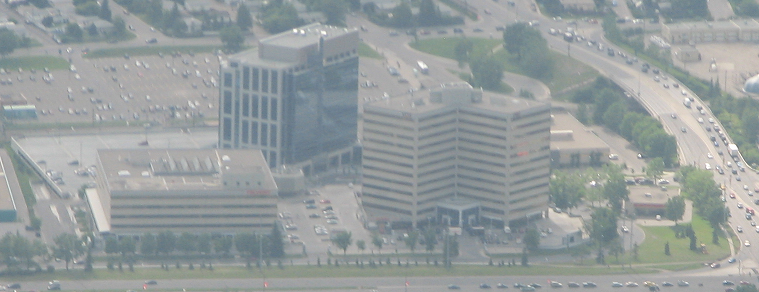
Southland Park, photographed from the east. Macleod Trail is in foreground, Southland Drive runs along the right hand side of the photo. Southport Atrium is largely obscured by Southland Plaza, centre right. Southport Tower is to the left and Southland Atrium at far left.

- Southland Plaza (1978), a 12-story office tower
- Southland Atrium (1980), a 5-story office building
- Southport Atrium (1981), a 2-story low-rise building
- Southport Tower (2008), a 12-story office tower

Approximately 4,000 persons are employed in the four buildings. Alberta Health Services are a major tenant of the complex, with offices located throughout the Park's buildings.

Southport Tower is the first new tower to be built at the south end of Macleod Trail in almost 20 years.

== History ==
Development of Southland Park began in 1978.

The Southport Atrium was previously occupied by Fluor Daniel.

In 2003, Southland Park was declared the Winner of a Building Owners and Managers Association of Calgary (BOMA) Award in the Suburban Office Park (Mid-Rise) category.

In 2009, development of Southland Park was completed with the installation of a pedestrian overpass from the Southport Tower to the Southland LRT station.
