= Maple Ridge, Calgary =

Maple Ridge
- Neighbourhood
- Location of Maple Ridge in Calgary
- Coordinates: 50°57′27″N 114°02′30″W
- Country: Canada
- Province: Alberta
- City: Calgary
- Quadrant: SE
- Ward: 14
- Established: 1966
- Annexed: 1956

Government
  - Mayor: Jeromy Farkas
  - Administrative body: Calgary City Council
  - Councillor: Landon Johnston (Independent)

Area
  - Total: 1.4 km^{2} (0.54 sq mi)
- Elevation: 1,035 m (3,396 ft)

Population (2006)
  - Total: 2,066
  - Average Income: $72,317
- Website: WillowRidge Community Association

Maple Ridge is a residential neighbourhood in the southeast quadrant of Calgary, Alberta. The community is bounded to the east by Deerfoot Trail, north by Southland Drive, west by Willow Park and south by Anderson Road. The Maple Ridge golf course, developed in the Bow River valley, lines the community to the south and east.

It is represented in the Calgary City Council by the Ward 14 councillor and, along with Willow Park, makes up the combined community of WillowRidge.

Maple Ridge is home to the popular Maple Ridge Golf Course, located at 1240 Mapleglade Drive.

== Demographics ==
In the City of Calgary's 2014 municipal census, Maple Ridge had a population of 2,035 living in 810 dwellings.

With a land area of 2.8 km^{2} (1.1 sq mi), it had a population density of 682/km^{2} (1,770/sq mi) in 2012.

Residents in this community had a median household income of $88,417 in 2010.

All buildings are single family detached homes, and in 2000 6.1% of the housing was used for renting.

Schools in the neighborhood:

Maple Ridge Elementary (K-4)

St. William Elementary (K-6)

R.T. Alderman Junior High (5-9)

Willow Park Arts-Centered Learning (Middle School) (5-9)

Notre-Dame-de-la-Paix (French)

Pop. Overtime
Year	Population
2014	1936
2015	1938
2016	1953
2017	1937
2018	1878
2019	1916
2021	1830

== Crime ==
Crime Data
Year	Crime Rate (/100 pop.)
2018	3.2
2019	3.4
2020	1.6
2021	1.4
2022	0.9
2023	1.3

== See also ==
- List of neighbourhoods in Calgary
- R. T. Alderman Junior High
- Willow Park School
