= Midnapore, Calgary =

Midnapore
- Neighbourhood
- Location of Midnapore in Calgary
- Coordinates: 50°54′56″N 114°03′22″W
- Country: Canada
- Province: Alberta
- City: Calgary
- Quadrant: SE
- Ward: 14
- Established: 1977
- Annexed: 1961

Government
  - Mayor: Jeromy Farkas
  - Administrative body: Calgary City Council
  - Councillor: Landon Johnston (Independent)
- Elevation: 1,040 m (3,410 ft)

Population (2011)
  - Total: 6,888
- Website: Midnapore Community Association

Midnapore is a community within the City of Calgary in the province of Alberta, Canada. It is bounded to the north and east by Fish Creek Provincial Park, to the south by Sun Valley Boulevard and to the west by Macleod Trail.

== History ==
Midnapore was once an unincorporated hamlet under the jurisdiction of the Municipal District of Turner Valley No. 32. The Hamlet of Midnapore and adjoining lands were annexed by the City of Calgary on December 30, 1961.

Midnapore Hall was a historic building located on the western edge of the neighborhood along Bannister Road. It opened in 1928 as a municipal building for the Town of Midnapore, and was later converted into a montessori school after the town was incorporated into the city of Calgary. It would undergo a long period of abandonment before being demolished in January 2026 to the dismay of the local community.

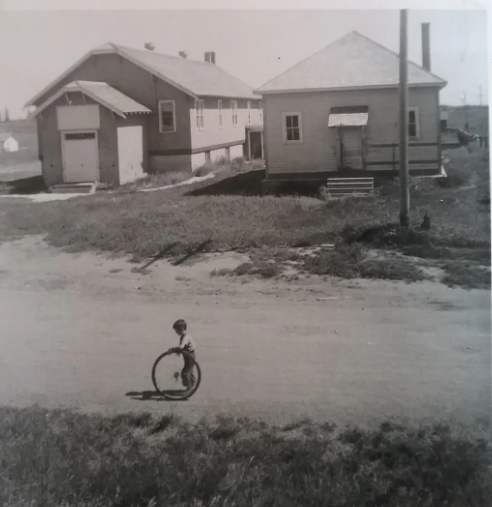
The now demolished historic Midnapore Town Hall circa 1956

Midnapore Mall is a defunct shopping mall turned outdoor shopping plaza located off of MacLeod Trail. The interior portion of the building has since been closed off, but the physical structure of the former mall remains.

== Amenities ==
The community features an artificial lake which is used by residents in summer for water sports and skating among many other activities. Some houses in Midnapore back onto the lake and towards the northern part of the community, houses border onto Fish Creek Provincial Park.

St. Mary's University, a Christian university, is located on the far northern area of Midnapore facing Fish Creek Park.

== Demographics ==
In the City of Calgary's 2012 municipal census, Midnapore had a population of 6,861 living in 2,726 dwellings, a -0.4% increase from its 2011 population of 6,888. With a land area of 2.9 km^{2} (1.1 sq mi), it had a population density of 2,370/km^{2} (6,130/sq mi) in 2012.

Residents in this community had a median household income of $62,067 in 2000, and there were 10% low income residents living in the neighbourhood. As of 2000, 12.3% of the residents were immigrants. A proportion of 14.3% of the buildings were condominiums or apartments, and 25.8% of the housing was used for renting.

Pop. Overtime
Year	Population
2014	6926
2015	7153
2016	7069
2017	7290
2018	7280
2019	7240
2021	6480

== Crime ==
Crime Data
Year	Crime Rate (/100 pop.)
2018	1.9
2019	2.4
2020	1.6
2021	1.1
2022	1.8
2023	1.0

=== Historical Incidents ===
In November 2021, an unknown man entered a Scotiabank branch location located on Midlake Boulevard. It is believed the suspect handed notes to 2 bank tellers with threats, and both bank tellers complied. The suspect then fled the scene on foot.

In September 2022, police were called to a residence located on Bannister Manor for reports of a toddler in medical distress. The toddler would be transported to hospital but would pass away. The victim would be identified as 2 year old Olivia Hayden, and would be deemed as a homicide.

In April 2024, the Calgary Fire Department would be called to Bannister Road for reports of a fire in a detached storage unit in the Midnapore neighborhood. The fire was deemed suspicious, however no formal update has been released on the outcome of the event.

In November 2025, an unknown suspect entered the St. Mary's University campus located on the northern edge of Midnapore bearing a stolen license plate. The suspect then exited their vehicle and used a saw to remove a significant corner piece of a bronze sculpture located on the campus. The suspect then loaded the stolen piece into a vehicle and fled the scene.

== Public Transport ==
Midnapore is located directly next to the Fish Creek-Lacombe CTrain station, with it having pedestrian bridge access over Macleod Trail from Bannister Road to the station. Several bus routes service Midnapore from Fish Creek, Shawnessy, and Somerset-Bridlewood stations.

== Education ==
The community is served by Midnapore Elementary and Fish Creek Elementary public schools, as well as by Mother Teresa of Calcutta Elementary, Father James Whelihan Elementary and Junior High (Catholic), Midsun Junior High School (public) and Trinity Christian School (Christian private).

== Midnapore Lake ==
Midnapore has a community lake; the 12 hectares (30 acres) lake was dredged in the summer of 1976. Around 1,150,000 cubic metres (41,000,000 cubic feet) of earth were moved, some 32,000 cubic metres (1,100,000 cubic feet) of which were used to create a 17 m (56 ft) hill on the adjoining park. The lake contains 625,000,000 L (165,000,000 US gal) of water, to a maximum depth of 10 m (33 ft). The park is used for swimming, boating and fishing in the summer and winter sports.

Homeowners in the community are taxed in the form of encumbrances on their property, which goes toward maintaining the lake.

== See also ==
- List of neighbourhoods in Calgary
