= Parkland, Calgary =

Parkland
- Neighbourhood
- Location of Parkland in Calgary
- Coordinates: 50°55′21″N 114°01′54″W
- Country: Canada
- Province: Alberta
- City: Calgary
- Quadrant: SE
- Ward: 14
- Established: 1974
- Annexed: 1961

Government
  - Mayor: Jeromy Farkas
  - Administrative body: Calgary City Council
  - Councillor: Landon Johnston (Independent)

Area
  - Total: 2.1 km^{2} (0.81 sq mi)
- Elevation: 1,035 m (3,396 ft)

Population (2006)
  - Total: 4,046
  - Average Income: $103,357
- Website: Parkland Community Association

Parkland is a residential neighbourhood in the southeast quadrant of Calgary, Alberta, Canada. It is bounded to the north by Canyon Meadows Drive, to the east by Bow Bottom Trail and to the south and west by Fish Creek Provincial Park.

The land was annexed to the City of Calgary in 1961 and Parkland was established in 1974. It is represented in the Calgary City Council by the Ward 14 councillor.

== Demographics ==
In the City of Calgary's 2012 municipal census, Parkland had a population of 3,785 living in 1,448 dwellings, a 0.3% increase from its 2011 population of 3,772. With a land area of 1.8 km^{2} (0.69 sq mi), it had a population density of 2,100/km^{2} (5,450/sq mi) in 2012.

Residents in this community had a median household income of $103,357 in 2000, and there were 4.8% low income residents living in the neighbourhood. As of 2000, 14.6% of the residents were immigrants. A proportion of 0% of the buildings were condominiums or apartments, and 2.2% of the housing was used for renting.

Pop. Overtime
Year	Population
2014	3769
2015	3780
2016	3677
2017	3685
2018	3682
2019	3660
2021	3430

== Education ==
The community is served by Prince of Wales Elementary public school and St. Philip Elementary School (Catholic).

== See also ==
- List of neighbourhoods in Calgary
