= Willow Park, Calgary =

Willow Park
- Neighbourhood
- Location of Willow Park in Calgary
- Coordinates: 50°57′30″N 114°03′33″W
- Country: Canada
- Province: Alberta
- City: Calgary
- Quadrant: SE
- Ward: 14
- Established: 1965
- Annexed: 1956

Government
  - Mayor: Jeromy Farkas
  - Administrative body: Calgary City Council
  - Councillor: Landon Johnston (Independent)

Area
  - Total: 3.3 km^{2} (1.3 sq mi)
- Elevation: 1,050 m (3,440 ft)

Population (2006)
  - Total: 5,307
  - Average Income: $63,588
- Website: Willow Park Community Association

Willow Park is a residential neighbourhood in the southeast quadrant of Calgary, Alberta. It is bounded to the west by Macleod Trail, to the south by Anderson Road, to the north by Southland Drive and to the east by the community of Maple Ridge. The Willow Park golf course bisects the neighbourhood from west to east, while Fairmont Drive crosses from south to north. Southcentre Mall and Willow Park shopping village are located in the southwest corner of the neighbourhood.

It is represented in the Calgary City Council by the Ward 14 councillor.

== Demographics ==
In the City of Calgary's 2012 municipal census, Willow Park had a population of 5,229 living in 2,282 dwellings, a -1.5% change from its 2011 population of 5,308. With a land area of 3.4 km^{2} (1.3 sq mi), it had a population density of 1,538/km^{2} (3,980/sq mi) in 2012.

Residents in this community had a median household income of $63,588 in 2000, and there were 10.8% low income residents living in the neighbourhood. As of 2000, 15.4% of the residents were immigrants. A proportion of 9.5% of the buildings were condominiums or apartments, and 18.2% of the housing was used for renting.

Pop. Overtime
Year	Population
2014	5440
2015	5423
2016	5353
2017	5356
2018	5295
2019	5328
2021	5050

== Crime ==
Crime Data
Year	Crime Rate (/100)
2018	3.7
2019	5.2
2020	3.3
2021	2.8
2022	3.5
2023	3.3

== Education ==
The community is served by Maple Ridge Elementary, Willow Park Middle School and R.T. Alderman Middle school public schools, as well as by St. William Elementary School (Catholic).

Fred Seymour Elementary School was closed in November 2006, but was later reopened as a French Immersion School.

== Transit ==
Willow Park is served by Calgary Transit Bus Route 99 and 10. The Anderson and Southland CTrain Stations serve Willow Park.

== See also ==
- List of neighbourhoods in Calgary
