= Fairview, Calgary =

Fairview
- Neighbourhood
- Location of Fairview in Calgary
- Coordinates: 50°59′06″N 114°03′38″W
- Country: Canada
- Province: Alberta
- City: Calgary
- Quadrant: SE
- Ward: 11
- Established: 1959
- Annexed: 1956

Government
  - Mayor: Jeromy Farkas
  - Administrative body: Calgary City Council
  - Councillor: Harrison Clark (Independent)

Area
  - Total: 2.1 km^{2} (0.81 sq mi)
- Elevation: 1,065 m (3,494 ft)

Population (2006)
  - Total: 3,660
  - Average Income: $54,116
- Website: Fairview Community Association

Fairview is a residential neighbourhood in the southeast quadrant of Calgary, Alberta. It is bounded to the north by Glenmore Trail to the east by Blackfoot Trail, to the south by Heritage Drive and to the west by Macleod Trail. Fairmount Drive bisects the neighbourhood from north to south and Chinook Centre is located northwest from the community. Fairview features homes built in the late 1950s and early 1960s on what are now considered large lots. Many are in the 1,000 sq ft range with most being bungalows. Many homes are still owned and occupied by the original owners. One of the smaller communities in Calgary with about 1,200 single family homes.

Fairview was annexed by Calgary in 1956. It is represented in the Calgary City Council by the Ward 11 councillor.

== History ==
Together, Fairview and its adjacent counterpart, Fairview Industrial, comprise all of Section 27. There were two original land grants in this section.

William Standish (1851– 1920) and his wife, Ellen Maria (née Greer), homesteaded on the southeast quarter before they eventually relocated to Priddis. The rest of the section was granted to Cordelia Hodder (1851–1893), the first wife of cattleman Edward Hodder (1835–1915). Eventually, the entire section became part of the P. Burns Ranches.

In 1955, before the annexation, a developer proposed buying 540 acres from Burns Ranches and developing it as Meadowbrook. However, the site’s isolation from existing communities complicated the extension of utilities, and the plan was dropped. Kelwood then developed Fairview and part of Fairview Industrial after The City annexed the area. Fairview developed as a residential area with both detached houses and apartment complexes set on curvilinear streets with Fairmount Drive SE separating its two main areas.

While mostly a residential street, Fairmount Drive SE also became the setting of Fairview Shopping Centre (7640 Fairmount Drive SE), Fairview Park (the site of the Fairview Community Association Hall), and both of the neighbourhood’s public schools. Toppler Bowling Lanes, a landmark business in the shopping centre, was one of its original tenants when the mall opened in 1962. Fairview Industrial, a horseshoe-shaped area, surrounds Fairview on three sides, and Farrell Road SE transitions between them.

The industrial district was built on both sides of the CPR tracks, which the LRT line locates between Chinook and Heritage LRT stations. Major business complexes include Fisher Park (1970), Phillips Industrial Mall (1971), and Heritage Hill Plaza (1973). Fairview Industrial also includes the Macleod Trail business strip, where landmark businesses included Lloyd’s Rollercade (7520 Macleod Trail) from 1964 to 2018, and Tom’s House of Pizza (7730 Macleod Trail), part of a locally owned chain, since 1965.

The name of Forge Road in Fairview Industrial was evidently meant to convey the district’s industrial character. Over time, the occupants of its buildings have changed the street’s character. The former industrial bakery at 231 Forge Road SE, built in 1961 to house Honeyboy Bread, became a Moose Lodge in the 1980s and the Hungarian Canadian Cultural Association in the 1990s. The next building to the west, 134 Forge Road SE, was built in 1967 and in 2017 became the headquarters of Chabad Lubavitch of Alberta, part of a worldwide Hasidic Jewish movement. The Canadian Turkish Cultural & Islamic Center, the Calgary Korean Association, and the Markin Centre and the Ann McCaig Centre, which house the Alberta Adolescent Recovery Centre, are all located in Fairview Industrial.

=== East Fairview Industrial (1979) ===
James D. Geddes homesteaded in Section 23, roughly where the Meadows Mile development now stands. The north area was originally granted to the Hudson’s Bay Company. The southwest quarter, where Wal-Mart and Superstore now stand, became part of Ex-Sheriff King’s ranch, and was subdivided it in the pre-First World War boom as Kingsland Park at the same time he subdivided and named the community of Kingsland. Both names almost certainly derive from his own. The boom ended in 1913, and Kingsland Park was not developed.

The entire area eventually became part of P. Burns Ranches. It was the site of a grain elevator that was destroyed by fire three times (in 1945, 1958, and 1959), and it is almost certainly the original location of the Burns Barn that was moved to Heritage Park Heritage Communities Local Area Plan - November 2021 10 in 1977. Industrial development began in 1940, when the federal government acquired a 200-acre parcel from Burns in the service of Canada’s Second World War effort. To meet wartime demand for explosives, Ottawa established Alberta Nitrogen Products Limited and built its massive ammonia and ammonium nitrate plant. The Consolidated Mining and Smelting Company of Canada provided operational support. The $10-million complex was the largest ammonia plant in the country and the largest manufacturing enterprise in the province. Both the CPR and Canadian National Railways extended leads to serve the plant, and it became operational in 1941. Before long, alternative materials for explosives manufacture were developed, and in 1943 the plant was partly converted to produce fertilizers. After the war, Ottawa sold the complex to Cominco (as Consolidated Mining and Smelting was eventually renamed) which operated it as a fertilizer plant.

The Calgary Plan (1973) identified the district as an industrial area, and East Fairview Industrial was established in 1979. But the district’s industrial character has been almost completely replaced. Cominco closed two-thirds of its operation in 1987 and the remainder in 1994, and its complex was demolished and the railway line removed. Since the 1970s, East Fairview Industrial has been largely built up with low-rise retail structures. All that remains of the area’s industrial character is Rolling Mix Concrete (which has operated at 7209 Railway Street SE since at least the early 1970s), the name Railway Street, and the 2002 archaeological study of the fertilizer plant’s remains.

A decade after the fertilizer plant closed, Heritage Partners, a Canadian-American investment group, redeveloped the site as Deerfoot Meadows, a massive open-air retail complex on a 140-hectare site. Anchor tenant IKEA opened in 2004. The developer is expected to transfer a 44-acre parcel along the Bow River as a wildlife preserve following review and contaminant remediation. Heritage Partners planned to expand Deerfoot Meadows to include The Bluffs, comprising office and luxury residential towers on the ridge below Blackfoot Trail, and the Village at the Deerfoot Meadows, a high-end shopping complex north of the existing mall. However, the expansion did not proceed, and the area remain undeveloped.

== Demographics ==
In the City of Calgary's 2012 municipal census, Fairview had a population of 3,623 living in 1,606 dwellings, a 2% increase from its 2011 population of 3,552. With a land area of 1.3 km^{2} (0.50 sq mi), it had a population density of 2,790/km^{2} (7,220/sq mi) in 2012.

Residents in this community had a median household income of $54,116 in 2000, and there were 17.1% low income residents living in the neighbourhood. As of 2000, 17.7% of the residents were immigrants. A proportion of 18.9% of the buildings were condominiums or apartments, and 27.9% of the housing was used for renting.

Pop. Overtime
Year	Population
2014	3837
2015	3830
2016	3847
2017	3686
2018	3708
2019	3646
2021	3675

== Education ==
The community is served by Le Roi Daniels and Fairview schools, both public schools hosting the Traditional Learning Centre alternative program, as well as by West Island College (private).

== Transit ==
Fairview is served Calgary Transit Bus Route 10. The Heritage CTrain Station serves Fairview.

== See also ==
- List of neighbourhoods in Calgary
