= Anderson Road (Calgary) =

Street in Calgary, Alberta, Canada

- Former name(s): 114 Avenue S
- Maintained by: City of Calgary
- Length: 9.2 km (5.7 mi)
- Location: Calgary
- West end: Tsuut'ina Trail
- Major junctions: 14 Street SW; Macleod Trail
- East end: Deerfoot Trail (Highway 2) / Bow Bottom Trail

Anderson Road is a major expressway in the southern part of Calgary, Alberta, Canada. It runs from the city limits at Tsuut'ina Trail in the west to Deerfoot Trail in the east. The road continues westwards into the Tsuu T'ina Nation as Buffalo Run Boulevard. It is one of the few entrances to the Tsuu T'ina Nation and the only entrance from Calgary that must remain open at all times.

== History ==
Anderson Road is named for the Anderson family, specifically for Andrew Anderson and Archie Anderson, two brothers who served with the Royal Canadian Navy and the Canadian Armed Forces, respectively, in World War II. Archie was a radio operator/loader in the King's Own Calgary Tank Regiment, was part of the Dieppe Raid on August 19, 1942, and had also spent time as a German prisoner of war, The Anderson family home had been located on what is now Anderson Road, just west of 24 Street SW. Descendants of the Anderson family continue to live in the Calgary area and other parts of Alberta.

Prior to the road being named in their honour, Anderson Road conformed to Calgary's street numbering convention, and was known as 114 Avenue S, which it where it lies in the grid. Anderson Road was originally to be the south leg of the Calgary Ring Road; however as the city grew the proposed alignment was moved south to Highway 22X (which lies at 178 Avenue S. in the grid). Prior to Deerfoot Trail being extended to Stoney Trail South, Anderson Road between Macleod Trail and Deerfoot Trail was designated as part of Highway 2 but is still part of bypass route which connects Highway 1 west and Highway 2 south.

== Major intersections ==
From west to east. The entire route is in Calgary.

km	mi	Destinations	Notes
0.0	0.0	Buffalo Run Boulevard	Continues south
0.0	0.0	Tsuut'ina Trail (Highway 201)	Interchange, exit 17 on Hwy 201
1.6	0.99	24 Street SW	
2.2	1.4	Woodpark Boulevard	
3.2	2.0	14 Street SW to Highway 1 west	
3.9	2.4	Elbow Drive	
4.9	3.0	Macleod Trail south to Highway 2A	Partial cloverleaf interchange (traffic signals); passes Anderson station
5.3	3.3	Southcentre Mall access	Westbound exit
5.6	3.5	Bonaventure Drive	Access to Southcentre Mall
6.9	4.3	Acadia Drive	
7.7– 9.2	4.8– 5.7	Deerfoot Trail (Highway 2) / Bow Bottom Trail	Interchange, exit 243 on Hwy 2
1.000 mi = 1.609 km; 1.000 km = 0.621 mi: Incomplete access; Route transition

== See also ==
- Transportation in Calgary
