= Southcentre Mall =

Shopping mall in Calgary, Alberta, Canada

Southcentre
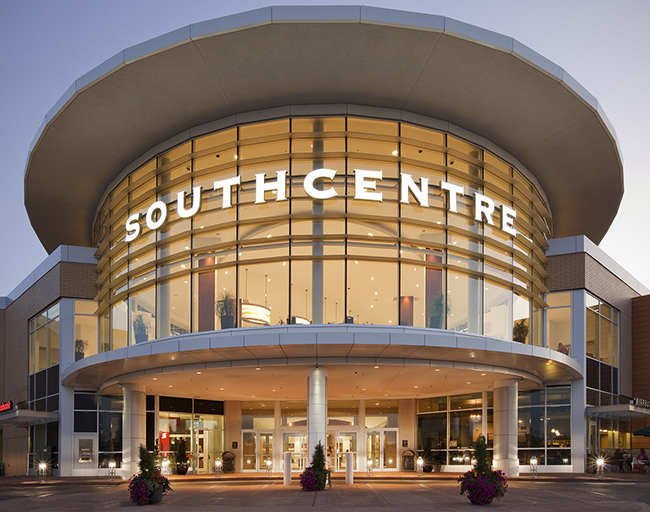
- Southcentre Mall in 2009
- Coordinates: 50°57′10″N 114°03′56″W
- Address: 100 Anderson Road SE; Calgary, Alberta; T2J 3V1
- Opened: October 1974
- Manager: Oxford Properties
- Owner: Oxford Properties
- Num. of stores: 191
- Num. of anchor tenants: 5 (major); 3 (junior)
- Floor area: 97,743.9 m^{2} (1,052,107 sq ft)
- Floors: 2
- Public transit: Anderson station
- Website: www.southcentremall.com

Southcentre is one of the largest (by area) shopping malls in Calgary, Alberta, Canada, 97,743.9 m^{2} (1,052,107 sq ft), and contains approximately 190 stores and services over two floors.

It is located in the city's southeast quadrant at the intersection of Macleod Trail and Anderson Road, and across the street from the Anderson C-Train Station, in the neighbourhood of Willow Park. The mall is owned and operated by Oxford Properties.

== History ==
Originally opened in October 1974, the mall was expanded in 1986. In 1988, further expansion added a two-level retail wing to the north side. In late 1999, the mall grew again to include a new 3-level department store (planned as Eaton's but ultimately opened as Sears), approximately 20 retailers, and a two-level parkade. The theatre complex was closed at this time and retrofitted into retail space. The most recent expansion was completed in 2009 when the south entrance to the mall was redesigned and a Crate & Barrel opened up.

In 2012, it became the first mall to offer private visits with Santa Claus to children with autism.

In June 2015, the North entrance that was closed off back in 2009 was redesigned into a Sporting Life, adding a 4th major anchor tenant to the mall.

In January 2018, Sears closed down following the company's bankruptcy. Soon after, Showhome Furniture opened in the ground floor space vacated by Sears and closed as of November 2019. In July 2020, Oxford Properties announced that Dollarama, PetSmart, and Winners would open stores on the vacant ground floor space as part of an ongoing redevelopment project. Dollarama officially opened in November 2020, while PetSmart and Winners opened in Spring 2021, with Winners opening on April 21.

It was also announced in 2023 that the third floor of the old Sears would be redesigned into an entertainment space. This space eventually opened up as Powerplay.

== Anchor tenants ==
- Crate & Barrel (formerly Indigo)
- Dollarama, (formerly Sears)
- Decathlon, (formerly Sears)
- PetSmart, (formerly Sears)
- Power Play, (formerly Sears)
- Shoppers Drug Mart
- Sporting Life
- Winners, (formerly Sears)

=== Former tenants ===
- Hudson's Bay (closed June 1, 2025)
- Indigo Books and Music (now Crate & Barrel)
- Sears (closed 2018, replaced by Showhome Furniture)
- Showhome Furniture (temporary tenant for Sears, now various stores)

=== Future tenants ===
- Walmart (formerly Hudson's Bay, opening 2028)

== See also ==
- List of shopping malls in Canada
- Chinook Centre
