= Fish Creek Provincial Park =

Park in Calgary, Alberta, Canada

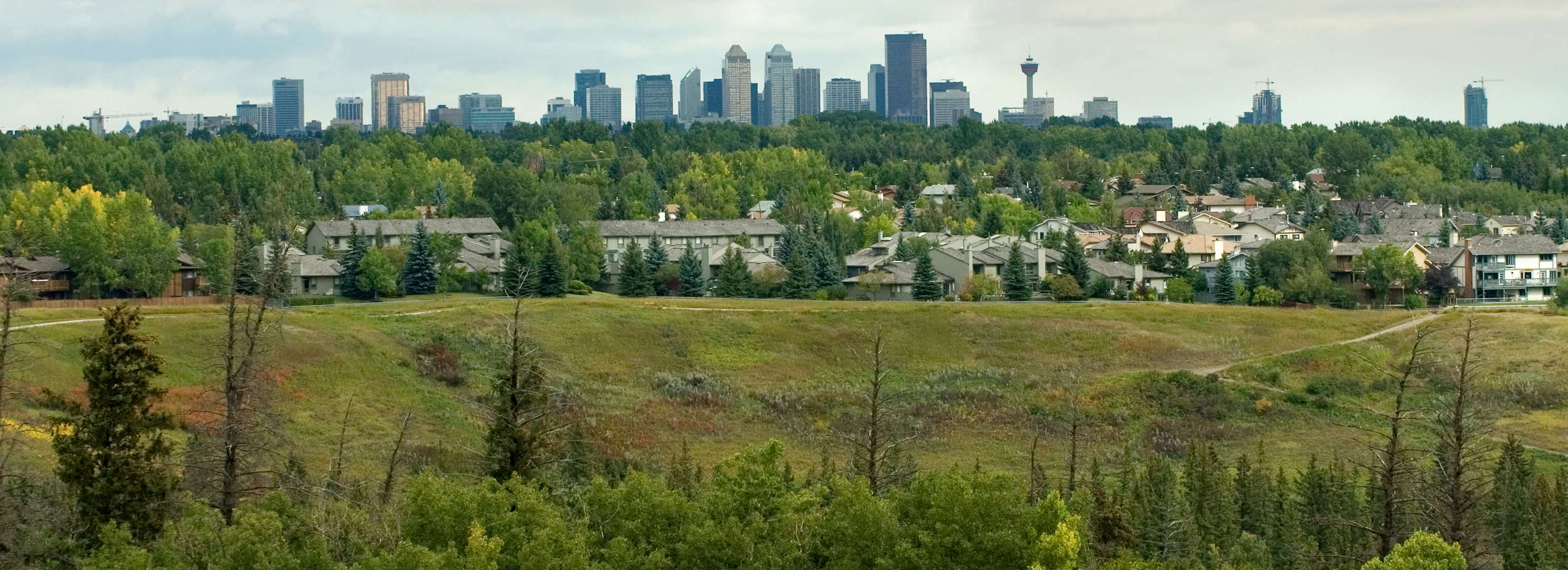
- Fish Creek Park

- Location within Calgary
- Interactive map of Fish Creek Provincial Park
- Location: Calgary, Alberta, Canada
- Coordinates: 50°55′18″N 114°03′30″W
- Area: 13.48 km^{2} (5.20 sq mi)
- Established: June 10, 1975
- Governing body: Alberta Environment and Parks

Fish Creek Park is an urban provincial park that preserves the valley of Fish Creek in the southern part of Calgary, Alberta, Canada. It is bordered on three sides by the city, and on the west by the territory of the Tsuu T’ina Nation (Sarcee), a First Nation.

Much of the park remains in a natural, forested state. Fish Creek flows throughout its length, joining the Bow River on the east side of the park, and there is an artificial lake that offers swimming. With more than 100 kilometres (62 mi) of paved and unpaved trails, the park is a popular area for hiking and biking, as well as for picnicking, swimming, fishing, and observing wildlife.

Fish Creek Park is the second-largest urban park in Canada after Rouge National Urban Park in the Greater Toronto Area, Ontario, and followed by Pippy Park in St. John's, Newfoundland and Labrador. It is also one of the largest urban parks in North America, stretching 19 km (12 mi) from east to west. With an area of 13.48 km^{2} (5.20 sq mi), it is more than three times the size of Vancouver's Stanley Park.

== Amenities ==
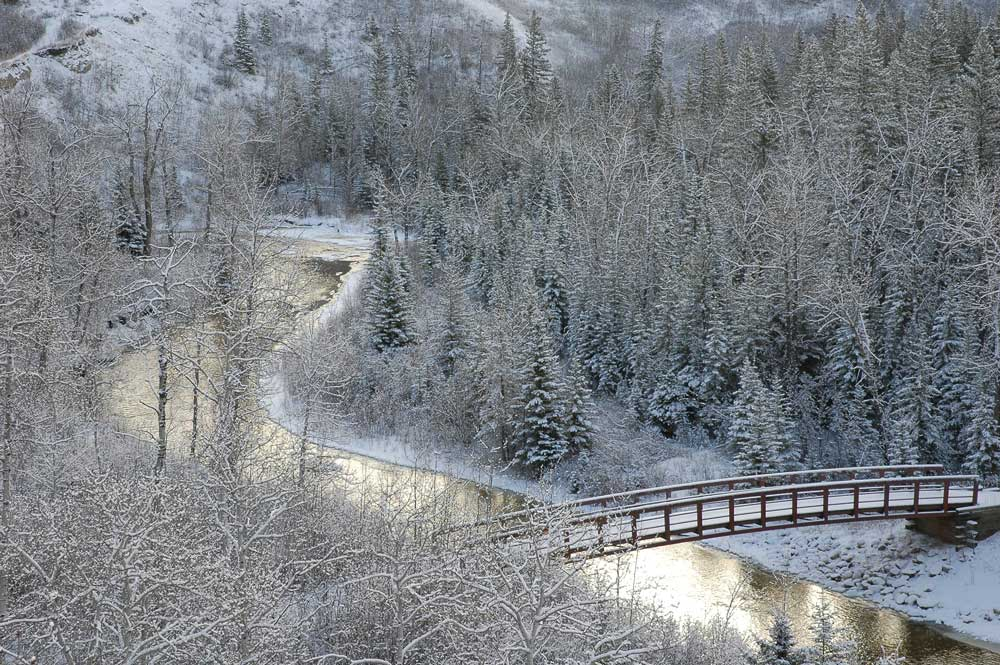
Bridge over Fish Creek

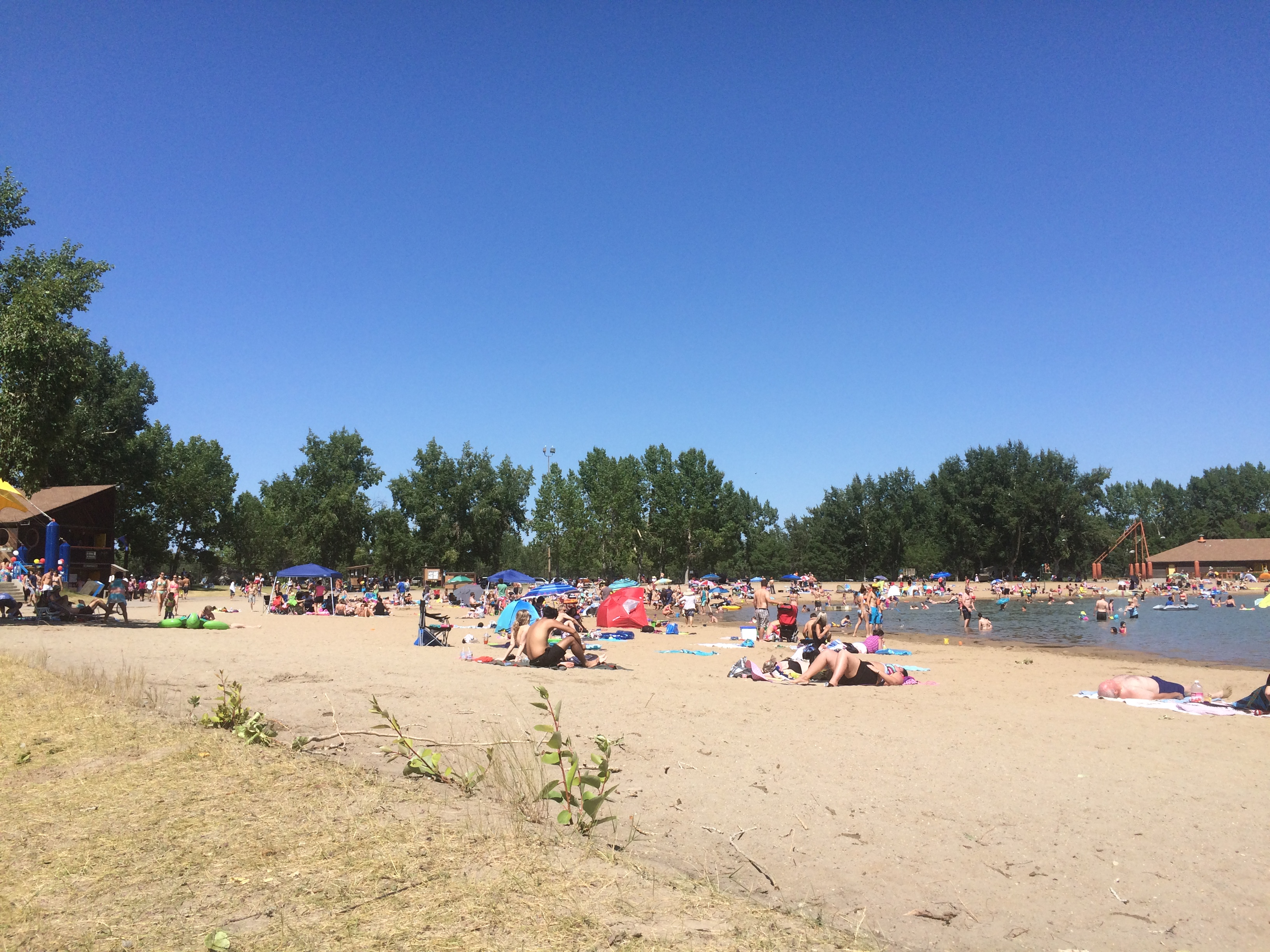
The beach at Sikome Lake

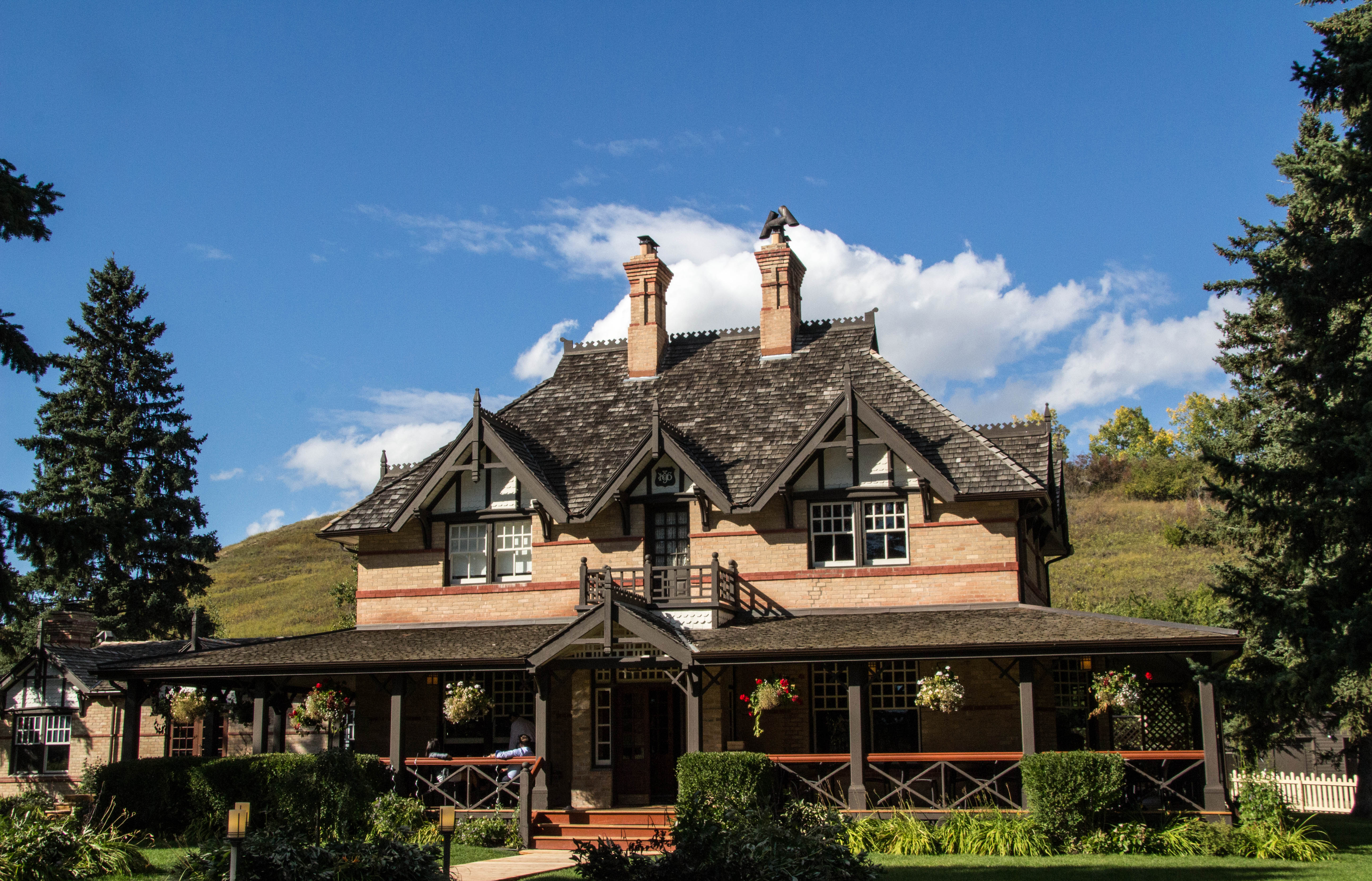
Bow Valley Ranche House (William Roper Hull Ranche House) in the park

Fish Creek Park features more than 100 kilometres (62 mi) of trails for walking, hiking and biking, of which more than 60 kilometres (37 mi) are paved. These trails connect the park to Calgary's extensive pathway system, and the Trans Canada Trail passes through the park along the Bow River.

Facilities at the park include a visitor centre, an environmental learning centre, picnic shelters, group day-use areas, a restaurant, concession stands, the Sikome Lake Aquatic Centre, a boat launch at the Bow River, and the Mackenzie Meadows Golf Course. Swimming is permitted at Sikome Lake, and fishing is permitted in Fish Creek and the Bow River. Much of the park is forested and is home to a variety of natural wildlife, including deer, coyotes, owls, and beavers, as well as several species of garter snakes and frogs. More than 200 bird species have been seen in the park, including great blue herons.

== Geologic setting ==
The Fish Creek valley was formed at the end of the last Ice Age, carved by meltwater from retreating glaciers in the mountains to the west. Fish Creek itself is now an underfit stream; that is, its current flow rates are not great enough to have carved the valley through which it flows.

The bedrock exposed in the lower parts of the valley consists of sandstones, siltstones, and mudstones of early Paleocene age. They belong to the upper part of the Willow Creek Formation, which grades into the upper Scollard Formation in the Calgary area.

The unconsolidated sediments that overlie the bedrock are exposed in some of the cliffs along the upper edges of the valley. They may include glacial till at the base, overlain by post-glacial stream deposits, loess, and paleosols, and are topped by recent soil horizons. The Mazama Ash, a layer of white volcanic ash a few centimetres thick, can be seen within these sediments in a few places. The Mazama Ash was produced during the eruption that formed Crater Lake in south-central Oregon. It was spread to the north and east by the prevailing winds, and remnants of it have been identified as far east as the Greenland ice sheet.

== Contemporary issues ==
As a result of the heavy rains and floods experienced by Alberta in June 2005, half of the park's trails were washed away, and the other half damaged. Seven pedestrian bridges over the Fish Creek were destroyed and seven others were rendered unsafe. The park officially reopened in September 2007 following the construction of new bridges and a redesigned pathway system. The park was again damaged by severe flooding in June 2013, necessitating the clearing of debris and further repairs and upgrading to the bridges and pathways.

== Friends of Fish Creek ==
The Friends of Fish Creek Provincial Park Society is a non-profit, volunteer society that delivers programs such as trail maintenance, courses such as bird watching, events such as the Ghost Tour and activities such as park tours throughout the year to help create informed users and preserve the ecological integrity of the park. They provide Wellness programs including yoga, guided meditation and running clinics to help people relax, rejuvenate and reconnect with nature in Fish Creek. Their office is located in the cookhouse near the Bow Valley Visitor Centre.

== See also ==
- List of provincial parks in Alberta
- List of Canadian provincial parks
- List of National Parks of Canada
