= 17 Avenue SW (Calgary) =

Major east–west arterial road in Calgary, Alberta

- Length: 12.5 km (7.8 mi)
- Location: Calgary City and Rocky View County, Alberta, Canada
- East end: Florence LaDue Way / Macleod Trail in Calgary
- Major junctions: Highway 201 / 101 Street SW in Calgary
- West end: Lower Springbank Road near Calgary

17 Avenue SW is a major east–west arterial road in the southwest quadrant of the city of Calgary, Alberta.

Between the Calgary Stampede Grounds and 14 Street SW, it is a commercial street—with bars, restaurants, nightclubs, and shops—which has been designated a Business Revitalization Zone, officially named 17th Ave Retail and Entertainment District.

From 14th Street to Sarcee Trail, it is flanked by a mix of residential and commercial space, with small strip malls, a retirement home, and denser commercial developments in the Westbrook Mall area. West of Sarcee Trail, it runs through suburban neighbourhoods and acreages, by Rundle College and Westside Recreation Centre.

The west extension of the C-Train light rail transit system runs along 17 Avenue west of 33 Street SW, as does the rapid bus transit.

== Red Mile ==
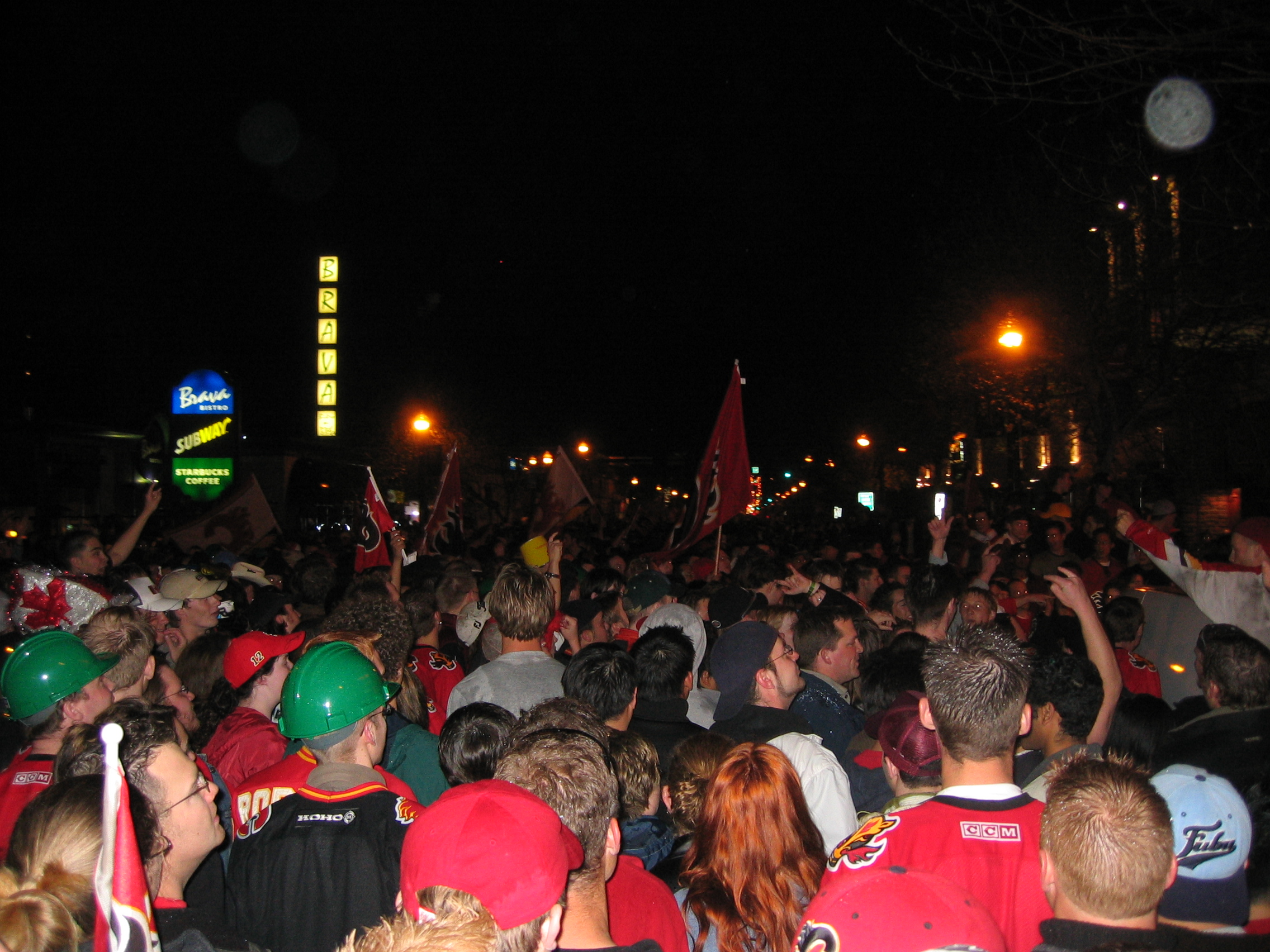
Typical celebration along the Red Mile

17th Avenue was nicknamed the "Red Mile" in 2004 during the playoff run of Calgary's NHL team, the Calgary Flames. During this time, it was not uncommon to see over 100,000 fans crowding the street and its bars and pubs on game nights.. The block has become the unofficial gathering place for Calgary Flames fans, with many celebrating in the street during their last playoff run in 2015. The street also "dead-ends" at the Stampede Grounds on its east side and is thus central to the party-like atmosphere that overtakes the city during the Calgary Stampede festival.

== Major intersections ==
From east to west.

County	Location	km	mi	Destinations	Notes
City of Calgary		0.0	0.0	Florence LaDue Way	Access to Stampede Park and Victoria Park/Stampede station
City of Calgary		0.0	0.0	Macleod Trail	One-way, northbound
City of Calgary		0.2	0.12	1 Street SE (to Macleod Trail south)	One-way, southbound
City of Calgary		0.4	0.25	Centre Street S	
City of Calgary		0.9	0.56	4 Street SW	
City of Calgary		1.1	0.68	5 Street SW	
City of Calgary		1.6	0.99	8 Street SW	
City of Calgary		2.5	1.6	14 Street SW	
City of Calgary		3.7	2.3	Richmond Road (to Crowchild Trail north)	Functions as ramps for Crowchild Trail partial cloverleaf interchange
City of Calgary		4.1	2.5	24 Street SW (to Crowchild Trail south)	Functions as ramps for Crowchild Trail partial cloverleaf interchange
City of Calgary		5.4	3.4	33 Street SW	Access to Westbrook station
City of Calgary		5.8	3.6	37 Street SW	
City of Calgary		6.6	4.1	45 Street SW	45th Street SW station
City of Calgary		7.3– 7.6	4.5– 4.7	Sarcee Trail	Partial cloverleaf interchange
City of Calgary		7.9	4.9	Sirroco Drive / Costello Boulevard	Sirocco station
City of Calgary		9.2	5.7	69 Street SW	69th Street SW station
City of Calgary		10.9	6.8	85 Street SW	
Calgary City–Rocky View County border		11.3– 11.7	7.0– 7.3	Highway 201 (Stoney Trail)	Interchange; Highway 201 exit 30; northbound exit and southbound entrance
Calgary City–Rocky View County border		11.7	7.3	101 Street SW	
Rocky View		12.4	7.7	Lower Springbank Road	Roundabout
1.000 mi = 1.609 km; 1.000 km = 0.621 mi: Incomplete access

== See also ==
- Transportation in Calgary
