= Glendale, Calgary =

Glendale
- Neighbourhood
- Location of Glendale in Calgary
- Coordinates: 51°01′59″N 114°09′10″W
- Country: Canada
- Province: Alberta
- City: Calgary
- Quadrant: SW
- Ward: 6
- Established: 1955
- Annexed: 1956

Government
  - Mayor: Jeromy Farkas
  - Administrative body: Calgary City Council
  - Councillor: John Pantazopoulos (Independent)

Area
  - Total: 1.3 km^{2} (0.50 sq mi)
- Elevation: 1,150 m (3,770 ft)

Population (2006)
  - Total: 2,770
  - Average Income: $55,400
- Postal code: T3E
- Website: Glendale Community Association

Glendale is a residential neighbourhood in the southwest quadrant of Calgary, Alberta. It is located south of 17th Avenue SW, east of Sarcee Trail and Signal Hill and west of 37 Street SW and Killarney. The Optimist Athletic Park is located in this community.

It is represented in the Calgary City Council by the Ward 6 councillor.

The 45 Street CTrain Station is located on the northern portion of the community, with it being directly on the community boundary between Glendale and Westgate.

== Demographics ==
In the City of Calgary's 2012 municipal census, Glendale had a population of 2,749 living in 1,111 dwellings, a 0.7% increase from its 2011 population of 2,730. With a land area of 1.4 km^{2} (0.54 sq mi), it had a population density of 1,960/km^{2} (5,090/sq mi) in 2012.

Residents in this community had a median household income of $55,400 in 2000, and there were 10.2% low income residents living in the neighbourhood. As of 2000, 18% of the residents were immigrants. A proportion of 9.1% of the buildings were condominiums or apartments, and 20.1% of the housing was used for renting.

== Crime ==
Crime Data
Year	Crime Rate (/100)
2018	2.7
2019	3.5
2020	3.7
2021	3.1
2022	3.8
2023	2.8

== Education ==
The community is served by Glendale Elementary and Glenmeadow Elementary public schools, as well as by St. Gregory Junior High (Catholic).

== See also ==
- List of neighbourhoods in Calgary
