= Barlow/Max Bell station =

Light rail station in Calgary, Alberta, Canada

Barlow / Max Bell
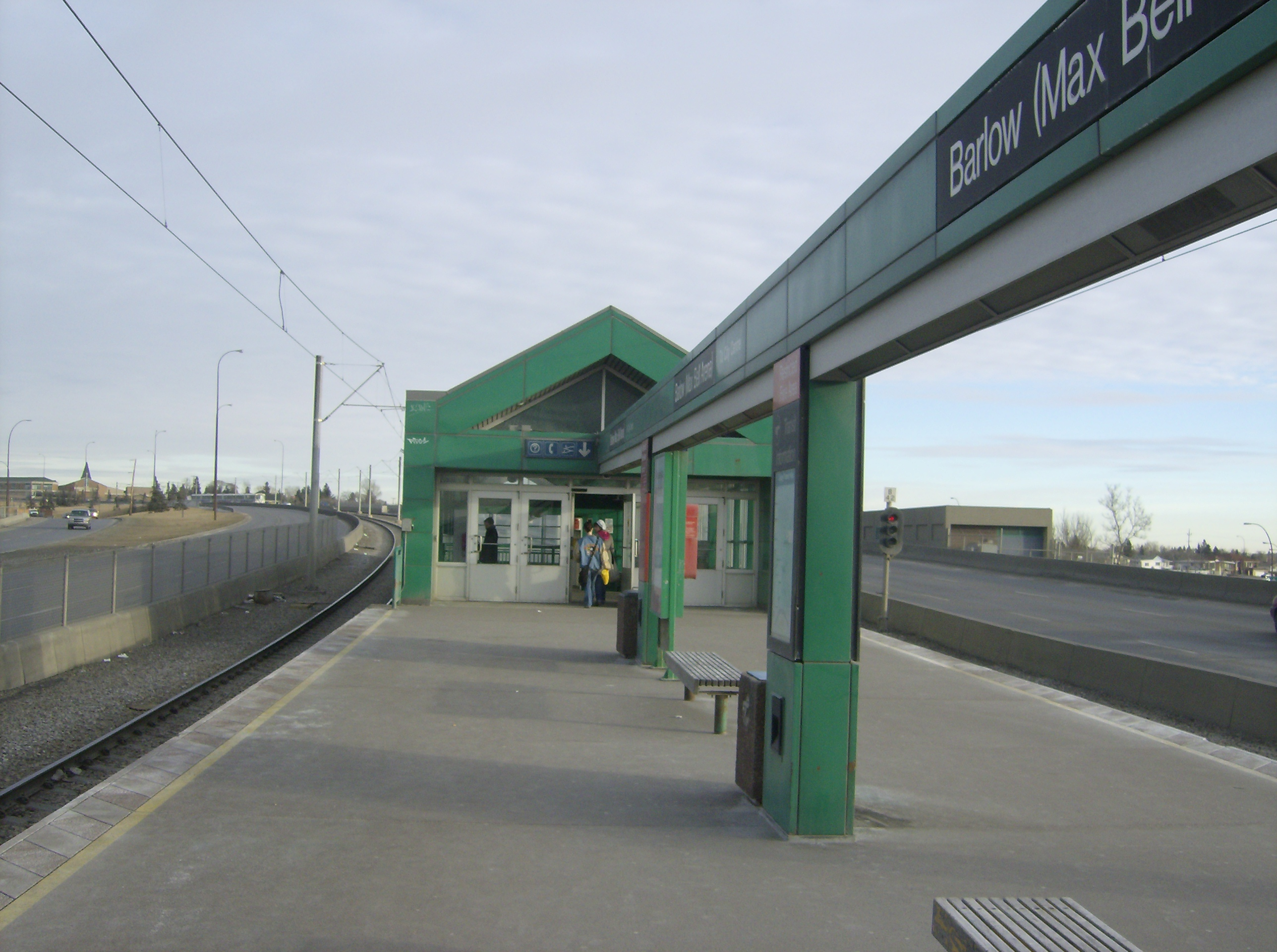

General information
- Location: 2022 Memorial Drive SE
- Coordinates: 51°02′44″N 114°00′25″W
- Owner: Calgary Transit
- Platforms: Center-loading platform
- Connections: 33 Vista Heights; 127 Maryvale

Construction
- Structure type: At-grade
- Accessible: yes

History
- Opened: 1985; 41 years ago
- Rebuilt: 2014; 12 years ago
- Former names: Barlow (Max Bell Arena)

Services
Preceding station	Calgary Transit	Following station
Zoo toward 69 Street	Blue Line	Franklin toward Saddletowne
Location

Barlow/Max Bell station is a CTrain light rail station in Calgary, Alberta, Canada. It serves the Northeast Line (Route 202). It opened on April 27, 1985, as part of the original Northeast line. It is located in the Southeast quadrant of Calgary, in the neighbourhood of Albert Park/Radisson Heights.

The station is located in the median of Memorial Drive Southeast, near the intersection with 19 Street Northeast. The station is 3.9 km from the City Hall Interlocking.

The station's centre-loading (island) platform is accessed via ramps from a pedestrian tunnel under Memorial Drive. Barlow/Max Bell and Zoo are the only stations in the system that are constructed this way.

In 2005, the station registered an average transit of 1,600 boardings per weekday.

== Station upgrades ==
As part of Calgary Transit's plan to operate 4-car trains by the end of 2014, all 3-car platforms were extended, and Barlow/Max Bell station also received new furnishings in addition to a platform extension. Construction took place in 2014.

== Transit connections ==
Bus connections as of 22 June, 2026:

- 33 - Rundle
- 127 - Maryvale/Marlborough
