= CTrain =

Light rail transit system in Calgary, Alberta

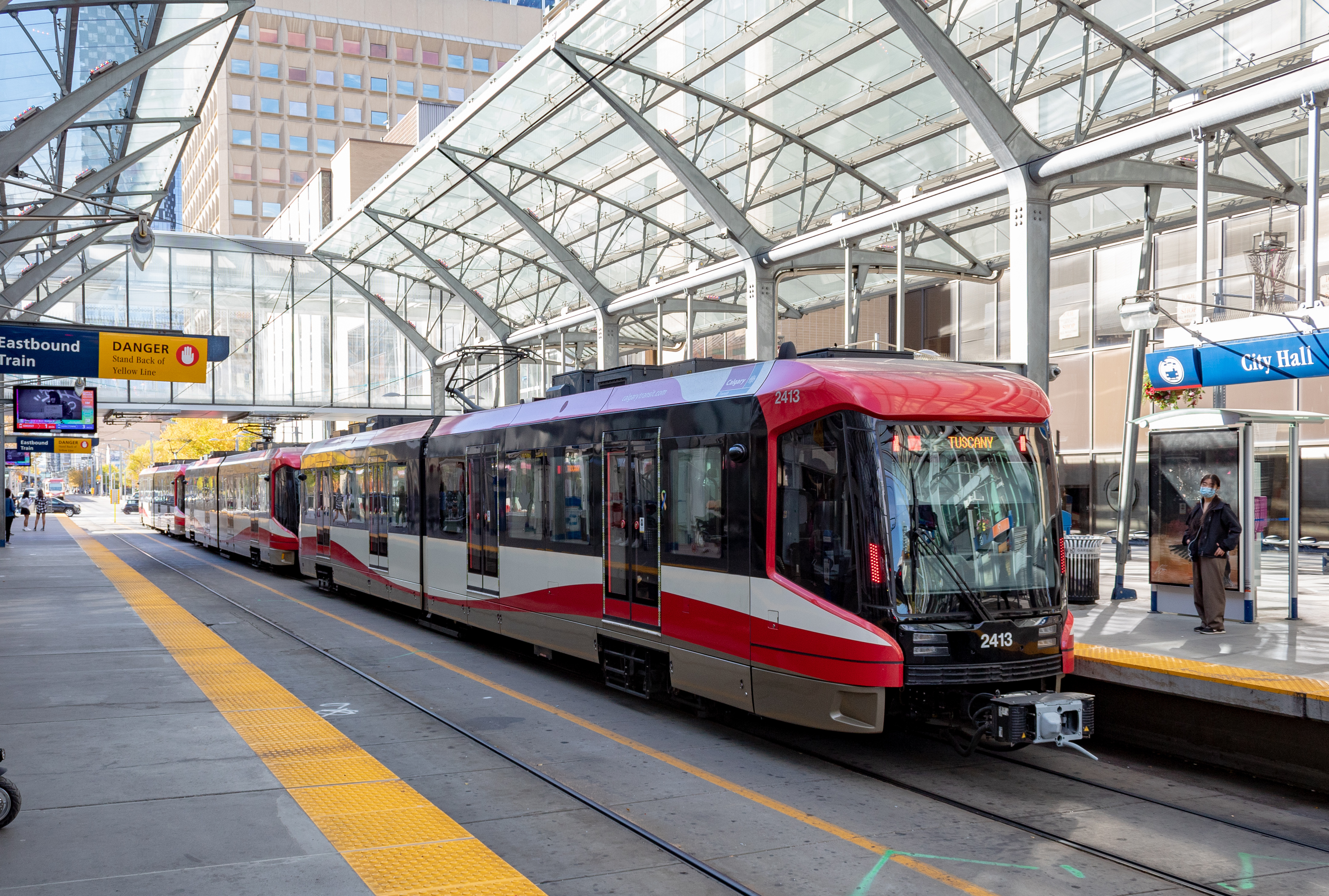
- A Siemens S200 at City Hall station

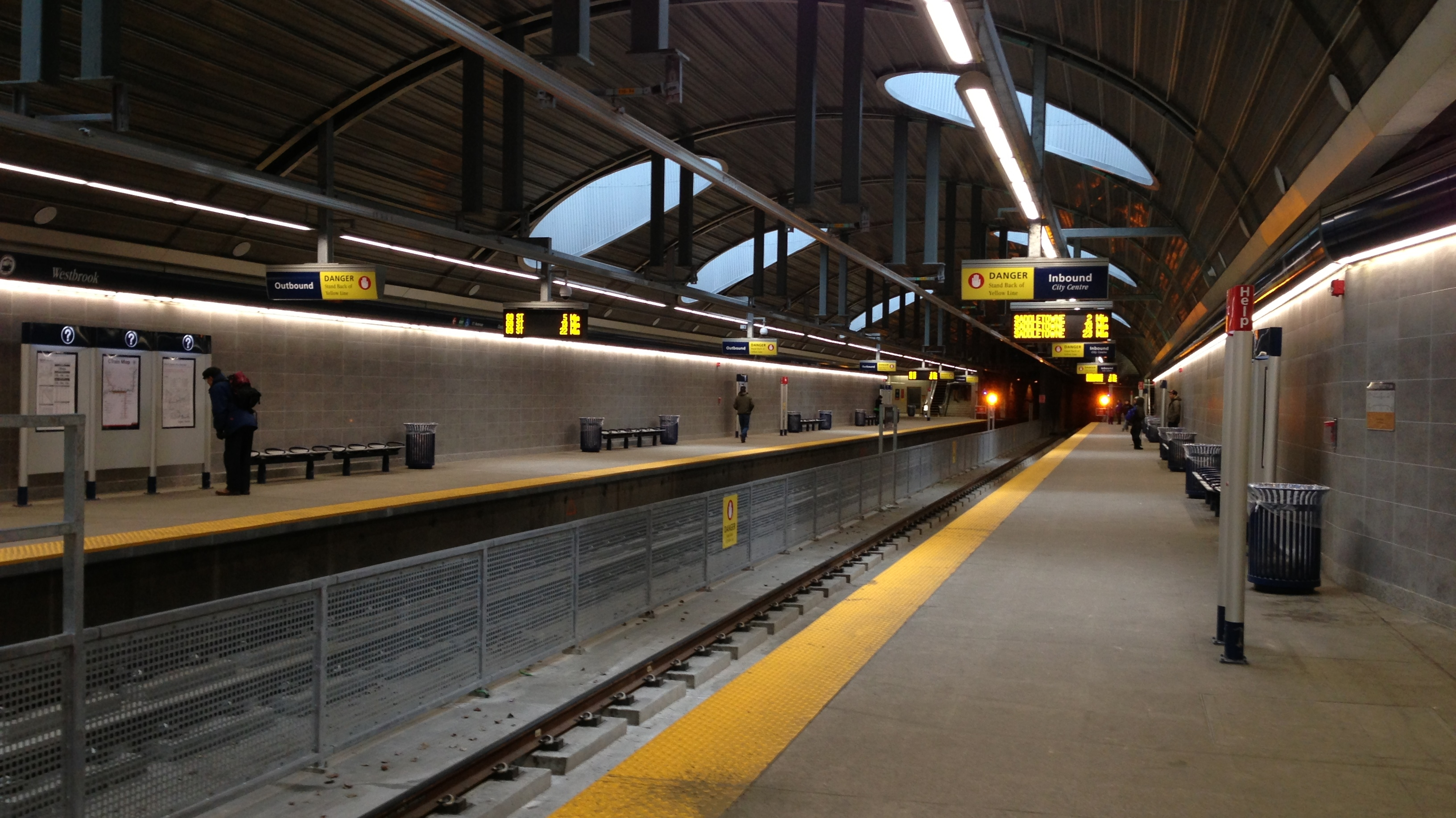
- Westbrook Station on the Blue Line

Overview
- Owner: Calgary Transit
- Locale: Calgary, Alberta, Canada
- Transit type: Light rail
- Number of lines: 2 (third under construction)
- Number of stations: 45 (10 under construction)
- Daily ridership: 156,100 (weekdays, Q2 2026)
- Annual ridership: 94,097,200 (2025)
- Website: calgarytransit.com

Operation
- Began operation: May 25, 1981; 45 years ago
- Train length: 3 or 4 cars

Technical
- System length: 59.9 km (37.2 mi)
- Track gauge: 1,435 mm (4 ft 8 1/2 in) standard gauge
- Electrification: Overhead line, 600 V DC
System map
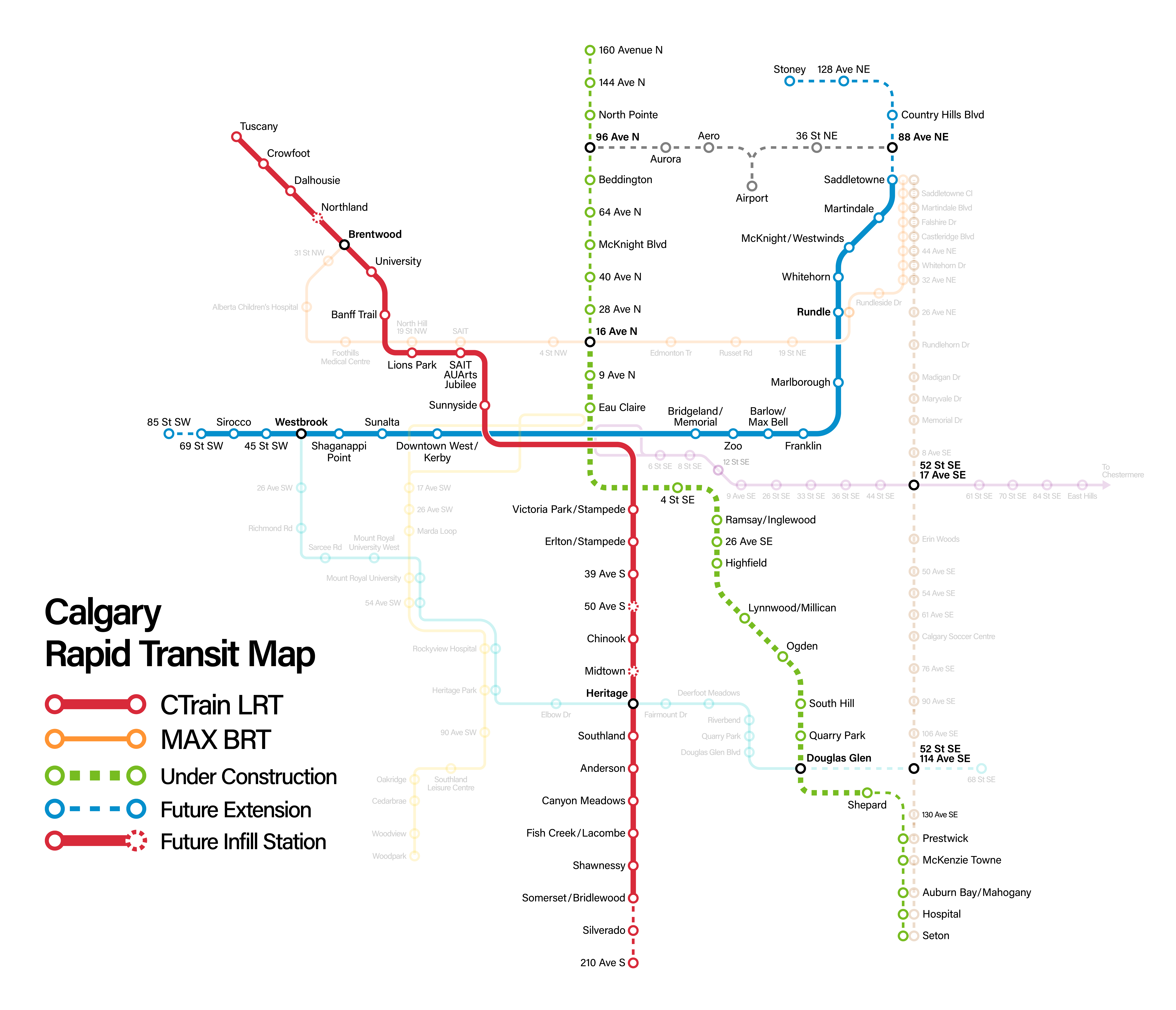

CTrain (previously branded C-Train) is a light rail system in Calgary, Alberta, Canada. The system is operated by Calgary Transit as part of the Calgary municipal government's transportation department, and currently consists of two lines; the Red Line and the Blue Line.

The CTrain began operation on May 25, 1981, and has expanded as the city has increased in population. In 2025, the system had a ridership of 94,097,200, or about 156,100 per weekday as of the second quarter of 2026, making it one of the busiest light rail transit systems in North America.

== History ==
The idea for rail transit in Calgary originated in a 1967 Calgary transportation study, which recommended a two-line metro system to enter service in 1978. The original plans had called for two lines:

- a northwest-to-south line (on a similar routing to the present-day Northwest and South lines) between the original Banff Trail station (at Crowchild Trail and Northland Drive, between the present-day Brentwood and Dalhousie stations) and Southwood station (at Southland Drive, roughly at the location of the present-day Southland station, with five stations in downtown underneath 7 Avenue; and
- the west line, which ran from downtown to the community of Glendale, primarily along the 26 Avenue SW corridor.

A third line, a north central line running from downtown to Thorncliffe mostly along Centre Street was also envisioned but was thought to be beyond the scope of the study.

However, a building boom in the 1970s had caused the heavy rail concept to fall out of favour due to the increased costs of construction, with light rail as its replacement. Light rail rapid transit (LRRT) was chosen over dedicated busways and the expansion of the Blue Arrow bus service (a service similar to bus rapid transit today) because light rail has lower long-term operating costs and addressed traffic congestion problems. The Blue Arrow service ended in 2000.

The present-day CTrain originated in a 1975 plan, calling for the construction of a single line, from the downtown core (8 Street station) to Anderson Road (the present-day Anderson station). The plan was approved by City Council in May 1977, with the construction of what would become the C-Train's "South Line" beginning one month later. The South Line opened on May 25, 1981. Oliver Bowen, a descendant of original black settlers to Amber Valley, Alberta Obadiah Bowen and Willis Reese Bowen, was the manager of the department that designed and built the original CTrain system. In 2009, the City of Calgary named its largest maintenance facility after Bowen to honour his work. The Oliver Bowen LRT Maintenance Facility (OBMF) in northeast Calgary is a $6.5 million rail facility.

Though the South Line was planned to extend to the northwest, political pressures led to the commission of the "Northeast Line", running from Whitehorn station (at 36 Street NE and 39 Avenue NE) to the downtown core, with a new downtown terminal station for both lines at 10 Street SW, which opened on April 27, 1985.

The Northwest Line, the extension of the South Line to the city's northwest, was opened on September 17, 1987, in time for the 1988 Winter Olympics. This line ran from the downtown core to University station, next to the University of Calgary campus. Since then, all three lines have been extended incrementally, with most of the stations commissioned and built in the 2000s (with the exception of Brentwood which opened in 1990, three years after the original Northwest line opened).

In April 1996, Calgary Transit began piloting a commuter rail service between Anderson station and a temporary station located at 162 Avenue SW, operating a rented Siemens RegioSprinter DMU which ran on CP Rail MacLeod Subdivision tracks. This pilot was intended as a short-term solution to road congestion for the rapidly growing commuter population in South Calgary and as an experiment to test the viability of a South Red Line extension. A new temporary passenger platform was added on the CP Rail line adjacent to Anderson station. The RegioSprinter was travelled between this platform and a platform at 162 Avenue SW located just north of the present-day Somerset–Bridlewood station. This service was only in operation during peak hours and was free-of-charge. Service was discontinued after five months.

The West Line, the extension of the Northeast Line, opened for revenue service on December 10, 2012, as the first new line to open in 25 years. The line runs for 8.2 km from Downtown West–Kerby station on 7 Avenue at 11 Street SW at the west end of Downtown, westward to 69 Street station located at the intersection of 17 Avenue and 69 Street SW.

LRT extensions
Date	Stations	Line
August 31, 1990	Brentwood	Northwest Line
October 9, 2001	Canyon Meadows; Fish Creek–Lacombe	South Line
December 15, 2003	Dalhousie	Northwest Line
June 28, 2004	Shawnessy; Somerset–Bridlewood	South Line
December 17, 2007	McKnight–Westwinds	Northeast Line
June 15, 2009	Crowfoot	Northwest Line
August 27, 2012	Martindale; Saddletowne	Northeast Line
August 25, 2014	Tuscany	Northwest Line

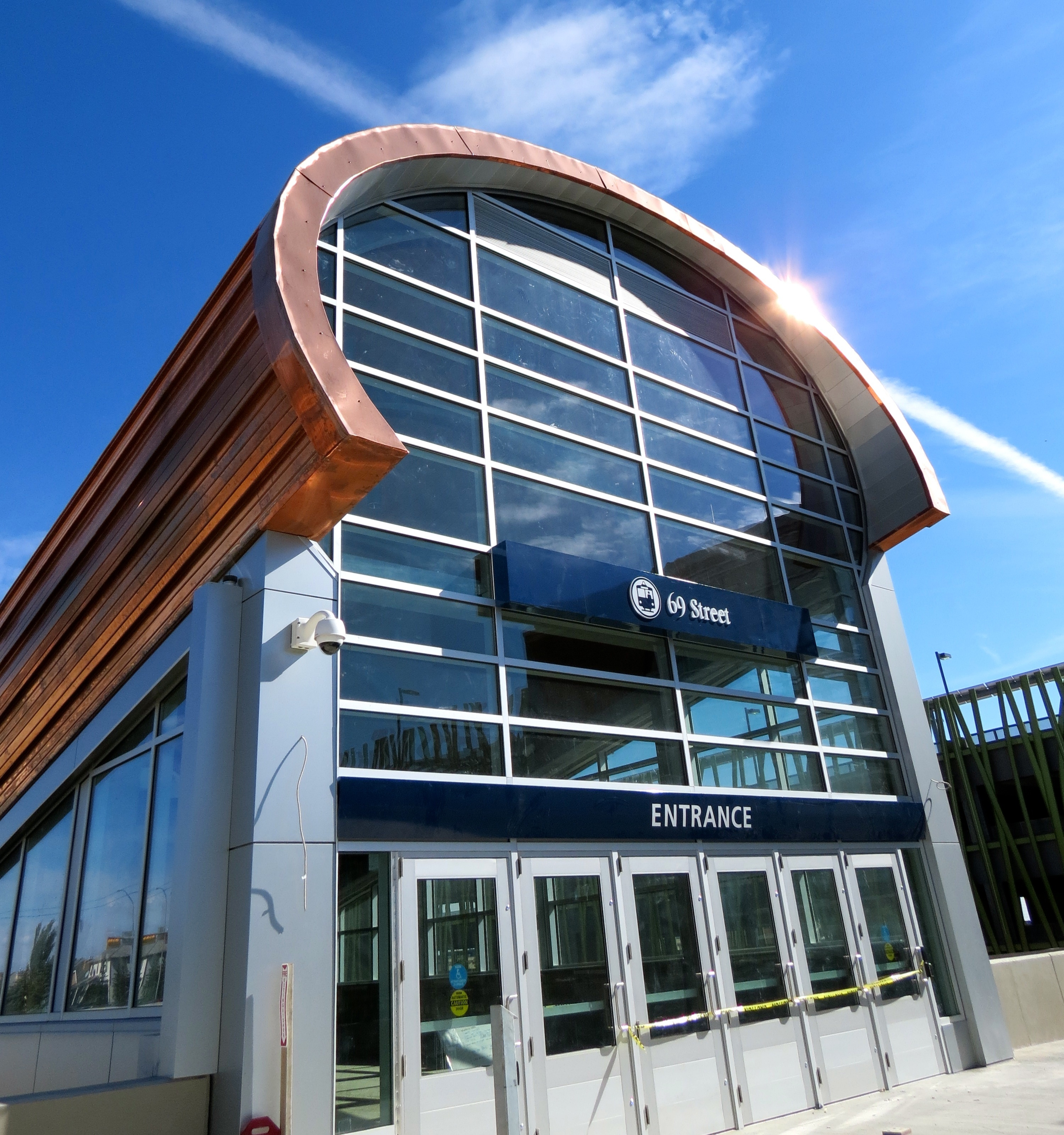
69th Street station entrance.

== Lines ==
The CTrain system has two routes, designated as the Red Line and the Blue Line. They have a combined route length of 59.9 kilometres (37.2 mi). Much of the South leg of the system shares the right of way of the Canadian Pacific Railway and there is a connection from the light rail track to the CPR line via a track switch near Heritage station.

The longer route (Red Line; 35.0 km (21.7 mi) serves the southern and northwestern areas of the city. The shorter route (Blue Line; 25.7 km (16.0 mi) long) serves the northeastern and western sections of the city. Most track is at grade, with its own right-of-way. The downtown portion is a shared right-of-way, serving both routes along the 7th Avenue South transit mall at street level. This portion is a zero-fare zone and serves as a downtown people mover. The tracks split at the east and west ends of downtown into lines leading to the south, northeast, west and northwest residential neighbourhoods of Calgary. Six percent of the system is underground, and seven percent is elevated. Trains are powered by overhead electric wires, using pantographs to draw power.

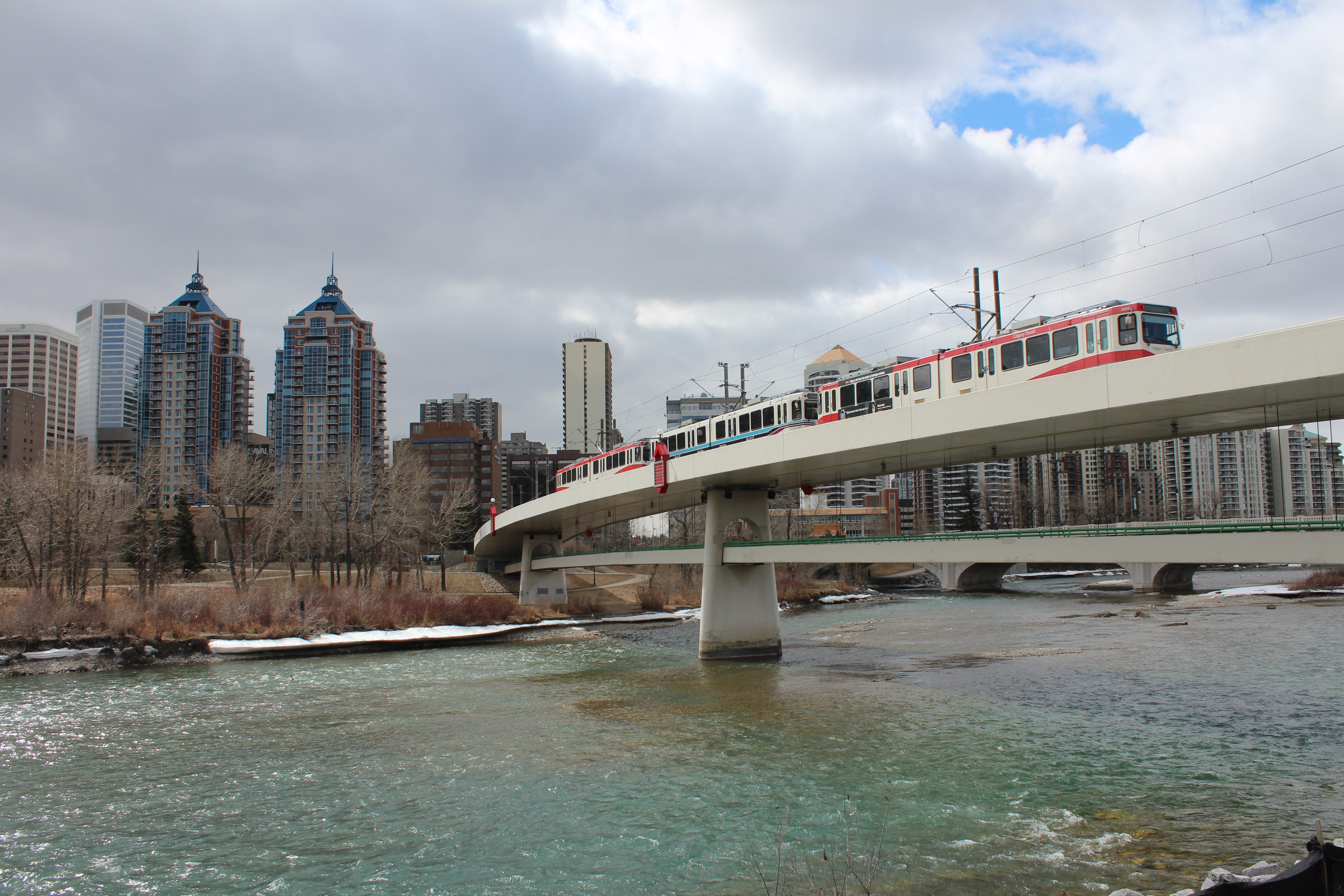
Older Ctrain model crossing the Bow River.

In the first quarter of 2015, the CTrain system had an average of 333,800 unlinked passenger trips per weekday, making it the busiest light rail system in North America. Ridership has declined slightly since reaching this peak, coinciding with a recession in the local economy. In 2007, 45% of the people working in downtown Calgary took transit to work; the city's objective is to increase that to 60%.

== Rolling stock ==
The system initially used Siemens-Duewag U2 DC LRVs (originally designed for German metros), and used by the Frankfurt U-Bahn. The slightly earlier Edmonton LRT, and the slightly later San Diego Trolley were built at approximately the same time and used the same commercial off-the-shelf German LRVs rather than custom-designed vehicles such as were used on the Toronto streetcar system and the Vancouver SkyTrain. U2 vehicles constituted the entire fleet in Calgary until July 2001, when the first Siemens SD-160 cars were delivered. Eighty-three U2 DCs were delivered to Calgary over three separate orders; 27 in 1981, three in 1983, and 53 in 1984 and are numbered 2001–2083. As of March 2020, 32 out of the original 83 U2 DCs remain in service, plus car 2090. The success of the first North American LRT systems inspired Siemens to build an LRV plant in Florin, California. Siemens now supplies one-third of North American LRVs and has supplied over 1000 vehicles to 17 North American systems. This will include 258 vehicles for Calgary when the current order of Siemens S200 vehicles is completed.

Fleet numbers	Total	Type	Year Ordered	Year Retired	Number of units Retired	Exterior	Interior	City of manufacture	Notes
2001–2083, 2090	83	Siemens–Duewag U2	1979–1985	Started 2016	51			Düsseldorf, Germany	1 unit formed from other units (see 2002) Retired units are up to date as of March 24, 2020
2101-2102	2	Siemens–Duewag U2 AC: uses AC traction instead of DC traction.	1988	2016	1	Calgary Transit U2 AC (#2101)	Interior of a Calgary Transit U2 AC (#2101)	Düsseldorf, Germany	Being former demonstration trains: only variants in the world. Named Scout, 2101 is an asset inspection train for overhead lines and tracks.
2201–2272	72	Siemens SD-160 Series 5/6/7	2001–2006	-	-		Interior of a Calgary Transit unrefurbished SD160 (#2212) Interior of a Calgary Transit refurbished SD160 (#2219)	Florin, California	Retrofitted with air conditioning 2009–2011 in-house. All to be refurbished by Siemens.
2301–2338	38	Siemens SD-160NG Series 8	2007	-	1		Interior of a Calgary Transit SD160NG (#2306)	Florin, California	2311 retired due to an accident (see below)
2401-2469	69	Siemens S200	2013–2018	-	-			Florin, California	2401-2463 built and delivered between 2015 and 2019; 2464–2469, 2019–2020
N/A	28	CAF Urbos	2021	-	-	-	-	N/A	First low-floor LRVs in Calgary; planned for use on the Green Line. Option for 24 further LRVs possible.

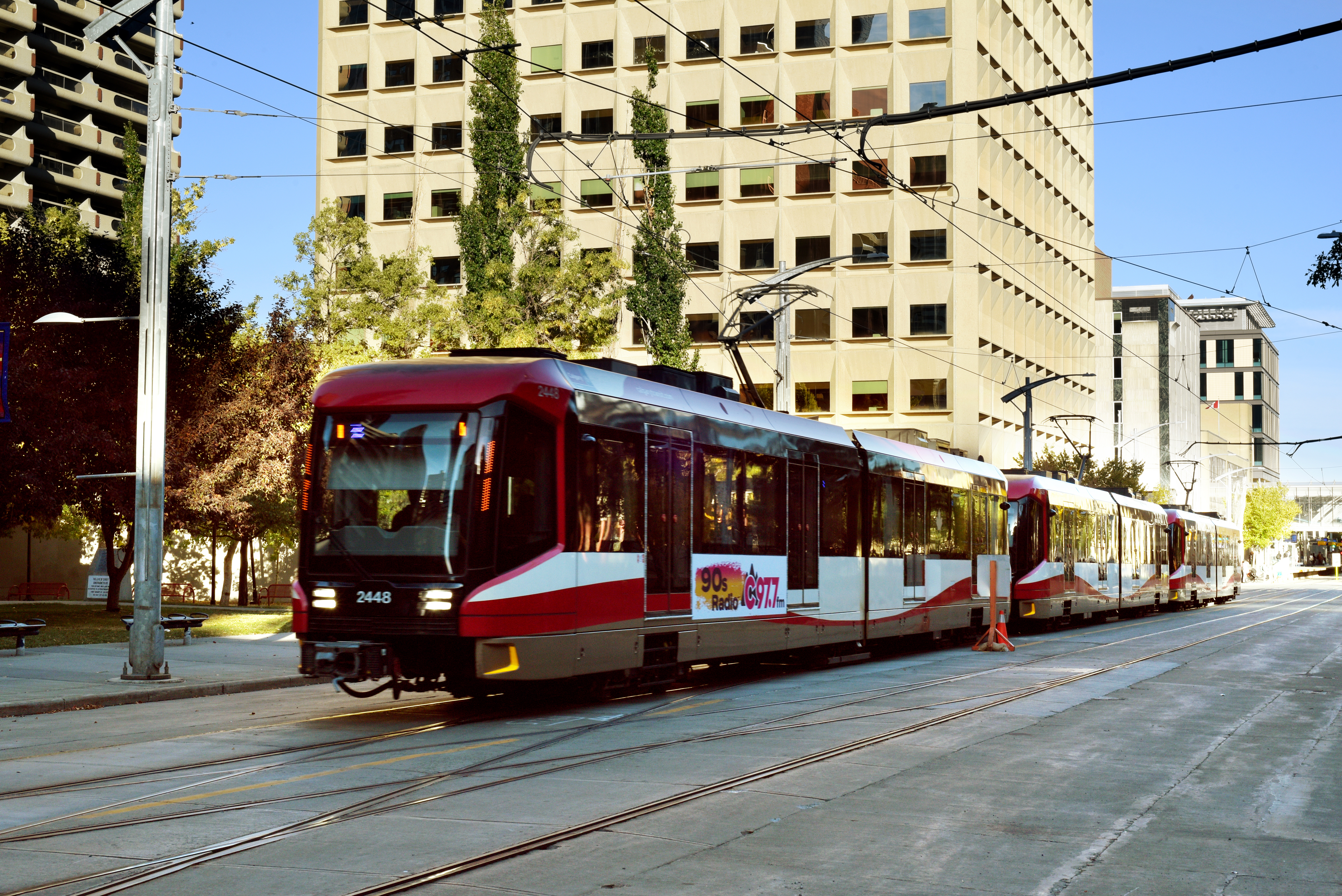
CTrain in the 8-stop tramway-style free-fare zone in Calgary's downtown.

In 1988, the Alberta Government purchased from Siemens two U2 AC units, the first of their kind in North America, for trials on both the Edmonton and Calgary LRT systems. The cars were originally numbered 3001 and 3002 and served in Edmonton from 1988 to spring 1990. These LRVs came to Calgary in the summer of 1990 and in September, Calgary Transit decided to purchase the cars from the province and then applied the CT livery to the cars (they were previously plain white in both Edmonton and Calgary). They retained their original fleet numbers of 3001 and 3002 until 1999, when CT renumbered the cars 2101 and 2102. Initially, these two cars were only run together as a two-car consist as they were incompatible with the U2 DCs. In 2003, Calgary Transit made the two U2 ACs compatible as slave cars between two SD-160s and have been running them like this ever since.

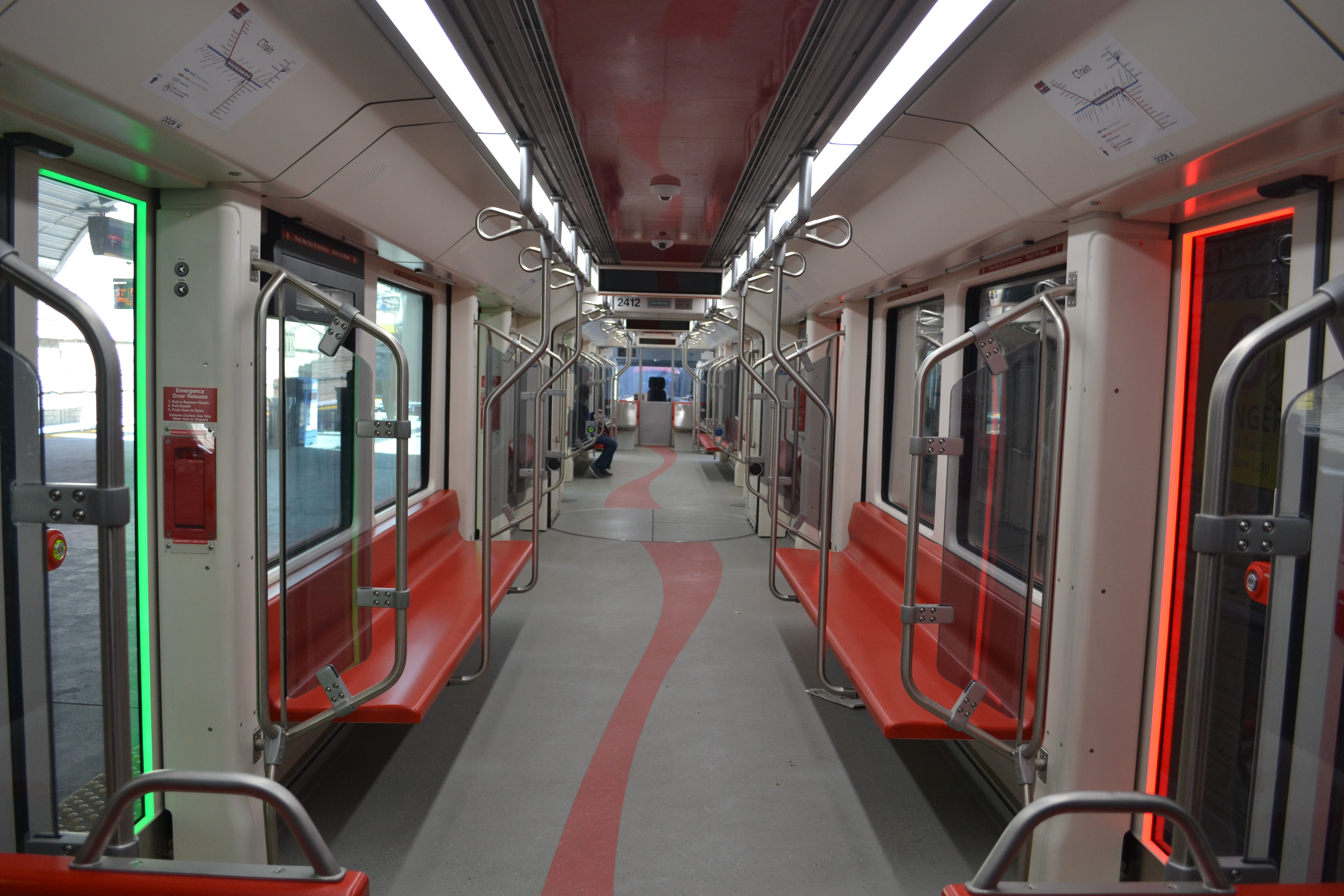
Interior of a Siemens S200 CTrain.

In July 2001, Calgary Transit brought the first of 15 new SD-160 LRVs into service to accommodate the South LRT Extension Phase I and increased capacity. Throughout 2003, another 17 SD-160 LRVs were introduced into the fleet to accommodate the northwest extension to Dalhousie as well as the South LRT Extension Phase II. However, demand for light rail has exploded in recent years. In the decade prior to 2006, the city's population grew by 25% to over 1 million people, while ridership on the CTrain grew at twice that rate, by 50% in only 10 years. This resulted in severe overcrowding on the trains and demands for better service. In December, 2004, city council approved an order for 33 additional SD-160 vehicles from Siemens to not only address overcrowding, but to accommodate the northeast extension to McKnight–Westwinds and the northwest extension to Crowfoot. These new SD–160s started to enter service in November, 2006. In December 2006, CT extended the order by seven cars to a total of 40 cars, which had all been delivered by the spring of 2008. This brought the total of first-generation SD–160s to 72 cars numbered 2201 – 2272. These cars were all delivered without air conditioning, and retrofitted with air conditioning between 2009 and 2011.

In November 2007 city council approved purchasing another 38 SD-160 Series 8 LRVs to be used in conjunction with the West LRT extension (2012) and further expansions to the northeast (Saddletowne 2012) and northwest legs (Tuscany 2014). These are new-generation train cars with many upgraded features over the original SD-160s including factory equipped air conditioning and various cosmetic and technical changes. These units started to enter service in December 2010 and are numbered 2301–2338. As of May 2012, all had entered revenue service.

In September 2013, Calgary Transit ordered 63 S200 LRVs to provide enough cars to run four-car trains, and to retire some of its Siemens-Duewag U2s, which are nearing the end of their useful lifespans. Some of the 80 U2 cars were 34 years old, and all of them had traveled at least 2,000,000 kilometres (1,200,000 mi). The first of the new cars arrived in January, 2016 and delivery was expected take two years. The front of the new cars is customized to resemble a hockey goalie's mask, and they include such new features as heated floors for winter and air conditioning for summer. They also now have high-resolution video cameras covering the entire interior and exterior of the vehicles for security purposes.

On November 18, 2016, Calgary Transit announced the retirement of the first CTrain LRV purchased, car 2001. Some of the Siemens Duewag U2 cars will be phased out as the new Siemens S200 cars come online.

=== Four-car trains ===
In late 2015 Calgary Transit began operating four-car LRT trains on the CTrain system. The lengthening of trains was done to alleviate overcrowding as the system was already carrying more than 300,000 passengers per day, and many trains were overcrowded. The lengthening of trains increased the maximum capacity of each train from 600 to 800 passengers, so when enough new LRT cars arrived to lengthen all trains to four cars, the upgrade increased the LRT system capacity by 33%. Since the platforms on the original stations were designed to only accommodate three-car trains, this required lengthening most of the platforms on the 45 stations on the system and building new electrical substations to power the longer trains. To operate the new four-car trains, the city ordered 63 new cars, although 28 of them were intended to replace the original U2 LRT cars, which have as many as 2.8 million miles on them and are approaching the end of their service lives. Many of the older stations were also worn out by high passenger traffic, and the platforms needed to be rebuilt anyway. Throughout the pandemic, service was reduced to three-car trains. However, as of December 19, 2022, four-car trains are back in service.

== Fares ==
Ctrain ticket purchased from a Ctrain station

Rides taken solely within the downtown are free; the rest of the network operates under a proof of payment system, with random fare inspections. As of 2026, the downtown area is known as the TD Free Fare Zone and encompasses all CTrain stations along 7th Avenue. Fares and passes could be purchased from ticket vending machines at any station. Coins, debit, and credit cards can be used at the machines, however bills cannot. Fares can also be purchased online through the MyFare app or at a Calgary Transit Customer Service Centre. Day passes and monthly passes can also be purchased. Day passes are valid until the end of service on the day of purchase and monthly passes are valid until the end of the month. Currently, the price for a 90 minute fare is 4 dollars. Prices are reduced for seniors and students. Children under 12 years old can ride for free, as well as pets. Special low-income passes and senior annual passes are also available, and eligible post-secondary students enjoy unlimited access to the network through the U-Pass (universal transit pass) program.

== Route details ==
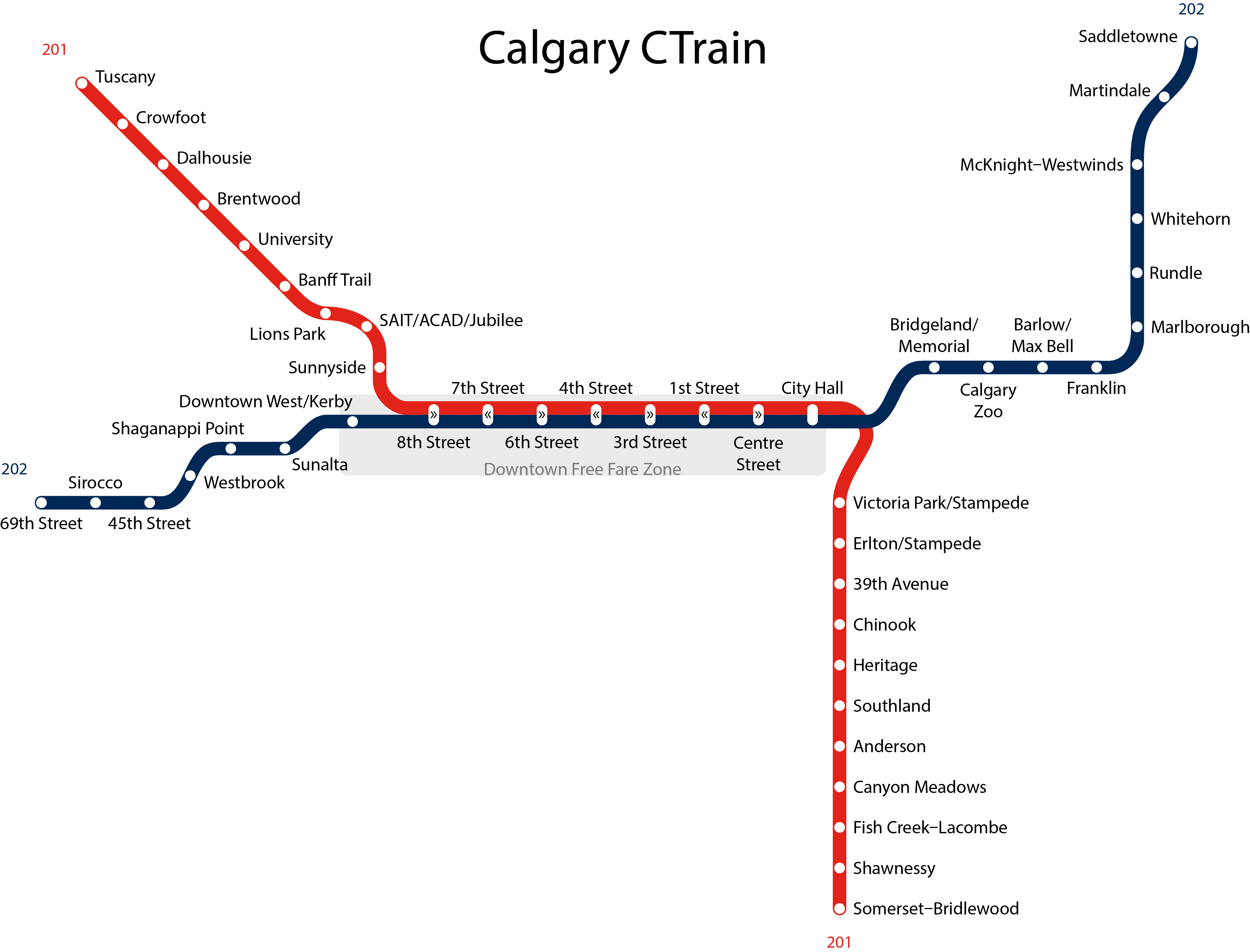
Calgary Light Rail System Map as of 2026

There are two light rail lines in operation: the Red Line running from the far southern to the far northwestern suburbs of Calgary (Somerset/Bridlewood–Tuscany), and the Blue Line running from the northeastern to the western suburbs (Saddletowne–69 Street). The routes merge and share common tracks on the 2 kilometres (1.2 mi) downtown transit mall on 7th Avenue South, which also allows buses and emergency vehicles.

=== Downtown Transit Mall ===
As part of the construction of the original South leg, nine single-platform stations were built along the 7th Avenue South transit mall, which formed the 7th Avenue free fare zone. All nine stations opened May 25, 1981. The tracks run at grade in a semi-exclusive right of way, shared with buses, city and emergency vehicles. This is a free-fare zone intended to act as a downtown people mover. Fares are only required after trains exit the downtown core.

Westbound stations used to consist of Olympic Plaza (formerly 1 Street E, renamed in 1987), 1 Street W, 4 Street W, and 7 Street W. Eastbound stations consisted of 8 Street W, 6 Street W, 3 Street W, Centre Street and City Hall (formerly 2 Street E, renamed in 1987).

When the Northeast leg opened on April 27, 1985, two stations were added: 3 Street E serving Westbound Blue Line trains only and 10 Street W, a centre-loading platform, which served as the terminus of both Red and Blue lines, until the Northwest leg opened in 1987, after which it was the terminus for the Blue line only.

As part of Calgary's refurbishment project, 3 Street E and Olympic Plaza stations have been decommissioned and consolidated into the new gateway City Hall station in 2011. 10 Street W was decommissioned and replaced with the Downtown West–Kerby (formerly called 11 Street W) station in 2012.

==== Downtown station refurbishment ====
In June 2007, the City of Calgary released information on the schedule for the refurbishment of the remaining original downtown stations. The plan involved replacing and relocating most stations, and expanding Centre Street station which was relocated one block east (adjacent to the Telus Convention Centre) in 2000, to board four-car trains. The new stations have retained their existing names (with the exception of 10 Street W becoming Downtown West–Kerby in 2012); however, they may be shifted one block east or west, or to the opposite side of 7th Avenue. The refurbishment project was completed on December 8, 2012, when the Downtown West–Kerby station was opened to the public in conjunction with the West LRT opening event.

- 1 Street SW – new platform relocated one block east opened October 28, 2005.
- 7 Street SW – new platform relocated one block east opened February 27, 2009.
- 6 Street SW – reconstructed in original location. Original platform closed April 7, 2008 and new platform opened March 27, 2009.
- 8 Street SW – new platform relocated one block east opened December 18, 2009.
- 3 Street SW – reconstructed in original location. Original platform closed April 20, 2009 and new platform opened March 12, 2010.
- 3 Street SE – permanently closed May 3, 2010. Replaced by new dual-platform City Hall Station opening July 6, 2011.
- 4 Street SW – reconstructed in original location. Original platform closed January 7, 2010 and new platform opened January 21, 2011.
- City Hall – original Eastbound platform rebuilt with new Westbound platform to replace 3 Street E and Olympic Plaza. Original platform closed May 3, 2010 and new dual-platform station opened July 6, 2011. Olympic Plaza was closed permanently at this time. Eastbound platform re-closed following the 2011 Stampede to finish construction and officially opened September 19, 2011.
- Olympic Plaza – permanently closed July 6, 2011. Replaced by new dual-platform City Hall Station.
- 10 Street SW – permanently closed and removed on September 15, 2012. The new station replacing it, which opened on December 8, 2012, has dual side-loading platforms and is located one block west. This project was initially proposed to be undertaken in 2006, following the opening of the new 1 Street W station. However, the City of Calgary decided to defer the project to coincide with the opening of the West Line and continue on with refurbishment of the other stations. This new station was initially called "11 Street W" up until the Summer of 2012 when it was renamed to Downtown West–Kerby.

This required that the stations be closed during demolition and reconstruction. The new stations feature longer platforms for longer trains, better integration of the platforms into the sidewalk system, better lighting, and more attractive landscaping and street furniture. This project was shortlisted for the New/Old category in the 2012 World Architecture Festival in Singapore.

=== Red Line ===
Also known as Route 201, this route comprises two legs connected by the downtown transit mall: the South leg (17.3 kilometres (10.7 mi)) and the Northwest leg (15.7 kilometres (9.8 mi)). There are eleven stations on the South leg and nine on the Northwest leg. Total length of the line: 33 kilometres (21 mi).

==== South leg ====
This was the first leg of the system to be built. Seven stations on this leg opened on May 25, 1981, as the first light railway line to serve the city. From north to south, they are Victoria Park/Stampede (renamed from Stampede in 1995), Erlton/Stampede (renamed from Erlton in 1995), 39 Avenue (renamed from 42 Avenue in 1986), Chinook, Heritage (also the site of the Haysboro LRT Storage Facility), Southland, and Anderson (also the site of the Anderson LRT Yards). The original South line was 10.9 km long. On October 9, 2001, the line was extended south 3.4 km and two new stations were added: Canyon Meadows and Fish Creek–Lacombe, as part of the South LRT Extension Phase I. On June 28, 2004, Phase II opened adding 3 km of track and two more stations: Shawnessy and Somerset–Bridlewood. A further three stations – Silverado (most likely in the area of 194th Avenue SW), 212th Avenue South, and Pine Creek (in the area around 228th Avenue SW) – are planned once the communities adjacent to their location are developed.

Red Line South Stations
Stations	Community	Opened	Rebuilt			Former names
Victoria Park/Stampede station	Beltline	1981	2023	Outdoor	At-Grade	Stampede station
Erlton/Stampede station	Erlton	1981		Indoor	At-Grade	Erlton station
39 Avenue station	Manchester	1981		Outdoor	At-Grade	42 Avenue station
Chinook station	Manchester	1981	2014	Outdoor	At-Grade	
Heritage station	Haysboro	1981		Indoor	At-Grade	
Southland station	Southwood	1981		Indoor	At-Grade	
Anderson station	Southwood	1981		Indoor	At-Grade	
Canyon Meadows station	Canyon Meadows	2001		Indoor	At-Grade	
Fish Creek–Lacombe station	Shawnee Slopes	2001		Mixed	At-Grade	
Shawnessy station	Shawnessy	2003		Outdoor	At-Grade	
Somerset–Bridlewood station	Somerset	2003		Outdoor	At-Grade	

==== Northwest leg ====
This was the third leg of the system to be built. Five stations on this leg opened on September 7, 1987. From the most central to the most northwesterly, they are Sunnyside, SAIT/AUArts/Jubilee (the station name in full is "Southern Alberta Institute of Technology/Alberta University of the Arts/Jubilee Auditorium"), Lions Park, Banff Trail, and University. The original Northwest leg was 5.6 km long. On August 31, 1990, the line was extended 1 km and Brentwood station was opened as the new terminus. On December 15, 2003, the line was extended 3 km again and Dalhousie station was opened. On June 15, 2009, the line was extended 3.6 km and Crowfoot (formerly Crowfoot-Centennial) was opened. It was extended further by 2.5 km to Tuscany Station on August 25, 2014.

Red Line Northwest Stations
Stations	Community	Opened	Rebuilt			Former names
Sunnyside station	Sunnyside	1987		Outdoor	At-Grade	
SAIT/AUArts/Jubilee station	Hillhurst	1987		Indoor	At-Grade	SAIT/ACAD/Jubilee station
Lions Park station	Hounsfield Heights-Briar Hill	1987		Outdoor	At-Grade	
Banff Trail station	Banff Trail	1987		Outdoor	At-Grade	
University station	Banff Trail	1987		Indoor	At-Grade	
Brentwood station	Brentwood	1990		Indoor	At-Grade	
Dalhousie station	Dalhousie	2003		Indoor	At-Grade	
Crowfoot station	Arbour Lake	2008		Indoor	At-Grade	
Tuscany station	Tuscany	2014		Indoor	At-Grade	Tuscany-Rocky Ridge station

=== Blue Line ===
Also known as Route 202, this route is composed of two legs connected by the downtown transit mall: the Northeast leg (15.5 kilometres (9.6 mi)) and the newer West leg (8.2 kilometres (5.1 mi)). The Northeast leg has ten stations and the West leg has six stations. Total length of this route: 25.7 kilometres (16.0 mi).

==== Northeast leg ====
This was the second leg of the system to be built. Seven stations opened on April 27, 1985, from downtown to the northeast. They are: Bridgeland/Memorial, Zoo, Barlow/Max Bell, Franklin, Marlborough, Rundle, and Whitehorn. The original Northeast line was 9.8 km long. On December 17, 2007, the line was extended 2.8 km further north to an eighth station – McKnight–Westwinds. On August 27, 2012, another 2.9 km extension of track opened and added two more stations – Martindale and Saddletowne. Additional stations are proposed for development, likely beyond 2023, at 96th Avenue, Country Hills Boulevard, 128th Avenue (north of Skyview Ranch) and Stoney Trail (in the Stonegate Landing development), as those areas are developed for future LRT infrastructure.

Blue Line Northeast Stations
Stations	Community	Opened	Rebuilt			Former names
Bridgeland/Memorial station	Bridgeland-Riverside	1985		Indoor	At-Grade	
Calgary Zoo station	Bridgeland-Riverside	1985		Indoor	At-Grade	Zoo station
Barlow/Max Bell station	Mayland Industrial	1985		Indoor	At-Grade	
Franklin station	Albert Park-Radisson Heights	1985		Indoor	At-Grade	
Marlborough station	Marlborough	1985		Indoor	At-Grade	
Rundle station	Rundle	1985		Indoor	At-Grade	
Whitehorn station	Whitehorn	1985	2011	Indoor	At-Grade	
McKnight–Westwinds station	Westwinds	2007		Outdoor	At-Grade	
Martindale station	Martindale	2012		Outdoor	At-Grade	
Saddletowne station	Saddle Ridge	2012		Outdoor	At-Grade	

==== West leg ====
This was the fourth leg of the system to be built, although it was included in the original plans for the system. It was built last because it was anticipated to have lower ridership and higher construction costs than the previous legs. Construction of the 8.2 kilometre (5 mile) leg began in 2009. It opened on December 10, 2012.

The City of Calgary began a review process in late 2006 to update the plans to current standards, and Calgary City Council gave final approval to the project and allocated the required $566-million project funding on November 20, 2007. Funding for the project was sourced from the infrastructure fund that was created when the province of Alberta returned the education tax portion of property taxes to the city. Construction of this leg began in 2009. It was constructed at the same time as further extensions of the NE and NW lines of the LRT system that were approved in November 2007.

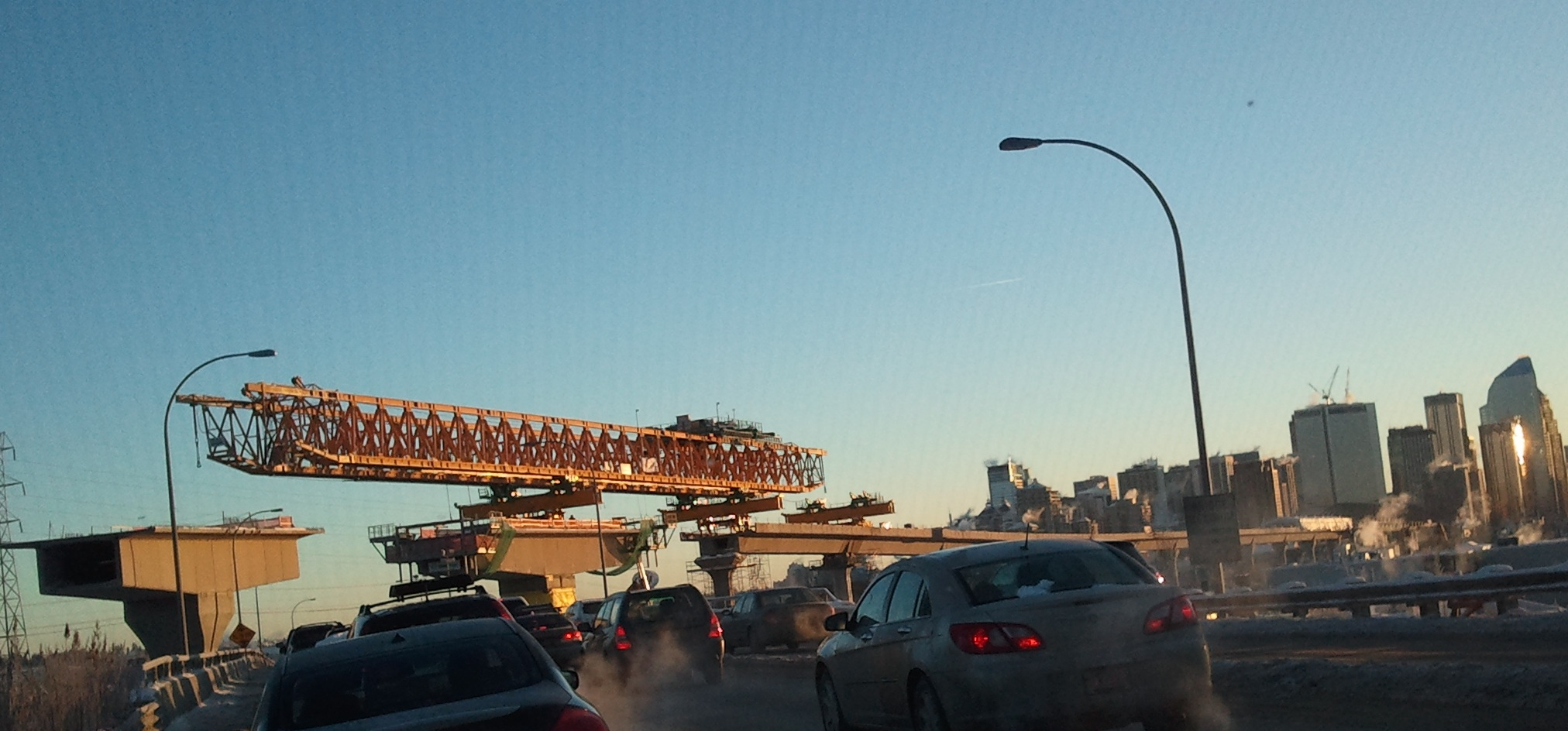
West LRT construction over Bow Trail

The West LRT leg has six stations (from east to west): Sunalta (near 16th Street SW), Shaganappi Point, Westbrook, 45 Street (Westgate), Sirocco, and 69 Street (west of 69th Street near Westside Recreation Centre).

The updated alignment from the 2007 West LRT Report includes the line running on an elevated guideway beginning west of the Downtown West–Kerby Station, running along the CPR right of way to Bow Trail SW, and then to 24th Street SW. The line then runs at grade past Shaganappi Point Station and drops into a tunnel to 33rd Street SW. The tunnel then runs under the Westbrook Mall parking lot, and the former site of the now-demolished Ernest Manning Senior High School. The line then follows the north side of 17th Avenue SW past 37th Street SW below grade to 45 Street station. Past 45th Street the line runs at grade, and approaching Sarcee Trail SW moves onto an elevated guideway that passes over the freeway. The line then runs at grade to Sirocco Station, then proceeds to drop below grade and pass under eastbound 17th Avenue SW at 69th Street SW and return to grade on the south side of the avenue. The line then terminates at 69 Street Station located to the west of 69th Street SW.

Three of the new West leg stations are located at grade. Westbrook, 45 Street, and 69 Street stations are located below grade, while Sunalta is an elevated station. On October 5, 2009, the city council announced approval of a plan to put a portion of the West leg into a trench at 45th Street and 17th Avenue SW, a move welcomed by advocates who fought to have it run underground. The change cost an estimated $61 million; however, lower-than-expected construction costs were expected to absorb much of the change.

The cost for the project is, however, over budget by at least C$35 million and the overall cost could be more than C$1.46 billion because of soaring costs of land used and the integration of public art into the project. The public art aspect of the project was neglected in its initial form. Because City Hall regulations for big construction projects require incorporation of public art, City Hall had to find the money. Therefore, the West LRT project cost C$8.6 million more than expected.

On October 29, 2009, city council announced that the contract to construct the West LRT had been awarded to a consortium led by SNC Lavalin.

Future extension of the West leg to Aspen Woods Station (around 17th Avenue and 85th Street SW) has been planned, and future extensions further west to 101st Street SW may be added as new communities adjacent to 17th Avenue SW are built.

On May 15, 2012, testing of the leg began with two LRT cars. As the construction of the leg moved towards completion, four LRT cars were used, until revenue service began on December 10, 2012.

In its first year of service, 69 Street served an average of 32,400 boardings per day.

Blue Line West Stations
Stations	Community	Opened	Rebuilt			Former names
Downtown West–Kerby station	Downtown West End	1985	2012	Outdoor	At-Grade	10 Street SW station
Sunalta station	Sunalta	2012		Indoor	Elevated	
Shaganappi Point station	Shaganappi	2012		Outdoor	At-Grade	
Westbrook station	Rosscarrock	2012		Indoor	Underground	
45 Street station	Westgate	2012		Outdoor	At-Grade	
Sirocco station	Christie Park	2012		Outdoor	At-Grade	
69 Street station	Aspen Woods	2012		Mixed	Trench	

== Future plans ==
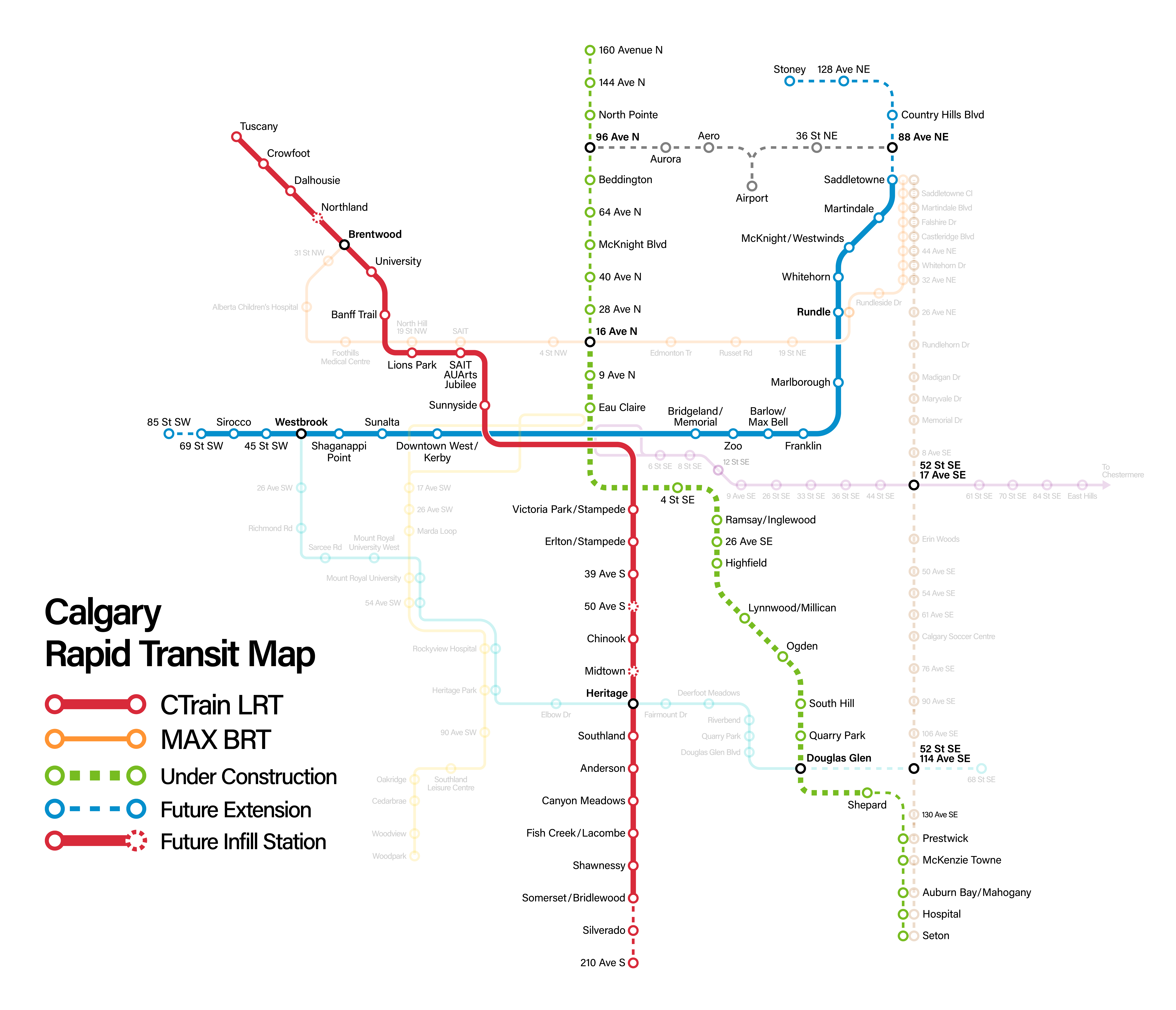
Proposed route extensions and Green Line (North-Central and Southeast LRT)

In 2011, Calgary City Council directed that a long term Calgary Transit Plan be created, taking into account the overall Calgary Transportation Plan. A steering committee and project team, comprising some Council members, City planning staff, independent business people and Calgary Transit staff, after detailed scenario planning and extensive public consultation, produced the December 2012 "RouteAhead: A Strategic Plan for Transit in Calgary". A 30-year roadmap for public transit in Calgary, RouteAhead includes a long-term vision for the CTrain system. The RouteAhead plan was submitted to Council and approved in early 2013.

=== Existing Lines ===
For the Red Line, in its 30-year RouteAhead plan, the South line may be extended another 3.5 km to a possible 210 Avenue SW station.

For the Blue Line, from the same plan, there are more possible extensions to the northeast to either Calgary International Airport (via a spur line), or to 128 Avenue NE, or to have both. There is also a long-term plan in RouteAhead that says the Blue Line will be extended past Stoney Trail.

There are plans to build an additional line to the southeast from the city centre. Calgary Transit has drafted a plan for a transit-only right-of-way, known as the SETWAY (South East Transit Way) for the interim. A second, northern line is to be planned beyond 2023 but the alignment is still pending.

As for a possible underground leg in downtown (under 8 Avenue South), the cost of the project will be at least C$800 million (in 2012 dollars), but its priority has been lowered because there is no funding available for it. However, the overall cost of this and other projects could be at least C$8 billion.

=== Green Line ===
This potential route may cross the downtown core at right angles to the downtown transit mall and connect two new legs: the Southeast leg and the North-Central leg. To avoid capacity constraints on the existing downtown transit mall, it was designed as a separate line, running underground for 4 stations through downtown and the Beltline neighbourhood. It will feature a connection to the Red and Blue lines at 7 Avenue SW station.

The Green Line may stretch from 16th Avenue North through the downtown core into the Southeast to the future Shepard Station at 126th Avenue SE. The $4.6 billion cost of the project will be shared in roughly equal portions between the federal government, the city of Calgary and the provincial government.

==== North leg ====
This leg of the Green Line would serve the residential communities of Country Hills, Coventry Hills, Harvest Hills, Panorama Hills, and other communities, possibly in the future extending as far as the nearby City of Airdrie. The Green Line North, as it has been re-designated, will be a mix of grade level and underground infrastructure extending north from the downtown core along Centre Street North.

In July 2015, the Canadian federal government committed to put $1.5 billion into funding the Green Line LRT or one-third of the project's $4.6 billion cost. Discussions between the city of Calgary and the province continue with the goal of building the new light rail line instead of developing a BRT system as an interim measure.

In January, 2015, Calgary City Council approved the Green Line North (formerly known as North Central LRT), setting Centre Street N as the route. In December 2015, Council approved the planning report on Green Line funding, staging, and delivery. Actual completion dates will depend on delivery of promised federal and provincial government funding.

Currently in the RouteAhead plan, there is also a long-term plan to extend the north leg to Airdrie. It's not exactly certain what route it would take from the current planned terminus.

==== Southeast leg ====
This leg is planned to run from downtown (although on a different routing, not following the 7th Avenue corridor) to the communities of Douglasdale and McKenzie Lake and McKenzie Towne in the southeast, and onwards past Highway 22X into the so-called "Homesteads" region east of Deerfoot Trail.

Eighteen stations have been planned for this route and the project is expected to be completely built by 2039.

Three of the proposed downtown stations are expected to be built underground, and the rest of the line will follow the 52 Street SE corridor from Douglasdale and McKenzie Towne to Auburn Bay (south of Highway 22X) and then wind its way through Health Campus (adjacent to the southeast hospital) and Seton. Unlike Routes 201 and 202, which use high-floor U2 and SD-160 LRVs, the eastern route will use low-floor LRVs, specifically CAF Urbos vehicles, of which 28 were ordered in November 2021 for the line.

From north to south, the proposed stations are: Eau Claire, Central (at 6 Avenue), Macleod Trail, 4 Street SE, Ramsay/Inglewood, Crossroads, Highfield, Lynnwood, Ogden, South Hill, Quarry Park, Douglasglen, Shepard, Prestwick, McKenzie Towne, Auburn Bay/Mahogany (at 52nd Street), Health Campus/Seton (the station likely will share the name of the hospital and expected to be completed by 2039), with further stations to the south expected in the future.

Construction of the South East LRT would cost over C$2.7 billion over 27 years. Because there was no funding available, the city laid out plans to build a transit way for the South East BRT known as SETWAY. Open houses to explore the idea of a transit way for the South East occurred in the South East communities of Ramsay, Riverbend and McKenzie Towne in January 2012. Between 1999 and 2006 Calgary Transit conducted studies for the South East LRT to find ways to make improvements of overall transit use in the South East for short term while having LRT being the long-term goal.

On December 3, 2016, it was announced that an additional C$250 million in additional funding was allocated in a joint venture by the Federal and Provincial Governments. This comes in line with a possible final cost estimate of the South East LRT to be announced in March 2017.

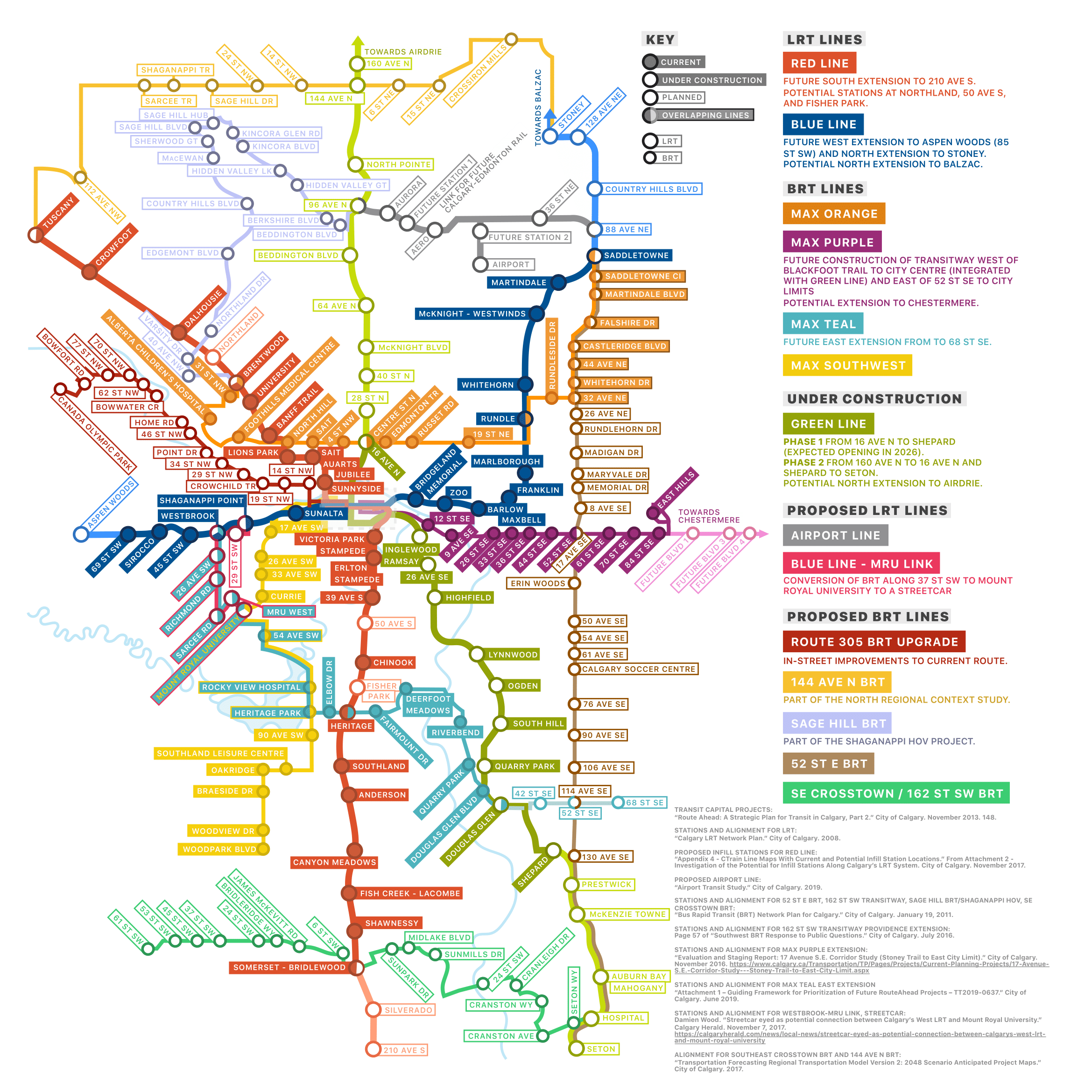
Capital transit projects for the future Calgary rapid transit network. Map based on LRT Network Plan (2008), BRT Network Plan (2011), Route Ahead Plan (2013), and other City documents.

=== Spur line to Calgary International Airport ===
Calgary Transit's C$8 billion, 30-year RouteAhead plan, approved in 2013, includes a connection from downtown Calgary to Calgary International Airport, which may take initial form as a Route 202 spur line. The Airport Trail road tunnel, which opened on May 25, 2014, was built with room to accommodate a future two-track CTrain right-of-way.

=== Future MAX (BRT) light rail/streetcar conversion ===
RouteAhead currently suggests a long-term light rail (LRT) conversion of the MAX Purple BRT route, and the addition of a light rail (LRT) or streetcar line running parallel to the MAX Teal BRT between Westbrook and Mount Royal University Stations.

=== Other future improvements ===
In late 2015, Calgary Transit completed upgrading its entire system to operate four-car trains instead of the original three-car trains. When enough new LRVs are delivered to lengthen all trains to four cars, this will increase the rush-hour capacity of the system by 33%. By 2023, Calgary Transit also plans to begin decommissioning some of the original Siemens-Duewag U2s (as of 2010 80 of the original 83 were in use, and nearing 29 years of service, by 2023 they will be 42 years old). Calgary Transit has ordered some 60 new Siemens S200 LRV cars to replace 28 of the existing U2s in addition to lengthening many of the trains to four cars. Calgary transit has also integrated a new mobile ticketing system which allows riders to buy CTrain and other Calgary Transit tickets and passes anytime from anywhere with the use of a smartphone. This system, dubbed "My Fare" was rolled out at the end of July 2020, but faced issues at launch such as the incompatibility with Apple's iOS devices.

=== Further underground infrastructure ===
In addition to numerous tunnels to allow trains to pass under roadways, geographic features, and mainline railways, there are other notable underground portions of Calgary's CTrain system.

Part of the system through downtown is planned to be transferred underground when needed to maintain reliable service. Given this, portions of the needed infrastructure have been built as adjacent and associated land was developed. As a result of this original plan, when the City of Calgary built a new Municipal Building, it built a short section of tunnel to connect the existing CPR tunnel to the future tunnel under 8th Avenue S. The turnoff to this station is visible in the tunnel on the Red Line entering downtown from the south, shortly before City Hall. However, after urban explorers discovered the tunnel and visited it during a transit strike, the city walled off the spur tunnel with concrete blocks.

As the population of metropolitan Calgary increases and growing suburbs require new lines and extensions, the higher train volumes will exceed the ability of the downtown section along 7th Avenue S to accommodate them. To provide for long-term expansion, the city is reviewing its plans to put parts of the downtown section underground. The current plans allow the expanded Blue Line (Northeast/West) to use the existing 7th Avenue S surface infrastructure. The expanded Red Line (Northwest/South), now sharing 7th Avenue S with the Blue Line, will be relocated to a new tunnel dug beneath 8th Avenue S. The future Southeast/Downtown route will probably enter downtown through a shorter tunnel under one or more streets (candidates include 2nd Street W, 5th Street W, 6th Street W, 8th Avenue S, 10th Avenue S, 11th Avenue S, and 12th Avenue S). Although Calgary City Council commissioned a functional study for the downtown metro component of the CTrain system in November 2007, the city is unlikely to complete this expansion before 2017 unless additional funding is received from provincial or federal governments. The cost of bringing the potential underground leg under 8 Avenue South could be at least C$800 million, according to Calgary Transit's 30-year RouteAhead plan.

== Stations ==
There are 45 stations in the CTrain system on 2 distinct lines. The typical station outside the downtown core allows for several passenger arrival and departure methods. Many CTrain passengers travel to and from suburban stations on feeder bus routes that wind their way through surrounding neighbourhoods. Another popular option is a park and ride lot, in which commuters drive or bike to a station by car or bicycle and then transfer to a CTrain to complete their journey. Alternatively, some CTrain passengers disembark at drop-off zones from vehicles travelling elsewhere; because commuters at the time of the system's opening were sometimes conveyed by their spouses, these zones were once branded as Kiss and Ride areas.

== Ridership ==
The CTrain's high ridership rate and cost effectiveness can be attributed to a number of factors. The nature of Calgary itself has encouraged CTrain use. Calgary has grown into the second largest head office city in Canada, with a very dense downtown business district. Most of the head offices are crowded into about 1 square kilometre (250 acres) of land in the downtown core. In the last half century the population of Calgary has grown dramatically, outpacing the ability of roads to transport people into the city centre, while the central business district has grown up vertically rather than spread out into the suburbs.

Historically, Calgary residents, particularly its influential inner city community associations, voted against proposals to build major freeways into its city centre, forcing new commuters to use transit as their numbers increased while downtown street and freeway capacity remained the same. City planners limited the number of parking spaces in the downtown core since the narrow downtown streets could not allow more traffic to park. At the same time, Calgary's maturation as a globally influential head office city caused many surface parking lots to be replaced by new skyscrapers, which increased office workers while reducing parking spaces. This eventually made it prohibitively expensive for most people to park downtown. The shortage of downtown parking caused fees to become among the most expensive in North America. As a result, in 2012 50% of Calgary's 120,000 downtown workers used Calgary Transit to get to work, with a long-term goal of growing that proportion to 60% of downtown workers.

Forward planning for the CTrain played an important role. Although the light rail system was not chosen until 1976, the city planners had proactively reserved transit corridors for some form of high capacity transport during the 1960s, and the right-of-ways for the system were reserved when Calgary's population was less than 500,000, whereas today it is well over twice that number. Bus rapid transit lines were put in place along future routes to increase commuter numbers prior to constructing proposed future LRT lines. Rather than demolishing buildings, the city reached an agreement with CP Rail to build most of the south line in available space inside an existing CPR right-of-way. Large parts of the other lines were built in the medians and along the edges of freeways and other major roads. Automobile driver objections were muted by adding extra lanes to roads for cars at the same time as putting in the LRT tracks, which reduced costs for both, and by adding grade-separating intersections which reduced both driver and train delays. The lines and stations were placed to serve large outlying suburbs and the central and other business districts, and to serve existing and predicted travel patterns.

Costs were controlled during construction and operation of the system by going with the lowest bidder and using relatively cheap, commercially available technology without regard for "buy Canadian" policies. This has worked out well for a pioneer system because the German technology chosen has since become a more or less standard design for most North American LRT systems, and compatible new-generation equipment with new features is available off-the-shelf. A grade-separated system was passed over in preference for a system with few elevated or buried segments, and the trains and stations selected were of the tried and tested, utilitarian variety (for example, vehicles were not air conditioned, storage yards were not automated, and stations were usually modest concrete platforms with a shelter overhead). This allowed greater amounts of track to be laid within available budgets. The CTrain reduced fare collection costs by using an honour system of payment. Transit police check passenger tickets at random, and fines are set at a level high enough that those who are caught pay the costs for those who evade detection. Staffing costs were kept low by employing a minimum number of workers, and because the system is all-electric (wind powered) it can run all night with only 1 driver per train and 2 people in the control room. It now runs 22 hours per day without significantly increased overhead. (The other 2 hours are reserved for track maintenance).

Although not universally grade separated, the CTrain is able to operate at high speeds on much of its track because it is separated from traffic and pedestrians by fences and concrete bollards. The downtown 7th Avenue transit way is limited to trains, buses, and emergency vehicles, with private cars prohibited. Trains are given priority right of way at most road crossings outside of downtown. As a result, trains are able to operate at 80 km/h (50 mph) outside of downtown, and 40 km/h (25 mph) along the 7th Avenue corridor. 7th Avenue is a free fare zone, intended as a downtown people-mover to encourage use for short hops through the downtown core. The city manages to achieve very high transit capacity on the 7th Avenue transit corridor by staging the traffic lights, so that all the trains move forward in unison to the next station on the synchronized green lights, and load and unload passengers on the intervening red lights. The trains are now 1 block long, but buses occupy the empty gaps every second block between trains and the buses unload and load passengers while the trains pass them.

In 2001, the U.S. General Accounting Office released a study of the cost-effectiveness of American light rail systems. Although not included in the report, Calgary had a capital cost of US$24.5 million per mile (year 2000 dollars), which would be the sixth lowest (Edmonton was given as US$41.7 million per mile). Because of its high ridership (then 188,000 boardings per weekday, now over 300,000) the capital cost per passenger was $2,400 per daily passenger, by far the lowest of the 14 systems compared, while the closest American system was Sacramento at $9,100 per weekday passenger). Operating costs are also low, in 2005, the CTrain cost $163 per operating hour to operate. With an average of 600 boardings per hour, in 2001 cost per LRT passenger was $0.27, compared to $1.50 for bus passengers in Calgary.

== Facilities ==
- Anderson Garage – LRV indoor storage and training facilities
- Haysboro Garage – small indoor and outdoor LRV storage; LRV yard and Turner Storage Area
- Oliver Bowen Maintenance Centre – major LRV repair and shops; storage for 60 cars (and up to 108 cars after expansion)

== See also ==
- Calgary municipal railway
- Light rail in Canada
- Light rail in North America
- List of tram and light-rail transit systems
