= Patterson, Calgary =

Patterson Heights
- Neighbourhood
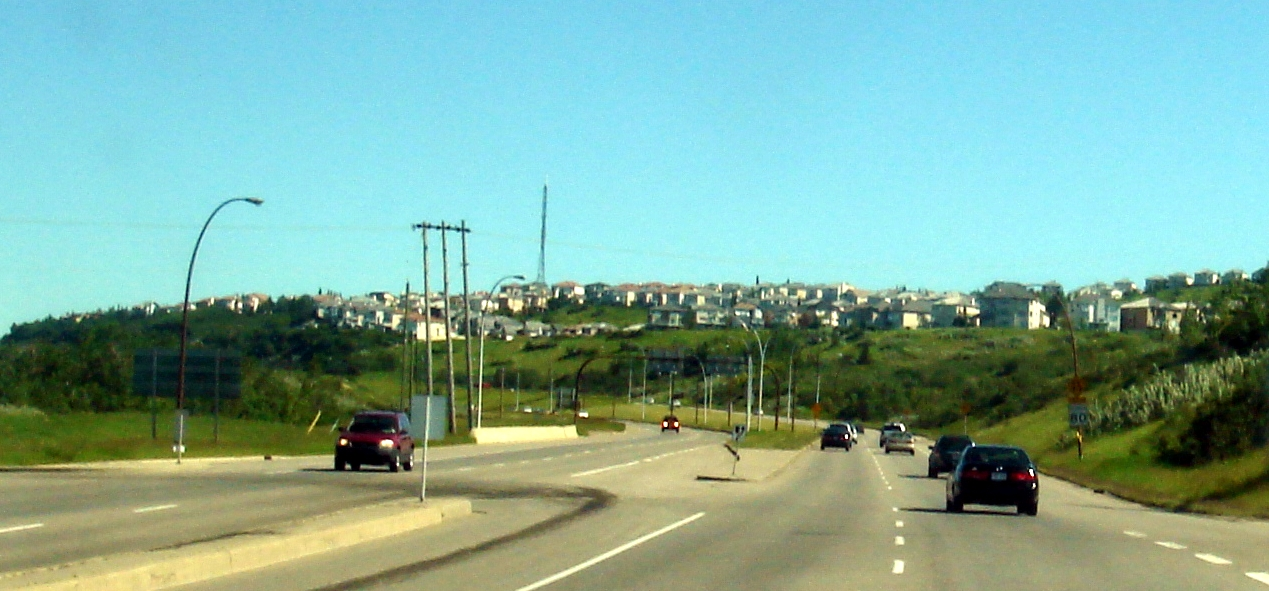
- Olympic Village in Patterson overlooking Sarcee Trail

- Location of Patterson in Calgary
- Coordinates: 51°03′48″N 114°10′28″W
- Country: Canada
- Province: Alberta
- City: Calgary
- Quadrant: SW
- Ward: 6
- Established: 1983
- Annexed: 1956

Government
  - Mayor: Jeromy Farkas
  - Administrative body: Calgary City Council
  - Councillor: John Pantazopoulos (Independent)
- Elevation: 1,205 m (3,953 ft)

Population (2006)
  - Total: 4,141
  - Average Income: $78,786
- Postal code: T3H
- Website: Patterson Community Association
- Coach Hill Patterson Heights Community Association www.chph.ca. And on Facebook CHPHcommunity.com

Patterson Heights is a residential neighbourhood in the southwest quadrant of Calgary, Alberta in Canada. It is bounded by Sarcee Trail to the east and north, Bow Trail to the south, 69 Street to the west and Old Banff Coach Road to the south. Edworthy Park, developed in the Bow River valley, borders the community to the north and east across Sarcee Trail.

It is represented in the Calgary City Council by the Ward 6 councillor.

== History ==
Before annexation, the area consisted of mostly acreages. It was named after the Patterson family, who owned much of the land. Prior to that, it was known as Broadcast Hill, for the 250 m (820 ft) CFCN re-transmission tower located here.

Originally, the University of Alberta was to be located on the site of the present day community; however, Edmonton was ultimately chosen as the site of the campus.

The lands were annexed to the city of Calgary in 1956 and Patterson Heights was established as a neighbourhood in 1983. During the planning phase, in the early 1980s, Patterson Heights was referred to as Strathcona Cell "A".

During the XV Olympic Winter Games in 1988, the Broadcast Hill Media Village was located in Patterson Heights. The apartments have since been converted into condominiums.

== Demographics ==
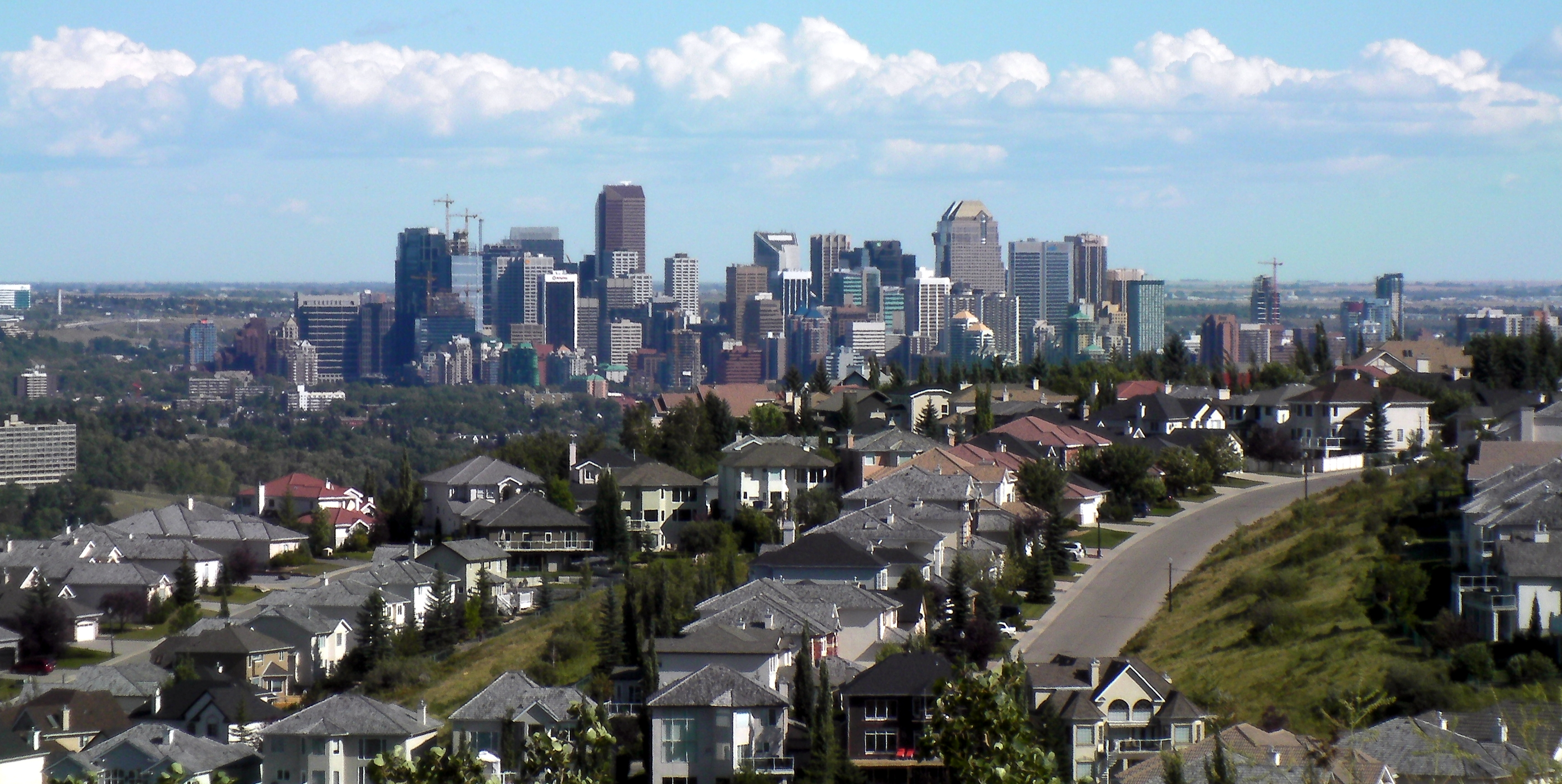
Patterson with Downtown Calgary in background

In the City of Calgary's 2012 municipal census, Patterson had a population of 4,281 living in 2,008 dwellings, a 2.9% increase from its 2011 population of 4,162. With a land area of 2 km^{2} (0.77 sq mi), it had a population density of 2,100/km^{2} (5,500/sq mi) in 2012.

Residents in this community had a median household income of $78,786 in 2000, and there were 8.9% low income residents living in the neighbourhood. As of 2000, 23.8% of the residents were immigrants. A proportion of 28.8% of the buildings were condominiums or apartments, and 23% of the housing was used for renting.

== See also ==
- List of neighbourhoods in Calgary
