= 45 Street station (Calgary) =

Light rail station in Calgary, Alberta, Canada

45 Street
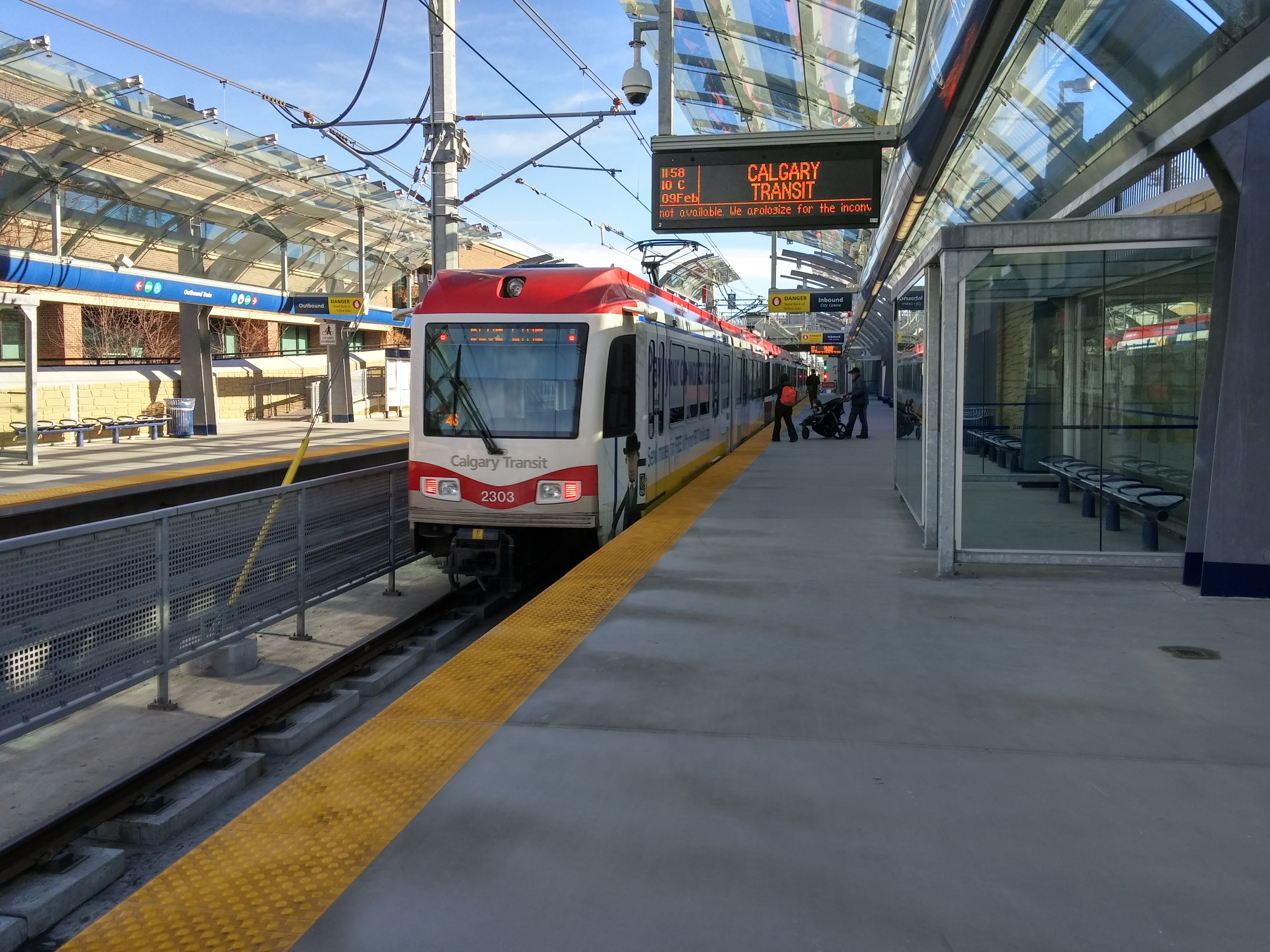

General information
- Other names: Glenside; Glendale-Westgate; 45 Street SW
- Coordinates: 51°02′16.62″N 114°09′11.94″W
- Owner: Calgary Transit
- Platforms: Side-loading platforms
- Connections: 2 Killarney-17th Avenue/Mount Pleasant; 93 Westbrook/Coach Hill

Construction
- Structure type: Trench
- Parking: None
- Accessible: yes

History
- Opened: 2012; 14 years ago

Services
Preceding station	Calgary Transit	Following station
Sirocco toward 69 Street	Blue Line	Westbrook toward Saddletowne
Location

45 Street station is a CTrain light rail station in Calgary, Alberta, Canada. It is the fourth station from downtown on the West leg of the Blue Line. It opened for revenue service on December 10, 2012. On December 8, 2012, a preview of the West Line was provided. The station is located along the community borders of Glendale and Westgate.

The station is located in a trench on the north side of 17 Avenue SW and west of 45 Street SW, 5.3 km West of the 7 Avenue & 9 Street SW Interlocking. No park & ride is provided and the station is a walk-on only with passengers arriving by Calgary Transit buses, cycling, walking or by vehicle drop off. The platforms are side-loading with grade-level access at the west end and stairs and ramps at the east end. The station serves the neighborhoods of Glendale, Rosscarrock, Westgate and Glenbrook. It is located immediately adjacent to the Calgary main office of the Alberta Motor Association, as well as a district Calgary Police Service station.

45 Street along with 69 Street are the first trenched stations to be built in Calgary.

In its first year of service, 45 Street served an average of 3,630 boardings per day.

== Station name ==
The name of the station has been criticized by transit advocates for not properly reflecting the area around the station. It has been argued that the station should be renamed to include the communities of Glendale and/or Westgate. It has been noted that streets north of the station start with "W" and streets south of the station start with "G", and that the station would serve more as a landmark for pedestrians if the station was renamed.

== History ==
Prior to the station's existence, the Glenside Bus Terminal existed in the station's place; which served as the terminus of bus route 2.

The station was opened on December 10, 2012 as a part of the West Blue Line extension, which saw the Blue Line extended from Downtown to 69 Street Station.

In 2024, the Jill Anholt sculpture TransitStory, made up of thirty silhouettes of travellers, was placed at the west entrance to the station. It had previously been located on the downtown line at 7th Avenue and Centre Street South.

== Buses ==
The following routes have a connection at 45 Street station:

- 2 - Killarney-17 Ave/Mount Pleasant
- 94 - Signal Hill/Strathcona

== Media appearances ==
=== Calgary Transit Media ===
This station is notable for being featured as the station on the home-page of Calgary Transit fare payment machines across the whole system.

== See also ==
- CTrain
- Blue Line (Calgary)
- Westbrook station (Calgary)
- 69 Street station (Calgary)
- Glendale, Calgary
- Westgate, Calgary
