= 69 Street station (Calgary) =

Light rail station in Calgary, Alberta, Canada

69 Street
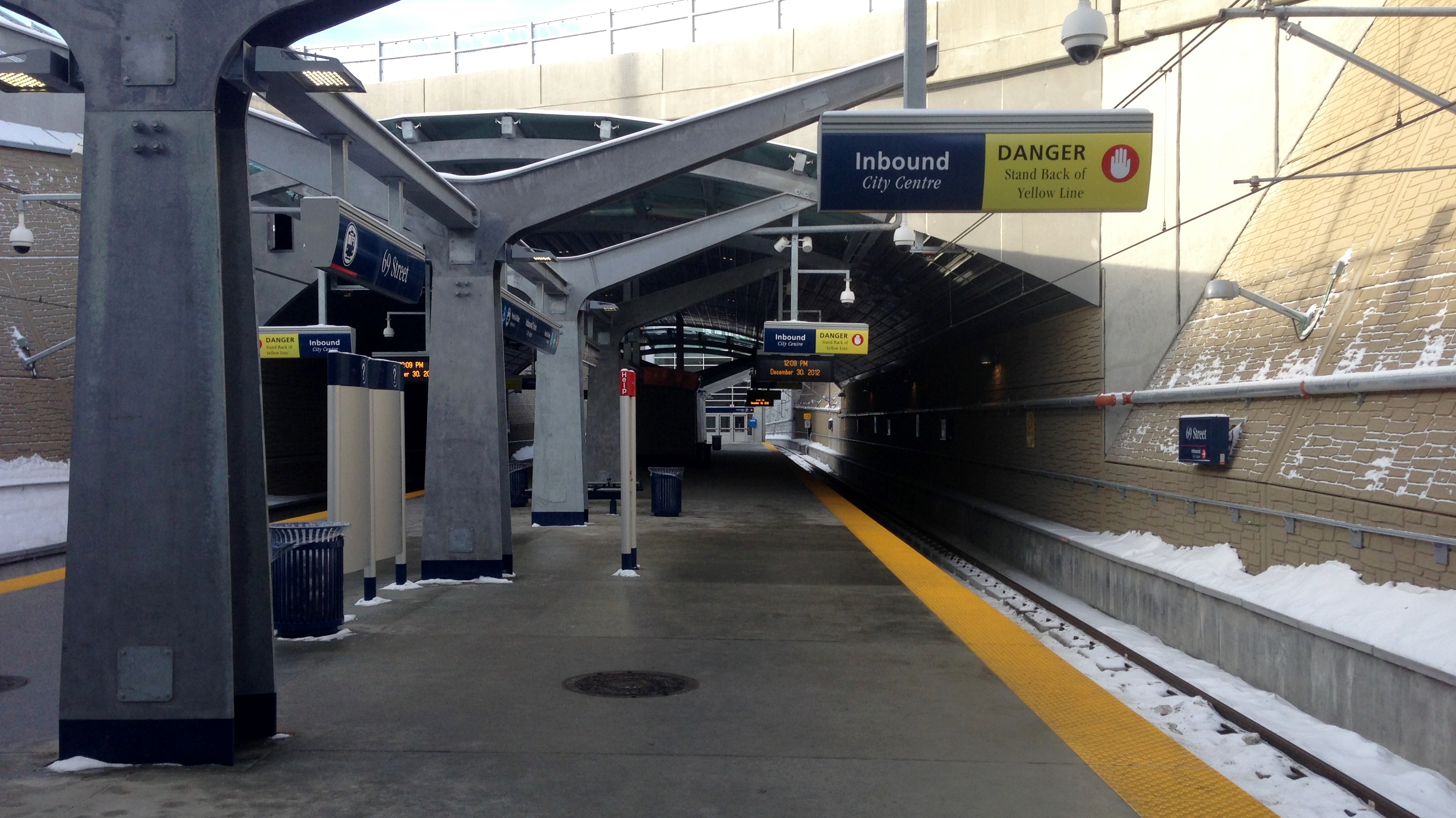

General information
- Coordinates: 51°02′15.42″N 114°11′13.32″W
- Owner: Calgary Transit
- Platforms: Centre-loading platform
- Connections: 51 Discovery Ridge/West Springs; 93 Westbrook/Coach Hill; 94 Strathcona/Signal Hill; 98 Cougar Ridge; 156 Aspen Woods; 164 Aspen Summit

Construction
- Structure type: Trench
- Parking: 93 spaces on surface lot, 750 spaces in parkade
- Accessible: yes

History
- Opened: 2012; 14 years ago

Services
Preceding station	Calgary Transit	Following station
Terminus	Blue Line	Sirocco toward Saddletowne
Location

69 Street station is a CTrain light rail station in Calgary, Alberta, Canada. It is the sixth and terminal station on the West LRT line. The station was opened for the public on December 8, 2012, as part of a preview of the new West Line with an opening ceremony for the line. Revenue service started on December 10, 2012.

The trenched station is located at the intersection of 69 Street SW and 17 Avenue SW, 8.2 km West of the 7 Avenue & 9 Street SW Interlocking. Ambrose University and the new Ernest Manning High School, which replaced the old one at 17 Avenue & 33 Street SW, due to the construction of the Westbrook station, are located adjacent to the 69 St. SW station. Another major school, Rundle College, is located a block away. The station is also near the Westside Recreation Centre.

69 Street along with 45 Street are the first trenched stations to be built in Calgary.

The centre-loading platform is accessed at both the east and west ends through station heads providing access to the platform via escalator, stairs, and an elevator.

The station includes a large Park & Ride lot that can accommodate 840 vehicles and it includes a multi-level parkade.

The West Line is planned to be extended further west, past 69 Street SW, to Aspen Woods and Springbank Hill, once the population of those areas is sufficient for LRT. The extension is not expected to happen until after 2023, so 69 Street SW will be the terminus station until at least then.

In its first year of service, 69 Street served an average of 10,590 boardings per day.

== Around the station ==
=== Major destinations ===
- Ambrose University
- Ernest Manning Athletic Park
- Ernest Manning High School
- Rundle College Jr/Sr High School
- Westside Recreation Centre

=== Communities ===
- Aspen Woods
- Christie Park
- Signal Hill
- Springbank Hill
- Stubersus

=== Major streets ===
- 17 Avenue SW
- 69 Street SW
- Springborough Blvd

== Buses ==
The following bus routes originate from 69 Street station:

- 51 – Discovery Ridge/West Springs
- 93 – Westbrook/Coach Hill
- 94 – Strathcona/Signal Hill
- 98 – Cougar Ridge
- 156 – Aspen Woods
- 164 – Aspen Summit/Springbank Hill
