= Sirocco station =

Light rail station in Calgary, Alberta, Canada

Sirocco
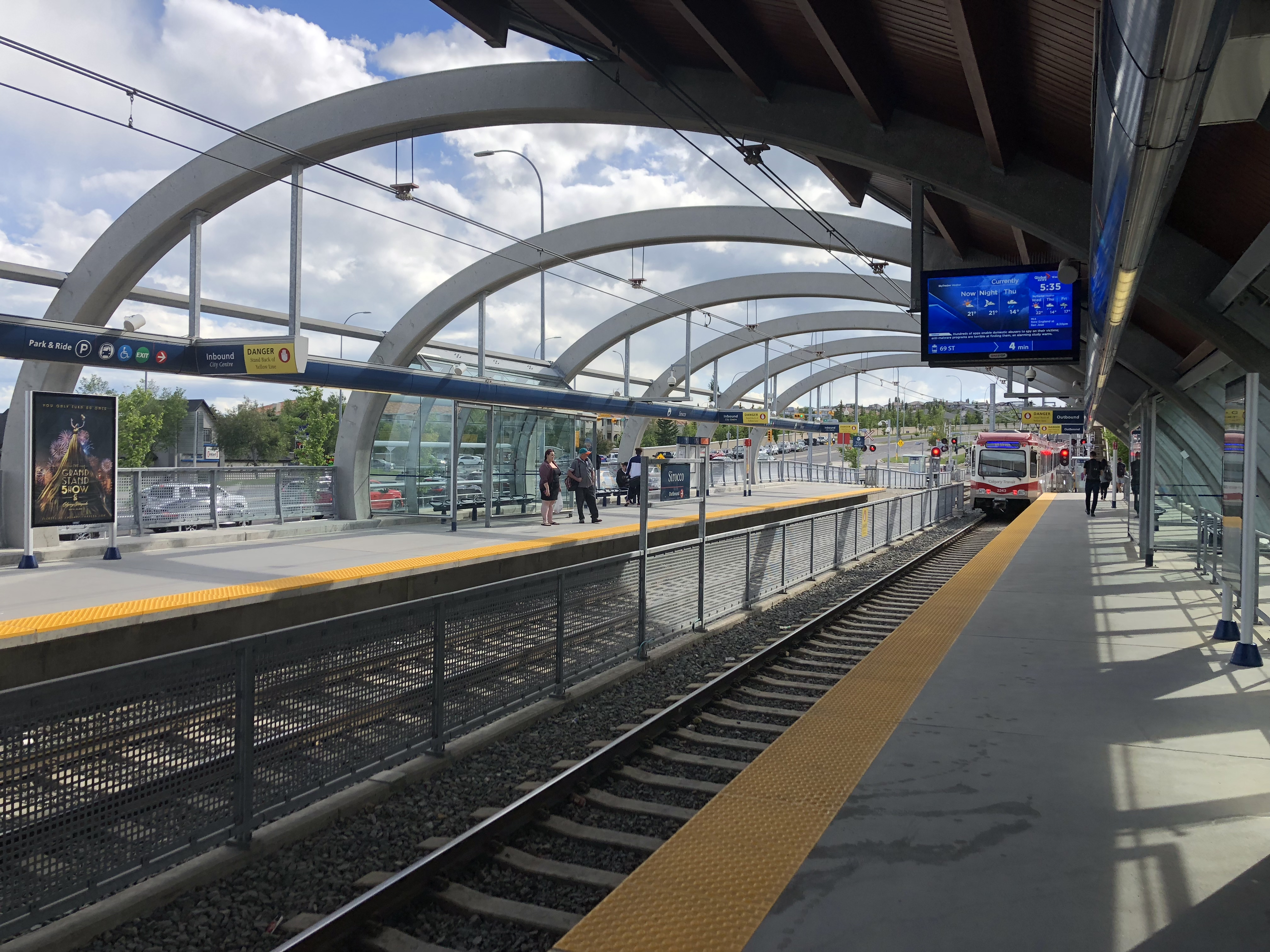

General information
- Coordinates: 51°02′17.64″N 114°10′10.02″W
- Owner: Calgary Transit
- Platforms: Side-loading platforms
- Tracks: 2
- Connections: 94 Strathcona/Signall Hill

Construction
- Structure type: At-grade
- Accessible: yes

History
- Opened: 2012; 14 years ago

Services
Preceding station	Calgary Transit	Following station
69 Street Terminus	Blue Line	45 Street toward Saddletowne
Location

Sirocco is a light rail station on the Blue Line of the CTrain network in Calgary, Alberta, Canada. It is located along the north side of 17th Ave SW, between 69 Street and 45 Street stations, and was opened on December 10, 2012, as part of the West LRT extension from Sunalta to 69 Street.

== Location and station layout ==
The station is located along the north side of 17th Ave SW, just east of Costello Blvd, with westbound trains arriving from the north and eastbound trains arriving from the south.

The station includes a large park and ride just east of West Market Square, which can accommodate upwards of 450 vehicles.

== History ==
The station was built as a part of the West LRT extension of the Blue Line, which also included Sunalta, Shaganappi Point, Westbrook, 45 Street, and 69 Street. The station, along with the rest of the West LRT, opened for a preview service on December 8, 2012, and opened for revenue service on December 10, 2012.

In its first year of service, Sirocco served an average of 3,040 boardings per day.

== Buses ==
The following bus routes originate at Sirocco station:

- 94 - Strathcona / 94 - Signal Hill
