= Westgate, Calgary =

Westgate
- Neighbourhood

- Location of Westgate in Calgary
- Coordinates: 51°02′41″N 114°09′33″W
- Country: Canada
- Province: Alberta
- City: Calgary
- Quadrant: SW
- Ward: 6
- Established: 1957
- Annexed: 1956

Government
  - Mayor: Jeromy Farkas
  - Administrative body: Calgary City Council
  - Councillor: John Pantazopoulos (Independent)

Area
  - Total: 0.5 km^{2} (0.19 sq mi)
- Elevation: 1,140 m (3,740 ft)

Population (2006)
  - Total: 3,145
  - Average Income: $54,309
- Postal code: T3C
- Website: Westgate Community Association

Westgate is a residential area and a neighborhood in the southwest quadrant of Calgary, Alberta. It is bordered by Bow Trail to the north, 45 Street W to the east, 17 Avenue S to the south, and Sarcee Trail to the west. Edworthy Park is situated just north of the community.

The area was annexed to the City of Calgary in 1956 and Westgate was established in 1957. It is represented in the Calgary City Council by the Ward 6 councillor. Currently, Councillor Richard Pootmans represents the area as of 2024

== Demographics ==
In the City of Calgary's 2012 municipal census, Westgate had a population of 3,172 living in 1,334 dwellings, a 2.3% increase from its 2011 population of 3,101. With a land area of 1.2 km^{2} (0.46 sq mi), it had a population density of 2,640/km^{2} (6,850/sq mi) in 2012.

Residents in this community had a median household income of $54,309 in 2000, and there were 10.4% low income residents living in the neighbourhood. As of 2000, 14.2% of the residents were immigrants. A proportion of 14.6% of the buildings were condominiums or apartments, and 24.3% of the housing was used for renting.

== Education ==
The community is served by Vincent Massey Junior High and Westgate Bilingual Elementary schools.

== See also ==
- List of neighbourhoods in Calgary
