= Sarcee Trail =

Highway in Alberta

- Length: 18.0 km (11.2 mi); Southern section:8.9 km (5.5 mi); Northern section: 9.1 km (5.7 mi)
- Location: Calgary, Alberta, Canada
- South end: Highway 201
- Major junctions: Highway 1 Highway 1A; Highway 201
- North end: 144 Avenue NW

Sarcee Trail is a major limited-access road in Calgary, Alberta, Canada. It is divided into two portions, one in the south end of the city, and one in the north end of the city. Originally planned as one continuous route, plans to connect the two halves have been shelved as it would involve the demolition of homes in Bowness and the disruption of the Bowmont Natural Area park. The urban arterial road is named for the Tsuu T'ina, who were also known as the Sarcee.

== Route description ==
=== Southern section ===
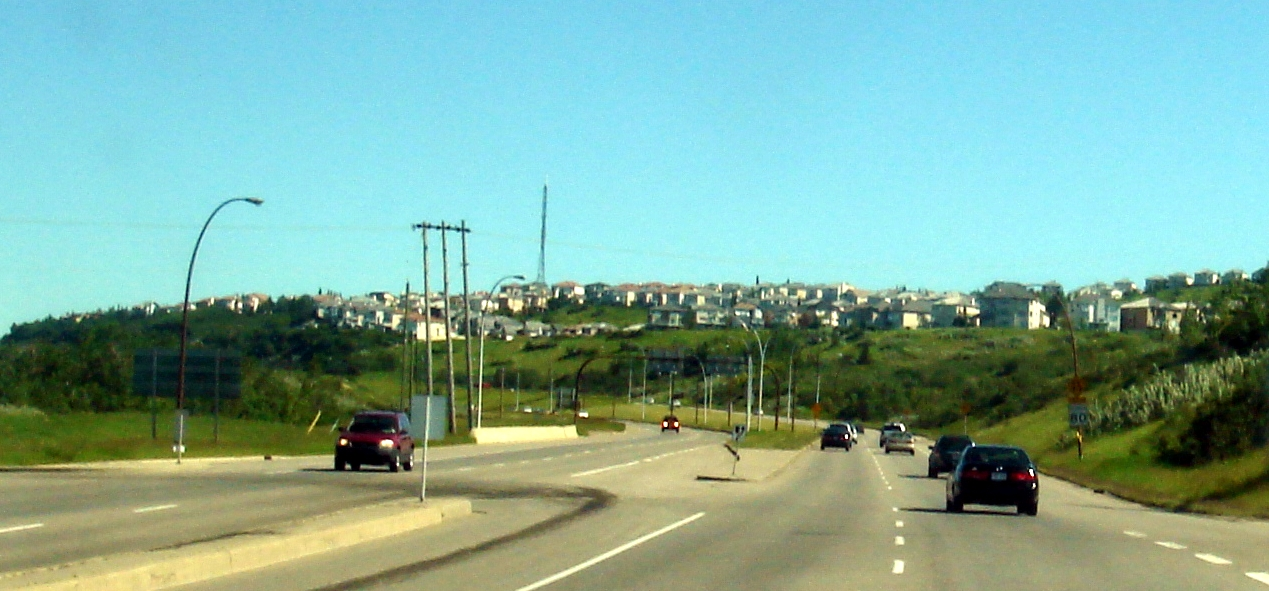
Sarcee Trail between Patterson and Edworthy Park

The 8.9-kilometre-long (5.5 mi) southern half of Sarcee Trail acts as a major connector between Glenmore Trail to the south and 16 Avenue NW in the west end of the city, though the road continues north into the community of Bowness at 34 Avenue NW. Sarcee Trail is signed as bypass route which connects Highway 1 west and Highway 2 south. Sarcee Trail crosses the divide between the southwest and northwest quadrants of the city at 16 Avenue NW.

Early plans for the city's southwest ring road called for Sarcee Trail to continue south from Glenmore, connecting eventually with Alberta Highway 22X. Although the extension has come to fruition, with construction having begun in 2016, it now carries the name Tsuut'ina Trail and is part of Alberta Highway 201. As part of the Tsuut'ina Trail project, the City of Calgary is also planning for construction of an interchange at Richmond Road.

=== Northern section ===
The 9.1-kilometre-long (5.7 mi) northern half of Sarcee Trail travels between the communities of Silver Springs in the south and Nolan Hill in the north. It starts at the intersection of Crowchild Trail and Silver Springs Gate. Heading northbound, Sarcee Trail continues along until it reaches 144 Avenue NW, acting as the divider between several communities along the way.

Silver Springs Gate, a short road leading into the Silver Springs community, was formerly part of Sarcee Trail until the mid-1990s when plans to extend the northern leg of Sarcee southward through the Bowmont Natural Area and Bowness community to connect with the south leg were abandoned. The renaming of this stretch of road was reported by local media as being intended to reassure residents that the extension plans would not be revived.

== Major intersections ==
From south to north. The entire route is in Calgary.

km	mi	Destinations	Notes
0.0	0.0	Highway 201 south (Tsuut'ina Trail)	Hwy 201 exit 22
0.3	0.19	Tsuut'ina Parkway	Partial cloverleaf interchange
0.8– 2.2	0.50– 1.4	Highway 201 west (Stoney Trail) / Glenmore Trail east	Combination interchange (Hwy 201 exit 22); southbound access to Tsuut'ina Parkway and Westhills Way
2.7	1.7	Richmond Road	Split intersection; interchange proposed
3.2	2.0	Signal Hill Centre	Southbound right-in/right-out
5.2	3.2	17 Avenue SW	Partial cloverleaf interchange
6.6	4.1	Bow Trail	Interchange proposed. Access to Downtown Calgary
9.7– 10.5	6.0– 6.5	Bowdale Crescent / Na'a Drive	Hybrid diamond interchange
9.7– 10.5	6.0– 6.5	Highway 1 (16 Avenue NW) – Banff	Partial cloverleaf interchange
10.7	6.6	34 Avenue NW	
Gap in route
12.9	8.0	Silver Springs Boulevard / Silver Springs Drive	South end of Silver Springs Gate; former Sarcee Trail
14.2	8.8	Highway 1A (Crowchild Trail)	Partial cloverleaf interchange; north end of Silver Springs Gate
15.6	9.7	John Laurie Boulevard	
17.7	11.0	Country Hills Boulevard	
19.3	12.0	Highway 201 (Stoney Trail)	Partial cloverleaf interchange (Hwy 201 exit 46)
20.3	12.6	112 Avenue NW	
21.1	13.1	Symons Valley Parkway	
23.3	14.5	144 Avenue NW	
1.000 mi = 1.609 km; 1.000 km = 0.621 mi: Closed/former; Incomplete access

== See also ==
- Transportation in Calgary
