= Aspen Woods, Calgary =

Aspen Woods
- Neighbourhood
- Location of Aspen Woods in Calgary
- Coordinates: 51°02′36″N 114°11′36″W
- Country: Canada
- Province: Alberta
- City: Calgary
- Quadrant: SW
- Ward: 6
- Established: 2001
- Annexed: 1956

Government
  - Mayor: Jeromy Farkas
  - Administrative body: Calgary City Council
  - Councillor: John Pantazopoulos (Independent)
- Elevation: 1,230 m (4,040 ft)

Population (2021)
  - Total: 9,435
- Postal code: T3H
- Website: Aspen Woods Community Association

Aspen Woods is a residential neighbourhood in the southwest quadrant of Calgary, Alberta, consisting mostly of acreages and single-family detached homes.

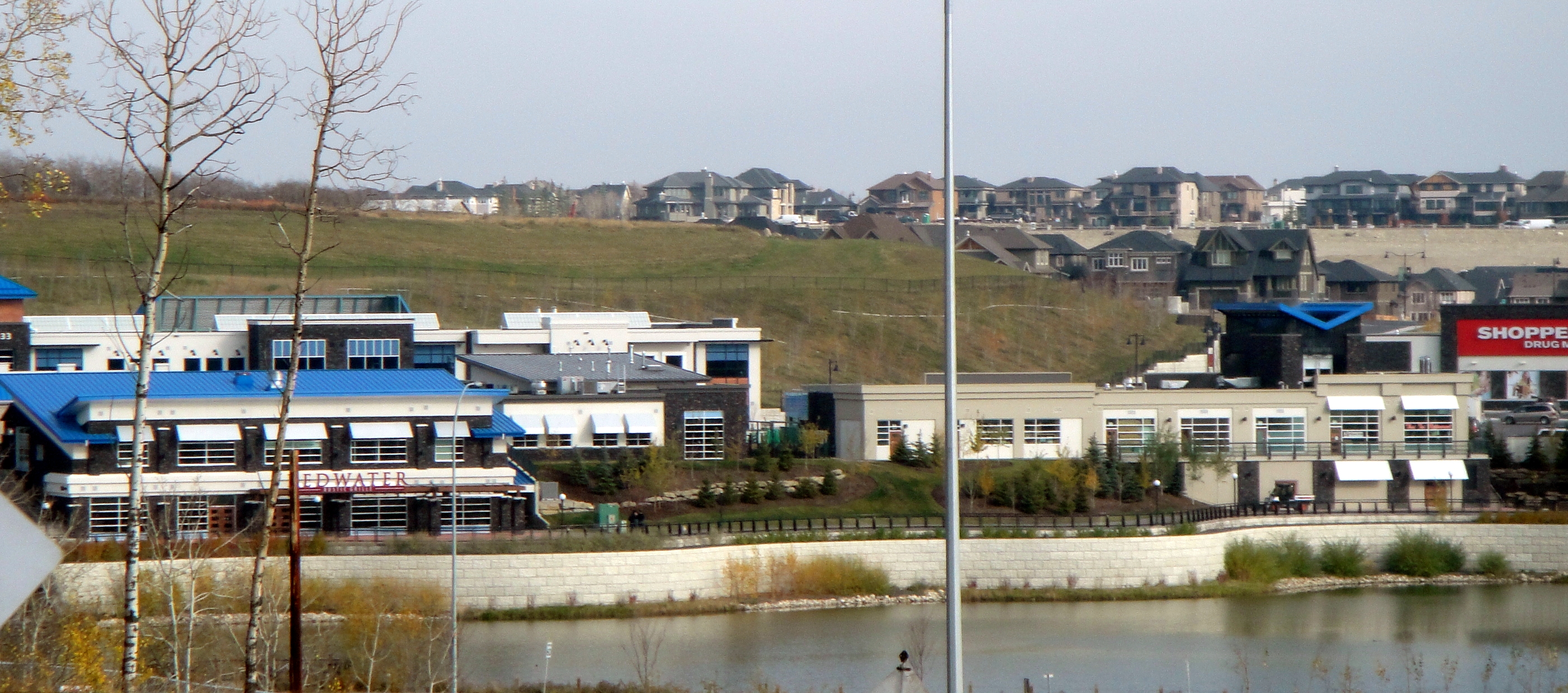
Aspen Landing commercial village

Aspen Woods was established as a neighbourhood in 2001, on land annexed to the City of Calgary in 1956. It is represented in the Calgary City Council by the Ward 6 councillor.

== Demographics ==
According to the 2021 Census of Canada, as compiled in the City of Calgary's Community Profiles, Aspen Woods had a population of 9,435 living in 3,000 private households, with an average household size of 3.1 people, among the largest of any Calgary community.

Median household income before tax was $182,000 in 2020, compared with a citywide median of $98,000, and about 7% of residents lived in a low-income household, compared with 9% across Calgary. Some 40% of residents were immigrants, compared with 33% city-wide, and 53% identified as members of a visible minority.

Of the community's private households, 83% were owner-occupied and 17% were rented, compared with 69% and 31% respectively across Calgary as a whole. Single-detached houses made up 77% of dwellings, with row houses accounting for 12% and low-rise apartments for 11%.

== See also ==
- List of neighbourhoods in Calgary
