= Edworthy Park =

Public park in Calgary, Alberta, Canada

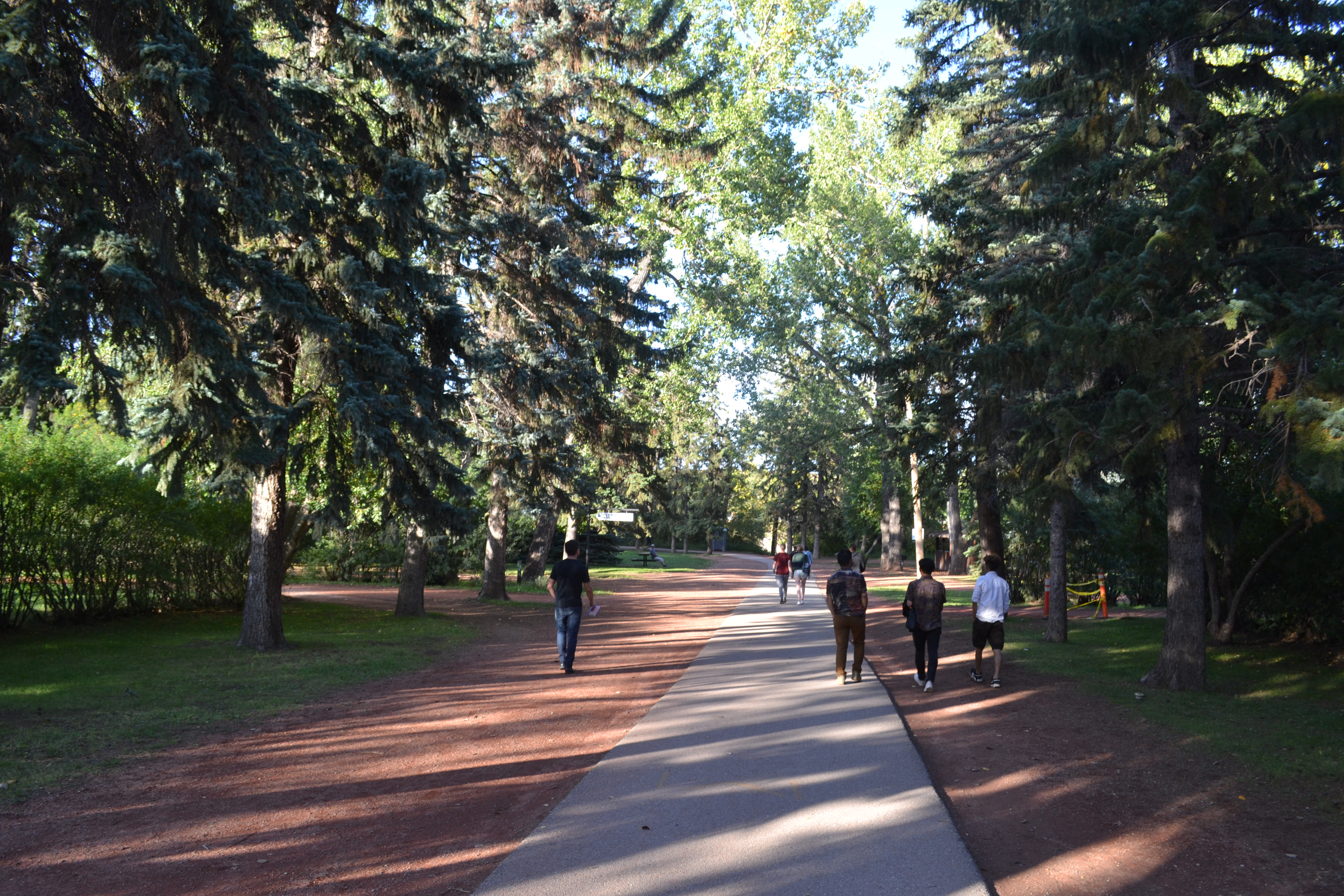
- Pathway in Edworthy Park

- Location within Calgary
- Type: Urban park
- Location: Calgary, Alberta
- Coordinates: 51°03′41″N 114°09′23″W
- Area: 1.27 square kilometres (0.49 sq mi)
- Created: ca. 1962
- Operator: City of Calgary
- Open: Year round

Edworthy Park is a city park located in the southwest section of Calgary along the south shore of the Bow River. The Canadian Pacific Railway crosses the length of the park. It was named after Thomas Edworthy, who immigrated to the Calgary area in 1883 from Devon, England.

The park has a surface of 1.27 square kilometres (0.49 sq mi), and contains over 5 kilometres (3.1 mi) of hiking and biking trails, part of the Bow River pathway.

== Nature ==
The trees that can be found in Edworthy Park include riparian woodland with aspen, willow and balsam poplar. There is also some grassland and mixed shrubland, and an escarpment where white spruce dominates. With the spruce is an isolated population of Douglas-fir, some more than 400 years old.

== History ==
Edworthy Park is built on the former site of a sandstone quarry. The land was purchased by the City of Calgary in 1962 for the development of the park.

Prior to the mid-1990s, the City of Calgary intended to eventually replace Edworthy Park with an extension of the Shaganappi Trail freeway. The extension would have linked Shaganappi Trail, Sarcee Trail, and Bow Trail at a major interchange that would take up most of the southwest part of Edworthy Park. During development of the Calgary Transportation Plan (also known as "The Go Plan") in 1995, public opposition to the roadway led to it being removed from future consideration.

== Gallery ==
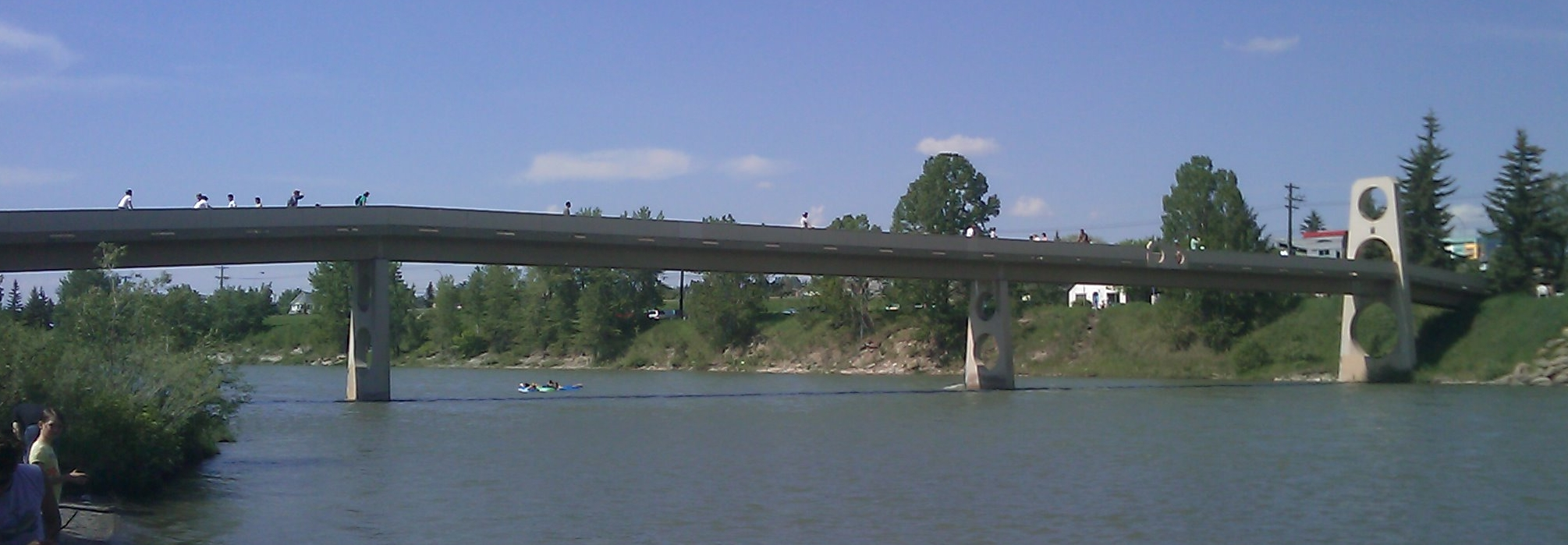
Harry Boothman Bridge from Edworthy Park to Shaganappi

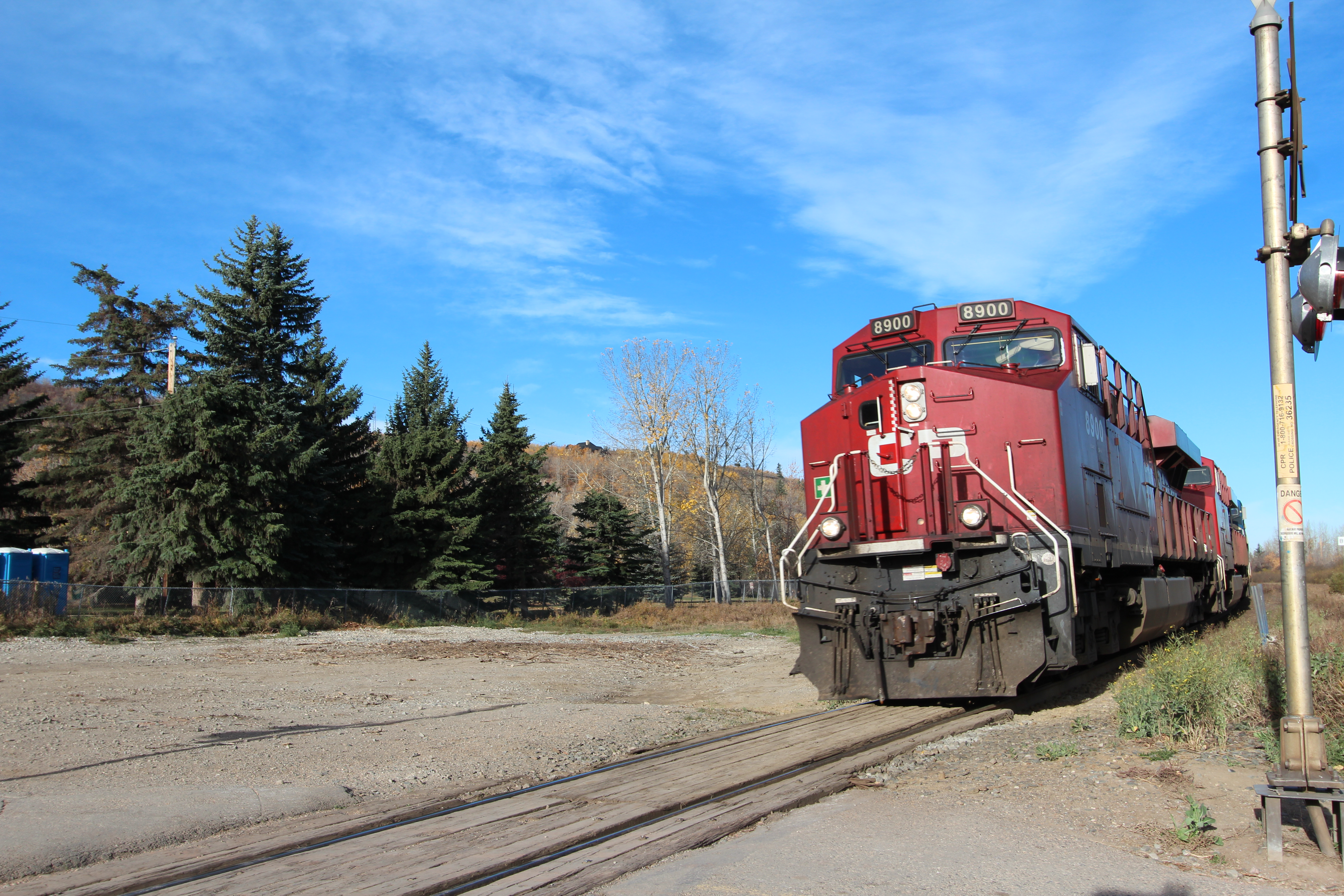
A train on the Canadian Pacific Railway crossing through the park

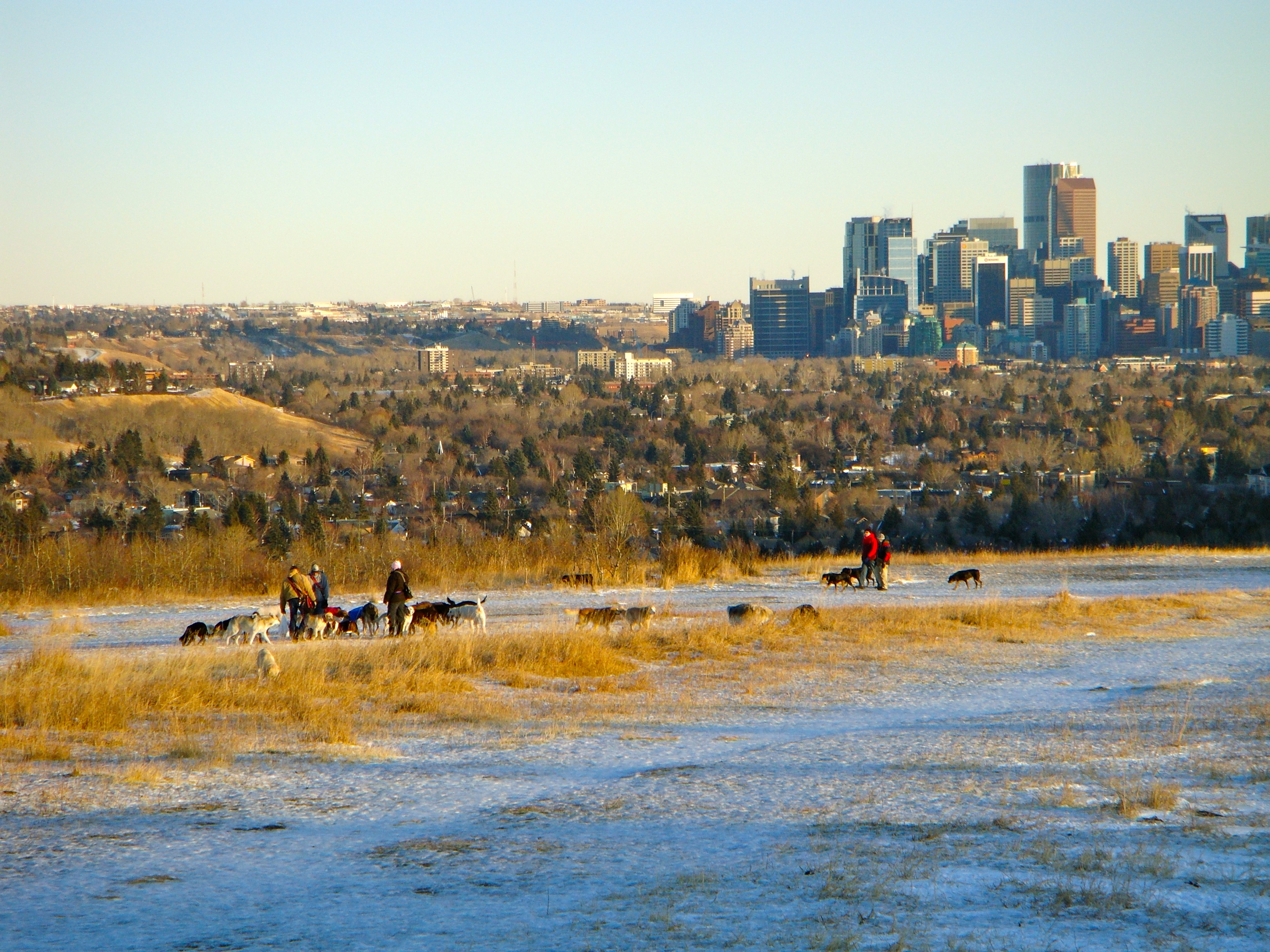
Edworthy Park also features an off-leash dog park
