= List of Calgary Transit bus routes =

This is a list of Calgary Transit bus routes.

== Standard Bus Routes ==
Route	Route Name	Route Details	Notes
1	Bowness / Forest Lawn	Bowness Terminal — Penbrooke Terminal via City Centre	
2	Mount Pleasant / Killarney-17 Avenue	Beddington (Bermuda Drive) — Glenside Drive Terminal via 78 Avenue Terminal (4 Street NW) and City Centre	A D40LF sitting at the 78th Avenue Terminal
3	Centre St / Sandstone	Heritage CTrain Station — Sandstone Terminal via City Centre, 78 Avenue Terminal.	
4; 5	Huntington; North Haven	Circular route: 78 Avenue Terminal — City Centre (5 Avenue S/6 Avenue S)	Route 4 runs clockwise, route 5 runs counterclockwise.
6	Killarney-26 Avenue	Westhills Towne Centre (Stewart Green) — City Centre (6 Avenue S)	
7	Marda Loop	54 Avenue Terminal — City Centre (7 Avenue S)	
8	North Pointe / Foothills Medical Centre	North Pointe Terminal — Foothills Hospital via Brentwood CTrain station and Alberta's Children Hospital	
9	Dalhousie / Chinook	Dalhousie CTrain Station — Chinook CTrain Station via Mount Royal University, Westbrook CTrain Station, Shaganappi Point CTrain Station, Foothills Medical Centre, University of Calgary.	
10	Macleod Trail	City Centre — Anderson CTrain station via Chinook CTrain station and Southcentre Mall	
11; 12	Southwest Loop; Southwest Loop	Circular Route: Fish Creek-Lacombe CTrain station — Somerset-Bridlewood CTrain station via Shawnessy CTrain station	Route 11 runs clockwise, route 12 runs counterclockwise.
13	Altadore	Westhills Towne Centre (Stewart Green) — City Centre (1 Street SW) via Mount Royal University	
14	Cranston / Bridlewood	South Health Campus — Bridlewood (24 Street W) via Somerset-Bridlewood CTrain station, South Health Campus	
15	Deerfoot Meadows	Southland CTrain Station — City Centre (1 Street SW)	Replaces routes 30, 106, 449. Shuttle service.
17	Renfrew / Ramsay	Ramsay (MacDonald Avenue) — Child Avenue Terminal via City Centre.	
19	16 Avenue North	Dalhousie C-Train Station, University of Calgary, Market Mall, North Hill Centre/North Hill Shopping Centre — Sunridge Mall via Lions Park CTrain station, Child Avenue Terminal, Vista Terminal, Peter Lougheed Centre, Rundle CTrain station.	
20	Heritage / Northmount Dr N	78 Avenue Terminal — Heritage C-Train Station via University of Calgary, Mount Royal University, Rockyview General Hospital.	
21; 55	Castleridge; Falconridge	Circular route: McKnight-Westwinds C-Train Station — Coral Springs (Coral Springs Boulevard)	Route 21 runs counterclockwise, route 55 runs clockwise.
22	Richmond Road	Westhills Towne Centre (Stewart Green) — City Centre (1 Street SW)	
23	52 Street E	Saddletowne C-Train Station — South Health Campus	
24	Ogden	City Centre (5 Avenue S) — Quarry Park	
26	Sarcee Trail Crosstown	Tuscany C-Train Station (Tuscany Terminal) - Westbrook C-Train Station	
28	Deer Run	Canyon Meadows C-Train Station — Deer Run (Deer Run Drive) via Deer Run Terminal	
29	Queensland	Anderson C-Train Station — Queensland (Deer Ridge Drive)	
32	Huntington / Sunridge	78 Avenue Terminal — Rundle C-Train Station.	
33	Vista Heights	Barlow/Max Bell C-Train Station — Rundle C-Train Station via Vista Terminal	Service short-turns at Vista Terminal during evenings and weekends.
34; 48	Pineridge; Rundle	Circular route: Rundle C-Train Station — Monterey Park (California Boulevard)	Route 34 runs clockwise, route 48 runs counterclockwise.
35	Bonavista / Canyon Meadows	Canyon Meadows (Canterbury Drive) — Lake Bonavista (Lake Bonavista Drive) via Anderson C-Train Station	
36; 41	Riverbend; Lynnwood	Chinook C-Train Station — Riverbend (Riverbend Drive) / Lynnwood (62 Avenue SE)	Route 36 runs through Riverbend first and then Lynnwood, route 41 runs through Lynnwood then Riverbend. Route 41 does not operate on Sundays.
37	Elbow Drive	Heritage C-Train Station — Canyon Meadows (6 Street SW)	
38	North Crosstown	Saddletowne C-Train Station — Brentwood C-Train Station via Whitehorn C-Train Station	
40	Crowfoot / North Hill	Crowfoot C-Train Station — Lions Park C-Train Station via Foothills Medical Centre	
42; 49	Marlborough; Forest Heights	Circular route: Marlborough C-Train Station — Penbrooke Terminal	Route 42 runs clockwise, route 49 runs counterclockwise. Route 42 serves Abbotsford Drive while Route 49 continues on Abbeydale Drive.
43	36 Street E	Whitehorn C-Train Station — Chinook CTrain Station via Marlborough C-Train Station, Rundle C-Train Station	
44	Deer Ridge / Avenida	Avenida Shopping Centre — Deer Ridge (Deer Ridge Drive)	No Sunday service.
46	MacEwan	78 Avenue Terminal — Sage Hill Terminal via Sandstone Terminal	Serving the north side of Beddington. Replace route 123.
47	Sandstone	78 Avenue Terminal — Sage Hill Terminal via Sandstone Terminal	Serving the south side of Beddington. Replace route 123.
51	West Springs / Discovery Ridge	69 Street SW C-Train Station — Discovery Ridge (Discovery Ridge Boulevard) / West Springs (Old Banff Coach Road)	
52	Evergreen / Somerset	Fish Creek-Lacombe C-Train Station — Somerset (Somerset Drive) via Shawnessy C-Train Station, Somerset-Bridlewood C-Train Station	
53	Brentwood/Greenwood	Brentwood C-Train Station — Greenwood via Market Mall	
54; 154	Edgevalley; Hamptons	Dalhousie C-Train Station — Hamptons (Hamptons Boulevard)	Route 54 runs counterclockwise, route 154 clockwise. Route 54 serves Hamptons Drive while Route 154 continues on Hamptons Boulevard.
56	Woodbine	Heritage C-Train Station — Anderson C-Train Station	
57	Monterey Park / McCall Way	Calgary International Airport (McCall Way) — Monterey Park (Laguna Way) via Whitehorn C-Train Station.	
58	44 Street SE / Erin Woods	Marlborough C-Train Station — Erin Woods (Erin Woods Dr)	
59; 159	Savanna; Saddlebrook	Circular route from Saddletowne C-Train Station — Savanna / Saddlebrook	Route 59 runs clockwise, route 159 runs counterclockwise.
60	Martindale	Saddletowne C-Train Station - McKnight-Westwinds C-Train Station via Martindale C-Train Station — Martindale	Route 60 runs serves Martindale. Replace route 85.
61	Taradale	Saddletowne C-Train Station — McKnight-Westwinds C-Train Station — Taradale	Route 61 runs serves Taradale. Replace route 71.
63	Alpine Park	Alpine Park (Alpine Ave) — Fish Creek-Lacombe C-Train Station	Peak hour shuttle service
65	Market Mall / Downtown West	Market Mall — Downtown West - Kerby C-train Station via Brentwood C-Train Station	
66	Lakeview	Lakeview (37 Street SW) — City Centre (1 Street SW)	
67	Memorial Drive	Marlborough C-Train Station — Penbrooke Terminal via Abbeydale	
68	68 Street E	McKnight-Westwinds C-Train Station — East Hills Plaza	
70	Temple	Saddletowne C-Train Station — Whitehorn C-Train Station via Temple	
74	Tuscany	Tuscany (Tuscany Way) — Tuscany C-Train Station	Route 74 serves Tuscany Way and into Tuscany Ravine before looping back to Tuscany Station. Replace route 174. Shuttle service.
75	Somerset / Mahogany	Somerset-Bridlewood C-Train Station — Mahogany (Masters Road) via South Health Campus	
76	Hawkwood	Crowfoot C-Train Station — Dalhousie C-Train Station via Hawkwood Terminal	
77	Edgemont	Dalhousie C-Train Station — Edgebrook Rise Terminal	
78	Sundance / Chaparral	Sundance (Sunbank Way) — Chaparral (Chaparral Drive) via Somerset-Bridlewood C-Train Station	7944 is seen operating route 78 Sundance at Somerset-Bridlewood LRT Station
79	Cranston / Mahogany	Cranston (Cranston Ave) — Mahogany (Masters Road) via South Health Campus	
80	Homestead	Homestead (Homestead Dr) — Saddletowne C-Train Station	
81	Highfield	Highfield Industrial — Southland Station via Chinook CTrain Station, Heritage C-Train Station, Southland C-Train Station	Replace route 30. No Sunday service.
82	Nolan Hill	Beacon Hill Shopping Center — Brentwood C-Train Station via Sage Hill Terminal	
83	Parkland	Canyon Meadows C-Train Station — Parkland (Parkvalley Drive)	
86	Coventry	North Pointe Terminal — 78 Avenue Terminal	Runs between Coventry Hills to Harvest Hills. Replace route 88.
87	17 Avenue SE / Applewood	Marlborough Station — Applewood (Applewood Drive)	
89	Lions Park / North Pointe Terminal	Lions Park C-Train Station — North Pointe Terminal - via (Berkshire Boulevard) Sandstone Terminal	Peak service only.
90	Bridgeland / University of Calgary	Bridgeland/Memorial C-Train Station- University of Calgary via City Centre and Foothills Medical Centre	
91	Foothills Medical Centre	Foothills Medical Centre — Lions Park C-Train Station.	
92	McKenzie Towne	Anderson C-Train Station — McKenzie Towne (52 Street SE) via Douglas Glen Terminal	
93	Coach Hill / Westbrook	69 Street SW C-Train Station — Westbrook C-Train Station via Richmond Terminal, 45 Street SW C-Train Station	
94	Strathcona / Signal Hill	69 Street SW C-Train Station — Signal Hill and Strathcona Park	
96	McKenzie	Anderson C-Train Station — McKenzie (McKenzie Lake Way)	
97; 113	South Ranchlands-Scenic Acres; North Ranchlands-Scenic Acres	Dalhousie C-train Station — Crowfoot C-Train Station — Scenic Acres	Route 97 runs clockwise in the community of Scenic Acres while route 113 runs counterclockwise. The two routes also travel through the community of Ranchlands via different routes. Route 113 does not operate on weekends.
98	Cougar Ridge	69 Street SW C-Train Station — Cougar Ridge (Cougar Ridge Drive)	
99	Oakridge / Acadia	Heritage C-Train Station — Oakridge (Oakfield Drive) via Southland C-Train Station	
100	Airport	North Pointe Terminal — Calgary International Airport — Saddletowne Station	A CNG Novabus arriving at the YYC International Terminal stop operating as a 100 North Pointe.
101	Inglewood	City Centre (5 Street SW) — Inglewood (17 Street SE)	
102	Millrise / Silverado	Somerset-Bridlewood C-Train Station — Shawnessy C-Train Station	
104	Sunnyside — University of Calgary	5th Street NW terminal — University of Calgary (University Dr) — Foothills Hospital	
105	Dalhousie — Lions Park	Dalhousie C-train Station — Lions Park C-Train Station	
108	Paskapoo Slopes	Crestmont (Cresthaven Rise) — Brentwood C-Train Station via Market Mall, Canada Olympic Park, Valley Springs Terminal, Valley Ridge Terminal	Renamed from route 408.
111	Old Banff Coach Road	West Springs — Westbrook Station	
114	Panorama	North Pointe Terminal — 78 Avenue Terminal	Runs between Panatella to Country Hills. replaces route 123 and 421.
115	Symons Valley Parkway	Tuscany Station — North Pointe Terminal via Sage Hill Terminal	
119	Freeport	Saddletowne C-Train Station — Aero Way	
120	Silver Springs	Crowfoot C-Train Station — Dalhousie C-train Station	Route 120 and 134 travel through the community of Silver Springs via different routes. Route 134 omits Crowfoot Station and heads west to Rockland Park (Nose Hill Drive)
124	Evanston	North Pointe — Evanston	
125; 126	Cedarbrae; Braeside	Circular route: Southland C-Train Station — Cedarbrae — Southland C-Train Station	Route 125 runs counterclockwise, route 126 runs clockwise. Route 125 does not operate on Weekends.
127	Franklin Industrial/Maryvale Dr.	Barlow/Max Bell Station — Marlborough Station	Service short-turns at Marlborough Station during evenings and weekends.
128	East Skyview Ranch / Redstone	Saddletowne C-Train Station — Redstone	
129	Dalhousie — Sage Hill	Dalhousie C-train Station — Sage Hill Terminal	
134	Rockland Park	Rockland Park — Dalhousie C-train Station	Route 120 and 134 travel through the community of Silver Springs via different routes. Route 134 heads west to Rockland Park. Route 134 does not operate on weekends.
135	36 Street SE / Erin Woods	Marlborough C-Train Station — Erin Woods (52 Street SE)	Peak service only.
136	Cornerbrook / Corner Meadows	Saddletowne Station — Cornerstone	
137	Livingston	Livingston (Livingston Hill) — North Pointe	Shuttle service off peak, conventional peak hours
138	Citadel	Tuscany C-Train Station — Crowfoot C-Train Station via Citadel Terminal	
145	West Skyview Ranch / Redstone	Cityscape Gate / Cityscape Dr — Saddletowne C-Train Station	
147	Starfield	39 Ave LRT Station — 68 Ave	
148	Great Plains	Chinook C-Train Station — Great Plains Industrial via Foothills Industrial, South Hill Terminal	
149	Point Trotter	Heritage C-Train Station — 107 Ave SE	
150	114 Ave SE	Anderson LRT Station — 114 Ave SE via Douglas Glen Terminal	No Sunday service.
152	New Brighton	McKenzie Towne Terminal — Copperfield Terminal via New Brighton (New Brighton Drive)	No weekend service.
153	Copperfield	Somerset-Bridlewood C-Train Station — Copperfield Terminal via McKenzie Towne Terminal	
155	West Dover / Forest Lawn	Dover (26 Street SE) — Forest Lawn (52 Street SE)	
156	Aspen Woods	69 Street SW C-Train Station — Aspen Woods (Cortina Drive)	
157	West Stoney Industrial	Saddletowne C-Train Station — Stoney Industrial (Stoney Boulevard) — North Pointe	
158	Royal Oak	Tuscany Station — Royal Oak (Royal Oak Drive)	
164	Aspen Summit	69 Street SW C-Train Station — Richmond Terminal via Aspen Summit (Aspen Summit Drive)	
167	Walden — Legacy	Somerset-Bridlewood C-Train Station(Shawville Way SE) — 210 Avenue SE (Legacy Village Rd)	
169	Rocky Ridge	Tuscany Station — Rocky Ridge (Twelve Mile Coulee Road)	
194	Chaparral Valley / Wolf Willow	Somerset-Bridlewood C-Train Station — Chaparral Valley SQ — Wolf Willow (Wolf Creek Ave)	No weekend service.
299	Arbour Lake	Arbour Lake (Arbour Ridge Way) — Crowfoot C-Train Station	
402	Heritage Park Shuttle (seasonal)	Heritage C-Train Station — Heritage Park	Seasonal service. Operational only when Heritage Park is open. Renamed from route 502.
404	North Hill	Briar Hill (22A Street NW) — Mount Pleasant (4 Street NW) via Lions Park C-Train Station	
414	14 Street Crosstown	North Haven (48 Avenue NW) — Bankview (19 Avenue SW) via Lions Park C-Train Station	
422	Dalhousie-Montgomery	Dalhousie C-train Station — Montgomery (Home Rd @ Bowness Rd) via Market Mall	
440	Chateau Estates	Chateau Estates (84 Street NE) — Franklin C-Train Station	Peak service only.
555	Dashmesh Centre	Martindale (Martindale Drive) — Whitehorn (44 Avenue N) via Rundle C-Train Station, Whitehorn C-Train Station	Sundays only service.

== Express Buses ==
Express routes, are peak-hour services that run in one direction in the morning and in the reverse direction in the afternoon. Historically, express bus stops are denoted with a red sign, but the use has been abandoned since 2000 in favor of a unified scheme.

Route	Service Area	Route Details	Notes
62	Hidden Valley	Hidden Valley (Hidden Valley Drive) — City Centre (5 Avenue S/6 Avenue S) via 78 Avenue Terminal	
64	MacEwan	Sandstone Terminal — City Centre (5 Avenue S/6 Avenue S) via 78 Avenue Terminal	Seen here is 7731 on the 64 MacEwan Express.
109	Harvest Hills	Harvest Hills (Harvest Gold Circle) — City Centre (5 Avenue S/6 Avenue S)	
116	Coventry Hills	Coventry (Coventry Hills Way) — City Centre (5 Avenue S/6 Avenue S)	
117	Mckenzie Towne	Mckenzie Towne Terminal — City Centre (5 Avenue S/6 Avenue S)	
131	East Bow	Cranston (Cranston Drive) — City Centre (5 Avenue S/6 Avenue S/7 Avenue S) via Ogden Road/24th St SE/Douglasdale Blvd/Mt. Mckenzie Dr	Replaces routes 102, 103, 110, and 133. Provides Similar coverage to the Communities of Douglas Glen, Douglasdale, McKenzie Lake, and Cranston.
142	Panorama	Panorama Hills (Harvest Hills Boulevard) — City Centre (5 Avenue S/6 Avenue S) via 78 Avenue Terminal, North Pointe Terminal	
151	New Brighton	Copperfield Terminal — City Centre (5 Avenue S/6 Avenue S) via Douglas Glen Terminal	
504	Stampede Park North via Centre Street	North Pointe Terminal — Stampede Park via 78 Avenue Terminal	Seasonal service. Only operates during Calgary Stampede.
507	Stampede Park Southeast	McKenzie Towne Terminal — Stampede Park	Seasonal service. Only operates during Calgary Stampede.

== BRT and MAX ==
Calgary Transit's BRT routes has very few features of a modern bus rapid transit system, with limited stop service and signal priority being implemented (originally, the use of articulated buses was also a feature, but the use has spread to some high-volume local express routes). BRT in Calgary is meant to be a placeholder for soon-to-be-constructed LRT routes. BRT routes stop only at designated stops with red shelters.

Service from Calgary International Airport on Route 500 formerly Route 300 uses 2013-2014 New Flyers fitted with luggage racks at the front of the bus.

On Nov 19, 2018, Calgary Transit introduced 3 new MAX routes. MAX has shelters with heat, light, and doors. A fourth MAX route was introduced on December 23, 2019.

On September 5th, 2023, the 305 was decommissioned from service during the 2023 Fall service change. On September 1st, 2025, the 301 became the MAX Green Line as part of the 2025 Fall service change.

Route	Service Area	Route Details	Notes
302	BRT Southeast / City Centre	South Health Campus — City Centre (5 Street SW) via McKenzie Towne Terminal and Douglas Glen Terminal	
500	Airport Express	City Centre (9 Avenue SE) — Calgary International Airport via 78 Avenue Terminal	
503	Symons Valley Express	City Centre (5 Avenue SW) — Sage Hill Terminal via 78 Avenue Terminal	
	MAX Green North Pointe / City Centre	North Pointe Terminal — 7 Street Southwest station via City Centre, 78 Avenue Terminal	7980 is seen here on Harvest Hills Blvd as a 301 BRT City Centre.
MAX Orange (Calgary)	MAX Orange Saddletowne / Brentwood	Saddletowne station — Brentwood station via Rundle station, Foothills Hospital, Alberta Children's Hospital	
MAX Yellow (Calgary)	MAX Yellow Woodpark / City Centre	Woodpark Boulevard (24 Street SW) — City Centre (1 Street SE) via Rockyview General Hospital, Mount Royal University	
	MAX Teal Westbrook / Douglas Glen	Westbrook station — Douglas Glen Terminal via Heritage station, Rockyview General Hospital, Mount Royal University	
	MAX Purple East Hills / City Centre	East Hills Plaza — City Centre	Extended trip to Chestermere from East Hills Plaza twice a day during morning and afternoon rush hours.

== School Service ==
These routes service various schools en route on school days only. School Service is not a chartered service, and is available for travel by any fare-paid passenger. Services stop at all Calgary Transit bus stops along the intended service area, beyond which service continues nonstop to the school.

Route	Service Area	Route Details	Notes
698	17th Ave / Western Canada / St. Mary's	St. Mary's High School — 69 Street SW Station	Western Canada High School students get off at 17 Avenue SW at 6th Street SW.
699	West Springs / Various Schools	Central Memorial High School — Cougar Ridge (Old Banff Coach Road)	Referred to as Cougar Ridge / West Springs / Various Schools on the route map. St Joan of Arc School students get off at 85 Street SW at Wentworth Drive. Ernest Manning High School students get off at 69 Street SW at Springborough Boulevard. A.E. Cross School students get off at Richmond Rd at Glenway Drive Southwest. Bishop Carroll High School students get off at Richard Rd at Bishop Carroll High.
703	Churchill / Sherwood	Sir Winston Churchill High School - Sherwood (Sherwood Boulevard)	
704	Churchill / Edgepark Boulevard	Sir Winston Churchill High School — Edgemont (Edgepark Boulevard) via Hamptons Terminal	
705	Sir Winston Churchill / Edgebrook Rise	Sir Winston Churchill High School — Edgebrook Rise Terminal	
706	Churchill / Edenwold Drive	Sir Winston Churchill High School — Hamptons Terminal	Referred to as Churchill / Edgemont on the route map.
708	Centennial / Chaparral	Centennial High School — Chaparral (Walden Drive SE)	
711	Beaverbrook / Douglasglen	Lord Beaverbrook High School — Douglasdale (Douglasdale Boulevard)	
712	Beaverbrook / Parkland	Lord Beaverbrook High School — Parkland Terminal	
713	Beaverbrook / Deer Run	Lord Beaverbrook High School — Deer Run Terminal	
714	Beaverbrook / Prestwick	Lord Beaverbrook High School — Mckenzie Towne (Mckenzie Towne Boulevard)	Referred to as Beaverbrook / Prestwick / McKenzie Towne on the route map, most likely to avoid confusion with route 720.
715	Beaverbrook / Queensland	Lord Beaverbrook High School — Deer Ridge (Queensland Drive)	Referred to as Beaverbrook / Deer Ridge on the route map.
716	Beaverbrook / New Brighton	Lord Beaverbrook High School — New Brighton (New Brighton Drive)	
717	Beaverbrook / Copperfield	Lord Beaverbrook High School — Copperfield (Copperpond Boulevard)	
718	Beaverbrook / Douglasdale	Lord Beaverbrook High School — Douglasdale (Mount McKenzie Drive) via Douglasbank Way Terminal	
719	Beaverbrook / McKenzie	Lord Beaverbrook High School — McKenzie (McKenzie Drive)	Referred to as Beaverbrook / Mckenzie Park on the route map.
720	Beaverbrook / Prestwick	Lord Beaverbrook High School — Prestwick (52 Street SE)	
721	Bowness / Valley Ridge	Bowness High School — Valley Ridge (Valley Springs Road)	Referred to as Bowness / Valley Ridge / Crestmont on the route map.
722	Bowness / Tuscany Ravine	Bowness High School — Tuscany (Tuscany Ravine Road)	
724	Bowness / Tuscany North	Bowness High School — Tuscany (Tuscany Boulevard)	Not to be confused with route 726 of the same name. Begins pick up/drop off service on Tuscany Springs Boulevard. PM route takes Stoney Trail into Tuscany.
725	Bowness / Silver Springs	Bowness High School — Silver Springs (Silverdale Drive)	
726	Bowness / Tuscany North	Bowness High School — Tuscany (Tuscany Boulevard)	Not to be confused with route 724 of the same name. Begins pick up/drop off service on Tusslewood Drive. PM route takes Crowchild Trail/12 Mile Coulee Road into Tuscany.
728	Bowness / Cougar Ridge	Bowness High School — Cougar Ridge (Old Banff Coach Road)	
731	Ernest Manning / West Springs	Ernest Manning High School — Westland Estates (73 St SW)	AM service begins at 9 Avenue SW at 81 Street SW. PM service ends prior to this at 73 Street SW at Westpoint Close SW.
732	Central Memorial / Glamorgan	Central Memorial High School — Discovery Ridge (Discovery Ridge Boulevard)	Referred to as Central Memorial / Discovery Ridge on the route map.
733	Central Memorial / Lakeview	Central Memorial High School — Lakeview (Crowchild Trail)	
734	Diefenbaker / Evanston	John G. Diefenbaker High School — Evanston (Symons Valley Parkway)	
736	Diefenbaker / Evanston	John G. Diefenbaker High School — Evanston (Symons Valley Py)	
745	Crescent Heights / Vista Heights	Crescent Heights High School — Vista Heights Terminal	
750	Fowler / Castleridge	James Fowler High School — Castleridge (Castleridge Boulevard) via Falconshire Drive Station	
751	Fowler / Coral Springs / Falconridge	James Fowler High School — Falconridge (Falconridge Boulevard)	Two buses, during the AM service, one starts at Falconridge Drive, other starts at 68 Street NE.
752	Fowler / Redstone	James Fowler High School — Skyview Ranch (52 Street NE)	Two buses, during the AM service, one starts on Skyview Close, other starts on Redstone Drive. Both PM buses start dropoffs on Skyview Close.
753	Fowler / Livingston	James Fowler High School — Livingston (140 Avenue NW)	
754	Fowler / Saddletowne Station	James Fowler High School — Saddletowne station	
755	Fowler / Skyview	James Fowler High School — Skyview Ranch (Country Hills Boulevard)	Referred to as Fowler / Skyview Ranch / Redstone on the route map. Two buses, during the AM service, one starts on 52 St NE, other starts on Redstone Street.
756	Fowler / Cornerstone	James Fowler High School — Cornerstone (Country Hills Boulevard)	
760	Scarlett / West Bonavista	Dr. E.P. Scarlett High School — Lake Bonavista (Canyon Meadows Drive)	Bus makes a stop in front of Robert Warren School after drop off/pick up
762	Scarlett / Bonavista	Dr. E.P. Scarlett High School — Lake Bonavista (Bonaventure Drive)	Bus makes a stop in front of Robert Warren School after drop off/pick up
764	Scarlett / James McKevitt Road	Dr. E.P. Scarlett High School — Somerset-Bridlewood C-Train Station via Fish Creek-Lacombe C-Train Station	Bus makes a stop in front of Robert Warren School after drop off/pick up
765	Scarlett / Silverado	Dr. E.P. Scarlett High School — Silverado (Belmont Street SW)	Bus makes a stop in front of Robert Warren School after drop off/pick up
766	Scarlett / Evergreen	Dr. E.P. Scarlett High School — Evergreen (Everstone Boulevard) via Fish Creek-Lacombe C-Train Station	Bus makes a stop in front of Robert Warren School after drop off/pick up
767	Dr. E.P. Scarlett / Anderson	Dr. E.P. Scarlett High School — Anderson station (Calgary)	Uses Route 10 Bus Stop at Anderson Station. Bus makes a stop in front of Robert Warren School after drop off/pick up
768	Scarlett / Legacy	Dr. E.P. Scarlett High School — Legacy (Legacy Boulevard SE)	Bus makes a stop in front of Robert Warren School after drop off/pick up
771	Robert Thirsk / Nolan Hill	Robert Thirsk High School — Nolan Hill (Nolan Hill Boulevard)	
772	Robert Thirsk / Citadel	Robert Thirsk High School — Citadel (Nose Hill Drive)	
773	Robert Thirsk / Rocky Ridge	Robert Thirsk High School — Rocky Ridge (Country Hills Boulevard)	
774	Robert Thirsk / Royal Oak	Robert Thirsk High School — Royal Oak (Country Hills Boulevard)	
776	Wise Wood / Palliser / Oakridge	Henry Wise Wood High School — Palliser (Southland DR)	Referred to as Henry Wise Wood / Oakridge / Palliser on the route map.
778	Wise Wood / Woodlands	Henry Wise Wood High School — Woodbine (24 Street SW)	
779	Wise Wood / Riverbend	Henry Wise Wood High School — Ogden (Ogden Rd) via Riverbend Station	Referred to as Wise Wood / Ogden / Riverbend on the route map
780	Henry Wise Wood / Oakridge	Henry Wise Wood High School — Oakridge (Southland Drive) via Southland Leisure Centre	
782	H.D. Cartwright / Nolan Hill	H.D. Cartwright School — Nolan Hill (Nolan Hill Boulevard)	
783	Gordon Higgins / Temple	Dr. Gordon Higgins School — Temple (Temple Drive) via Whitehorn Drive Station	
786	John Ware / Woodbine	John Ware School — Woodbine (Woodpark BV)	
789	A.E. Cross / Signal Hill	A.E. Cross School - Signal Hill (17th Avenue SW at 69 Street West LRT Station)	
793	Queen Elizabeth / Sunnyside	Queen Elizabeth Junior/Senior High School — Sunnyside C-Train Station	
794	F.E. Osborne / Silver Springs	F. E. Osborne Junior High School — Silver Springs (Silverdale Drive)	
795	F.e. Osborne / Sage Hill	F. E. Osborne Junior High School — Sage Hill (Sage Hill Drive)	
796	Tom Baines / Edgemont	Tom Baines Junior High School — Edgemont (Edgepark Boulevard) via Edgebrook Rise Terminal	
797	Tom Baines / Hamptons	Tom Baines Junior High School — Hamptons (Edgemont Boulevard) via Hamptons Terminal	
798	Annie Gale / Taradale	Annie Gale Junior High School - Taradale (Taravista Drive)	
799	Annie Gale / Coral Springs	Annie Gale Junior High School — Coral Springs (Coral Springs Boulevard)	
801	Brebeuf / Royal Oak / Rocky Ridge	St. Jean Brebeuf Junior High School — Rocky Ridge (Rocky Ridge Boulevard) via Royal Oak (Country Hills Boulevard)	
802	Brebeuf / Hawkwood	St. Jean Brebeuf Junior High School — Hawkwood (Hawkwood Road) via Hawkwood Terminal and Dalhousie LRT Station	Referred to as Brebeuf / Hawkwood / Dalhousie on the route map.
809	St Francis / Nolan Hill / Edgemont	St. Francis High School — Nolan Hill (Nolan Hill Gate)	
811	St. Francis / Tuscany	St. Francis High School — Tuscany (Tuscany Boulevard)	
812	St. Francis / East Arbour Lake / Citadel	St. Francis High School — Citadel Terminal	Referred to as St Francis / Citadel / Arbour Lake on the route map.
813	St. Francis / Arbour Lake / Scenic Acres / Silver Springs	St. Francis High School — Arbour Lake (Arbour Lake Way)	
814	St. Francis / Royal Oak	St. Francis High School — Royal Oak (Country Hills Boulevard)	
815	St. Francis / South Ranchlands / Arbour Lake	St. Francis High School — Arbour Lake (Arbour Ridge Way)	Referred to as St Francis / Arbour Lake / Ranchlands on the route map.
816	St. Francis / East Hawkwood / Citadel	St. Francis High School — Citadel Terminal	Referred to as St Francis / Citadel / Hawkwood on the route map.
817	St. Francis / Rocky Ridge	St. Francis High School — Rocky Ridge (Country Hills Boulevard)	
818	St. Francis / Sherwood / Hamptons / Edgemont	St. Francis High School — Sherwood (Sherview Drive) via Hamptons Terminal	
819	St. Francis / Nolan Hill	St. Francis High School — Nolan Hill (Nolan Hill Gate)	
820	St. Francis / Scenic Acres North	St. Francis High School — Scenic Acres (Scenic Acres Boulevard)	
821	Bishop O'Byrne / McKenzie / Mountain Park	Bishop O'Byrne High School — McKenzie Lake (McKenzie Lake Boulevard)	Referred to as Bishop O’Byrne / McKenzie on the route map.
823	Bishop Mcnally / Redstone / Skyview	Bishop Mcnally School — Skyview (Skyview Ranch Road)	
825	Bishop Carroll / Mckenzie Towne Express	Bishop Carroll High School - Mckenzie Towne (52 Street SE)	
826	Bishop Carroll / Dalhouse / Brentwood	Bishop Carroll High School — Dalhousie C-Train station via Brentwood C-Train station	
832	Madeline D'Houet / North Pointe	Madeline D'Houet School — North Pointe Terminal via Country Hills Boulevard Station	
833	Madeline D'Houet / Brentwood / Dalhousie	Madeline D'Houet School — Dalhousie C-Train Station via Brentwood C-Train Station	
835	St. Bonaventure / Anderson	St. Bonaventure School — Anderson C-Train Station	Service in PM only
836	St. Vincent de Paul / Scenic Acres	St. Vincent de Paul School — Scenic Acres (Scurfield Drive)	
839	Our Lady of Grace / Evanston	Our Lady of Grace School —Evanston (Evanston Way)	Service in AM only
844	Notre Dame / Evanston	Notre Dame High School — Evanston (Symons Valley Parkway)	Service in PM only
845	Msgr J.S. Smith / Mahogany	Monsignor J.S. Smith School — Mahogany (Mahogany Gate)	
848	Our Lady of the Rockies / New Brighton	Our Lady of the Rockies School — New Brighton (New Brighton Drive)	
849	Our Lady of the Rockies / Douglasdale	Our Lady of the Rockies School — Douglasdale (52 Street SE)	
851	St. Augustine / Lynnwood / Ogden	St. Augustine School — Lynnwood (69 Avenue SE) via Chinook C-Train Station	
853	St. Augustine / Riverbend	St. Augustine School — Riverbend Station	
858	St. Stephen / Legacy	St. Stephen School — Legacy (Legacy Boulevard)	
862	All Saints High / Cranston North	All Saints High School — Seton (Seton Way)	
863	All Saints High/ Mahogany / Cranston	All Saints High School — Mahogany (52 Street)	
864	All Saints High / Auburn Bay	All Saints High School — Auburn Bay (52 Street)	
865	All Saints High / Silverado	All Saints High School — Silverado (Silverado Way)	
866	All Saints High / Cranston	All Saints High School — Cranston (Cranston Avenue)	
867	All Saints High / Chaparral	All Saints High School — Chaparal (Chapala Drive)	
869	All Saints High / Somerset-Bridlewood Station	All Saints High School — Somerset–Bridlewood C-Train station	Service in PM only
871	St. Martha School / Marlborough	St. Martha School — Marlborough C-Train station	Service in PM only
872	St. Alphonsus / Rundle	St. Alphonsus School — Rundle C-Train station	Service in PM only
873	Our Lady of Peace / Shawnessy	Our Lady Of Peace School — Shawnessy (Shawville Way)	PM only
877	Father James Whelihan School / Walden	Father James Whelihan School — Walden (Walden Boulevard)	
878	Father James Whelihan / Chaparral	Father James Whelihan School — Chaparal (Chaparal Valley Drive)	
879	Christ The King / Cranston	Christ the King School — Cranston (Cranston Avenue)	
880	St. Matthew / Heritage	St. Matthew School — Heritage C-Train Station	
882	Blessed Marie-Rose / Nolan Hill	Blessed Marie-Rose School — Nolan Hill (Nolan Hill Boulevard)	Service in PM only
887	St. Elizabeth Seton / Panorama Hills	St. Elizabeth Seton School — Panorama Hills (Country Hills Boulevard)	
890	St John Henry Newman / Seton	St John Henry Newman School — Seton (Seton Way)	
892	St. Isabella / McKenzie	St. Isabella School — McKenzie Towne (Mckenzie Towne Link)	Service in PM only
894	St. Gregory / 69 St SW / Strathcona	St. Gregory School — Strathacona (Strathacona Drive) via 69 Street C-Train station	
895	St. Gregory / West Springs/ Cougarridge	St. Gregory School — Cougarridge (69 Street Sw) via 69 Street C-Train station	
896	LOA / Valley Ridge / Crestmont	Our Lady of Assumption School — Valley Ridge (Valley Ridge Drive)	

== See also ==
- Transportation in Calgary
