= Robert Thirsk High School =

Location
- 8777 Nose Hill Drive N.W, Calgary, Alberta; Canada; 51.13074°N 114.19493°W

Information
- Type: Public
- Established: 2013
- School board: Calgary Board of Education
- Principal: Mandy Hambidge
- Grades: 10-12
- Enrollment: 1381 (2022 - 2023)
  - Grade 10: 450
  - Grade 11: 399
  - Grade 12: 374
- Team name: Comets
- Communities served: Citadel, Arbour Lake, Scenic Acres, Ranchlands, Hawkwood, Rocky Ridge, Nolan Hill, Glacier Ridge, and Royal Oak
- Website: school.cbe.ab.ca/school/robertthirsk/Pages/default.aspx

Robert Thirsk High School is a public senior high school in Calgary, Alberta, Canada. It derives its name from Robert Thirsk, a Canadian engineer and physician, and a former Canadian Space Agency astronaut. The high school is located in the Northwest Calgary community of Arbour Lake, and has a capacity of 1,500 students.

Robert Thirsk High School officially opened in September 2013. Over 800 grade 10 and 11 students attend the first school year. The high school accommodates students from Citadel, Arbour Lake, Scenic Acres, Ranchlands, Hawkwood, Rocky Ridge, Royal Oak, Glacier Ridge, and Nolan Hill.

The school offers career skills and fine arts programming, including:

- Electro-technologies
- Computer Sciences
- Tech Theater
- Construction
- Cook trade
- Health and human services
- Media, design and communication
- Natural sciences
- Drama
- Dance
- Band
- Visual arts

The school is also home for some students who have special needs and attend the Adapted Learning Program.
