= Marlborough station =

Light rail station in Calgary, Alberta, Canada

Marlborough
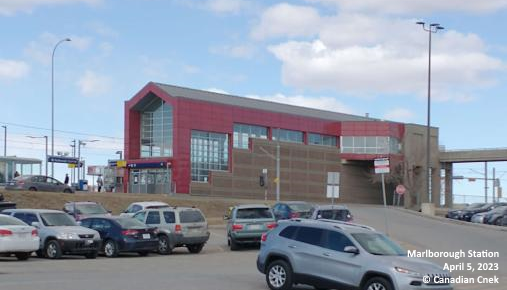

General information
- Location: 889 - 36 Street NE
- Coordinates: 51°03′32″N 113°58′54″W
- Owner: Calgary Transit
- Line: Blue Line (202)
- Platforms: Center-loading platform
- Connections: 42 Marlborough; 43 36 Street East; 49 Forest Heights; 58 44 Street/Erin Woods; 67 Memorial Drive East; 87 17 Ave SE/Applewood; 127 Maryvale/Franklin Industrial; 135 36 Street/Erin Woods

Construction
- Structure type: At-grade
- Accessible: yes

History
- Opened: 1985; 41 years ago
- Rebuilt: 2017; 9 years ago

Services
Preceding station	Calgary Transit	Following station
Franklin toward 69 Street	Blue Line	Rundle toward Saddletowne
Location

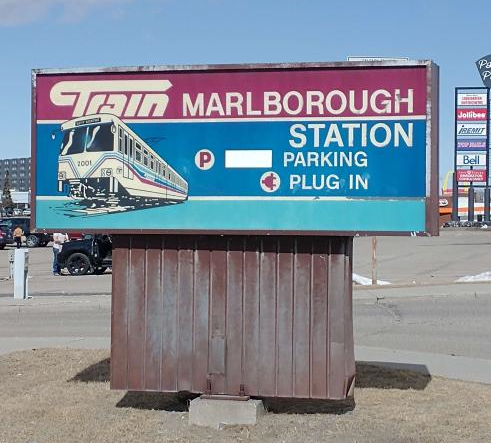
The sign located in the parking lot of Marlborough Station

Marlborough Station is a Calgary C-Train light rail station in the Calgary Northeast neighbourhood of Marlborough. It serves the Northeast Leg of the Blue Line and opened on April 27, 1985, as part of the original Northeast (202) line.

The station is located in the median of 36 Street NE, located near its intersection with 8 Avenue NE/Marlborough Drive NE. The station is 6.5 km (4.0 mi) from the City Hall Interlocking and is located near Calgary's Marlborough neighbourhood and also serves nearby businesses along 36 Street NE, including Marlborough Mall. Pedestrian overpasses connect the station to both sides of 36 Street NE. Stairs, escalators, as well as an elevator provide access down to the center-loading platform. 485 spaces of the mall facility are now owned by Calgary Transit and are designated for park-and-ride service.

In 2005, the station registered an average transit of 19,600 boardings per weekday, the busiest station in the system other than the downtown platforms.

== Station upgrades ==
As part of Calgary Transit's plan to operate 4-car trains by the end of 2014, all 3-car platforms have been extended. Marlborough station saw new furnishings in addition to a platform extension. Construction started in the late Summer of 2013, and was finished in January 2014.

Calgary Transit, in collaboration with Shaw Communications, announced on November 16, 2016, that 8 new locations for Public Wi-Fi services would be added to the Calgary C-Train system. These new locations would add public Wi-Fi to 18 new stations; including Marlborough Station. These changes were done as they would improve transit experience for their users, which would improve customer commitment.

As part of station upgrades with Marlborough along with Rundle, the interiors of the two stations were renovated starting in June 2016 and finishing in December 2017. This was to bring the two stations up to the same standard as Whitehorn Station which was renovated in 2011. These renovations would include: modifications to the stations layout to improve traffic such as changing the location of the elevators, replacement of the escalators and removal of the 'down' escalator, improvement and increasing of security cameras, upgraded heating and ventilation. These changes would also come with a complete overhaul of the interior design of the two stations, coming with a new modernistic design that was generally cleaner and less dated (in comparison to the old design which featured gothic designs, with heavy use of bricks and was overall dark and dimly lit).

== Transit connections ==
Bus connections to Marlborough station as of 31 August, 2026:

- 42 - Marlborough (Clockwise)
- 43 - 36 Street East Chinook (South) / 43 - 36 Street East Whitehorn (North)
- 49 - Forest Heights (Counterclockwise)
- 58 - Erin Woods / 44 Street SE (South)
- 67 - Memorial Drive E (East)
- 87 - 17 Avenue SE (East)
- 127 - Franklin Industrial (West) / 127 - Maryvale (East)
- 135 - Erin Woods / 36 Street SE (South)

== Crime ==
Marlborough Station has been criticized for being a crime hotspot in the Calgary C-Train System. On a CityNews interview in January 2022 with Calgary Transit Lead Staff 'Stephen Tauro', it was listed as one of the 5 stations with an unusually high crime rate. The others being: Rundle, Southland, Heritage and Sunalta Stations.

During the month of March 2023, an underground drug operation along the Calgary C-Train system would get disrupted. Officers seized the substances of fentanyl, methamphetamine, cocaine, morphine, and Xanax. Multiple weapons such as 21 knives, two machetes, two hatchets, a handgun, and a can of bear spray were also seized by police. 40 people would get arrested between multiple stations, Marlborough Station along with Franklin, Southland, Heritage, Sunalta, Rundle, Whitehorn, Brentwood, Chinook, Crowfoot, 8th Street SW, Anderson, Dalhousie, Westbrook Stations would have arrests relating to the aforementioned drug trade.

At around 1:30 PM on October 27, 2021, police received a call of an assault from Marlborough LRT Station. Police found the man directly outside the station had been stabbed and was in life threatening condition. Days later, the man died due to his injuries in hospital.

On November 6, 2021, concerns were raised after an online video spread around showing Calgary police officers at Marlborough LRT Station with their guns out. This was after police got calls of 2 men with a firearm out, and 1 man with a machete.

Woman attacks random woman with a hatchet at the Marlborough LRT Station during the evening of November 6, 2022. The woman behind the attack, along with a suspected accomplice were arrested.

On Thursday November 17, 2022, a brawl started between multiple people at Marlborough Station. Originally starting with poles/battens, fight escalates after person with blue jacket shoots a flare gun at the head of one of the other people. Victim of the flare attack jumps at person with blue jacket and attempts to knock them down with the batten, but is shot at again with a flare. The fight started originally near the exit on the upper-level on the eastern half of the building, but would eventually encompass most of the upper-level of the building.
