= Whitehorn station =

Railway station in Alberta, Canada

Whitehorn
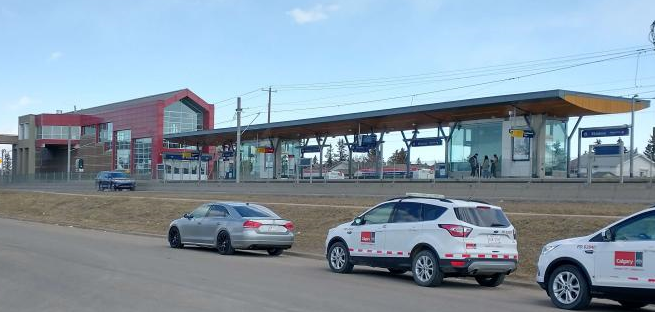

General information
- Location: 3801 - 36 Street NE
- Coordinates: 51°05′12″N 113°58′54″W
- Owner: Calgary Transit
- Line: Blue Line (202)
- Platforms: Center-loading platform
- Tracks: 2
- Connections: 38 North Crosstown; 43 36 Street East; 57 Monterey Park/McCall Way NE; 70 Temple; 555 Dashmesh Centre (Sundays only)

Construction
- Structure type: At-grade
- Parking: 824 spaces
- Accessible: yes

History
- Opened: 1985; 41 years ago
- Rebuilt: 2011; 15 years ago (major); 2024; 2 years ago (minor)

Services
Preceding station	Calgary Transit	Following station
Rundle toward 69 Street	Blue Line	McKnight–Westwinds toward Saddletowne
Location

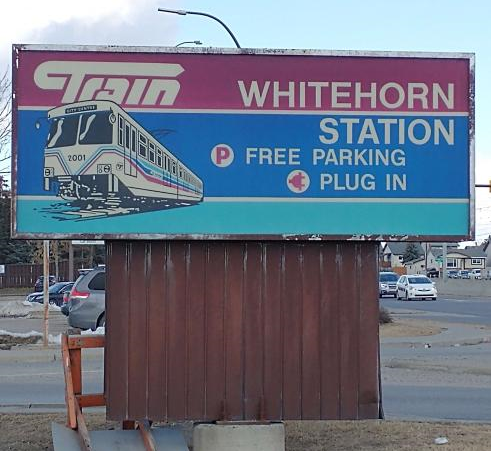
The sign located in the parking lot of Whitehorn Station

Whitehorn Station is a light rail station on the CTrain network of Calgary, Alberta, Canada. Located in the city's Northeast community of Whitehorn, the station serves the Northeast leg of the Blue Line. The station opened on April 27, 1985, as part of the original Route 202 (now called the Blue Line), and was the terminus of the line until a later extension to: McKnight-Westwinds, in December 2007.

The station is located in the median of 36 Street NE, immediately to the north of Whitehorn Drive. The station is 9.8 km from the City Hall Interlocking.

The station serves the community of Whitehorn and is adjacent to Horizon Industrial Park. 824 parking spaces are included at the station on the Horizon side of the station.

A small bus loop is located on the west side of the station, and was a major hub for bus routes connecting Calgary's far northeastern communities to the CTrain prior to the 2007 extension to McKnight-Westwinds. Currently only a handful of bus routes use the station; most of these routes are local, however major inter-city bus services connect to the station, providing bus connections to Airdrie, Edmonton and Red Deer.

Pedestrian overpasses connect the station to both sides of 36 Street NE. Stairs, escalators, as well as an elevator provide access down to the center-loading platform. As of 2011, a grade-level pedestrian train crossing to the south of the station provides direct access to the station and it's platform.

In 2007, the station registered an average ridership of 18,600 passengers per weekday.

== Station upgrades ==
It was announced in 2010 that along with the usual platform upgrades which upgraded stations from having platforms to accommodate for 4 platform trains at the time, that Whitehorn Station would receive multiple other renovations including: a new platform canopy with shelters, a new outdoor crossing on the south end of the station, relocation of the elevator, mechanical and electric upgrades. These upgrades would take place during the year of 2011, with the station being reopened with the new changes on October 17, 2011. The most notable of these changes was the new platform canopy, which is a feature that Whitehorn Station has that other stations in the Northeast do not have, including the very similarly designed Marlborough and Rundle Stations.

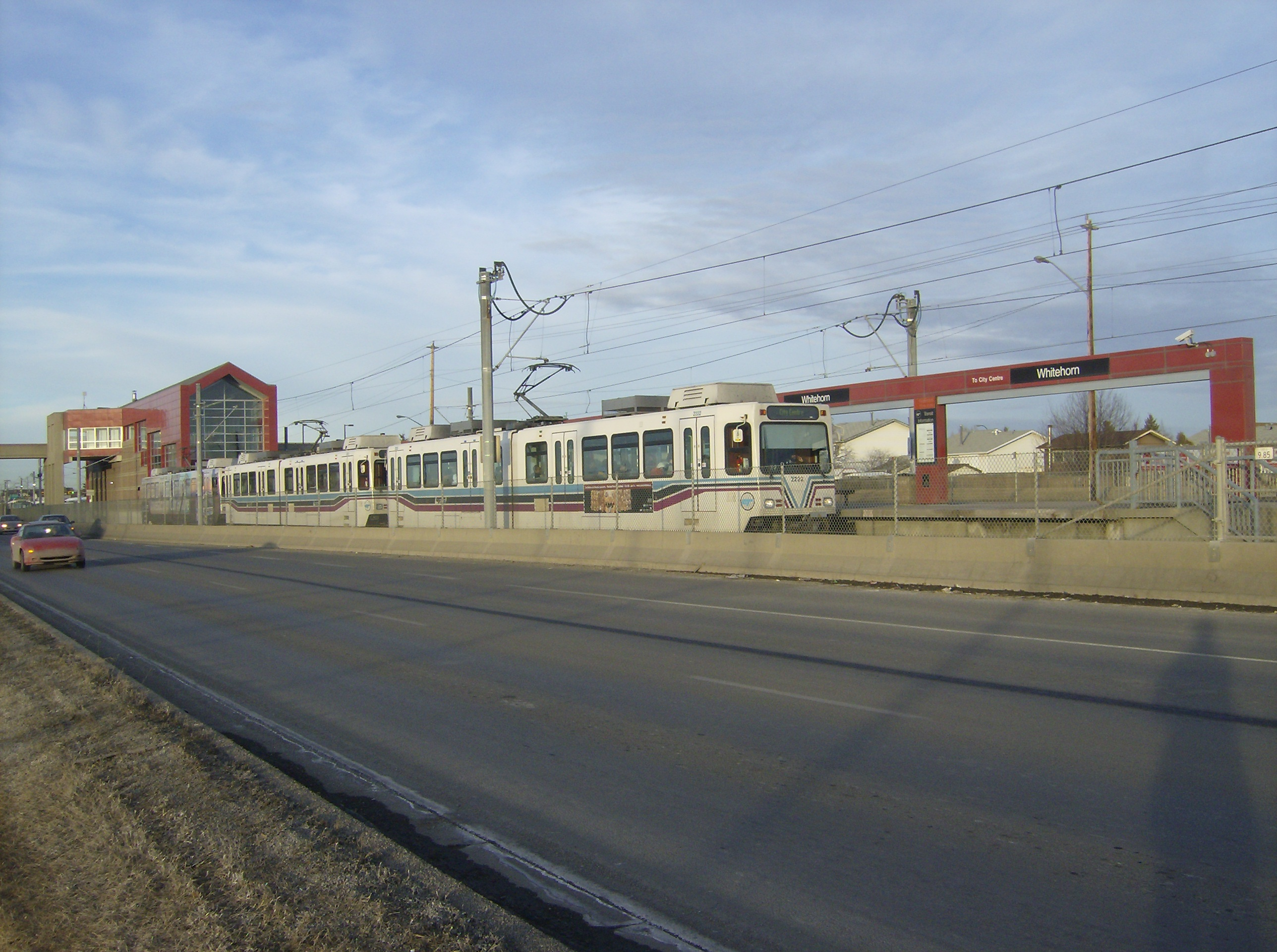
Whitehorn Station in 2007 before the platform canopy was added in 2011

Calgary Transit, in collaboration with Shaw Communications, announced on November 16, 2016 that 8 new locations for Public Wi-Fi services would be added to the Calgary C-Train system. These new locations would add public Wi-Fi to 18 new stations; including Whitehorn Station. These changes ere done as they would improve transit experience for their users, which would improve customer commitment.

== Around the station ==
=== Major destinations ===
- Horizon Heights (shopping plaza)
- Walmart Canada Distribution Centre
- Whitehorn Multi-Services Centre

=== Communities ===
Residential

- Rundle
- Whitehorn

Commercial

- Sunridge

Industrial

- Horizon

=== Educational institutions ===
Primary School

- Annie Gale Middle
- Chief Justice Milvain Elementary
- Colonel J. Fred Scott Elementary

=== Major streets ===
- 32 Avenue NE
- 36 Street NE
- 39 Avenue NE / Whitefield Drive
- 44 Avenue NE
- Whitehorn Drive

== Crime ==
During the month of March 2023, an underground drug operation along the Calgary C-Train system would get disrupted. Officers seized the substances of fentanyl, methamphetamine, cocaine, morphine, and Xanax. Multiple weapons such as 21 knives, two machetes, two hatchets, a handgun, and a can of bear spray were also seized by police. 40 people would get arrested between multiple stations, Whitehorn along with Franklin, Southland, Marlborough, Heritage, Sunalta, Rundle, Brentwood, Chinook, Crowfoot, 8th Street SW, Anderson, Dalhousie, Westbrook Stations would have arrests relating to the aforementioned drug trade.

== Transit connections ==
Bus connections to Whithorn station as of 31 August, 2026:

=== Calgary Transit ===
- 38 - North Crosstown Brentwood (West) / 38 - North Crosstown Saddletowne (East)
- 43 - 36 Street East Chinook (South)
- 57 - Monterey Park (East) / 57 - McCall Way NE (West)
- 70 - Temple/Saddletowne (North)
- 555 - Dashmesh Centre (Sundays service only)

=== RiderExpress ===
- Calgary - Red Deer - Edmonton

== See also ==
- CTrain
- Blue Line (Calgary)
- Marlborough station
- McKnight–Westwinds station
- Rundle station
- Whitehorn, Calgary
