= Franklin station (Calgary) =

Light rail station in Calgary, Alberta, Canada

Franklin
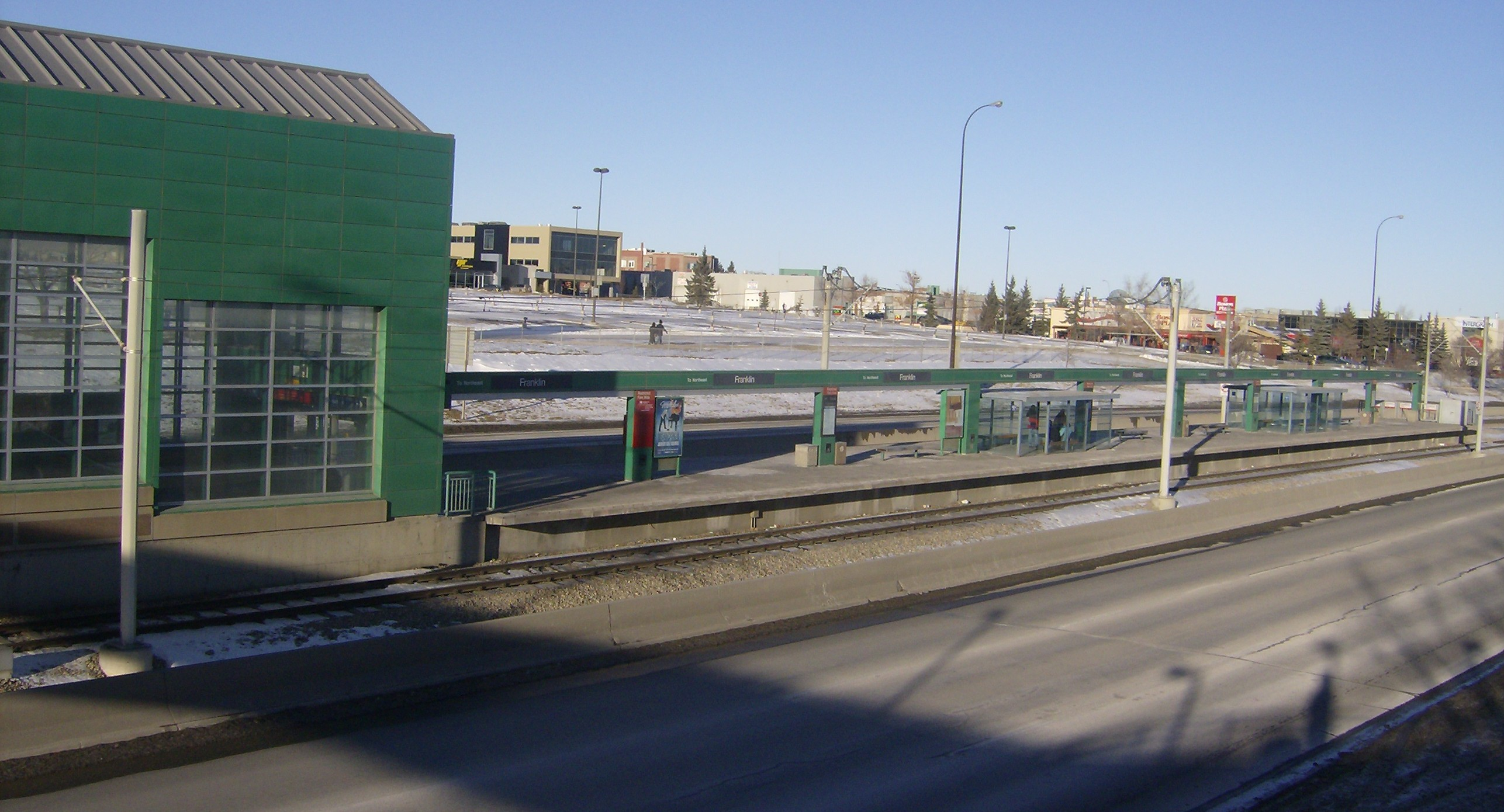

General information
- Location: 2826 Memorial Drive SE
- Coordinates: 51°02′50″N 113°59′40″W
- Owner: Calgary Transit
- Platforms: Center-loading platform
- Connections: 155 West Dover/Forest Lawn; 440 Chateau Estates

Construction
- Structure type: At-grade
- Parking: 578 spaces
- Accessible: yes

History
- Opened: 1985; 41 years ago
- Rebuilt: 2013; 13 years ago

Services
Preceding station	Calgary Transit	Following station
Barlow/Max Bell toward 69 Street	Blue Line	Marlborough toward Saddletowne
Location

Franklin Station is a Calgary C-Train light rail station in Calgary, Alberta, Canada. It serves the Northeast Line (Route 202) and opened on April 27, 1985, as part of the original route. It is located in the Southeast quadrant of Calgary.

The station is located in the median of Memorial Drive, just west of the intersection with 28 Street SE. The station is 4.7 km (2.92 mi) from the City Hall Interlocking. Pedestrian bridges connect the station to either side of Memorial Drive. Stairs, escalators, as well as an elevator provide access down to the center-loading platform. The station serves the community Radisson Heights-Albert Park to the south and industrial areas to the north. 578 parking spaces are available for commuters.

In 2005, the station registered an average transit of 4,700 boardings per weekday.

== Station upgrades ==
As part of Calgary Transit's plan to operate 4-car trains by the end of 2014, all 3-car platforms were extended. In addition to a platform extension, Franklin Station also had new furnishings installed. Construction was completed in the late Summer/Fall of 2013. As a result of the change from 3 to 4 car platforms; Franklin, along with every other station between Bridgeland-Memorial and Whitehorn, would have the furnishings on the platforms greatly changed. The old platforms featured a bar coming out from the structure through the middle of the platform; whilst the new platforms contain the name of the station with two light posts aiming away from the name, with glass shelters in between these structures.

New vs Old East Platforms

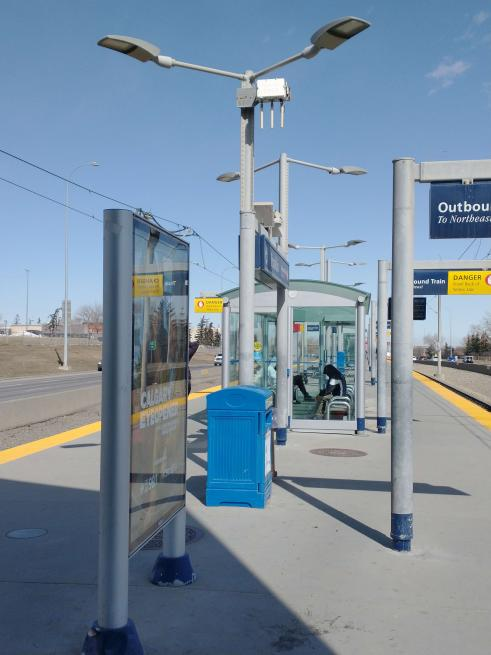
Franklin Station 2023

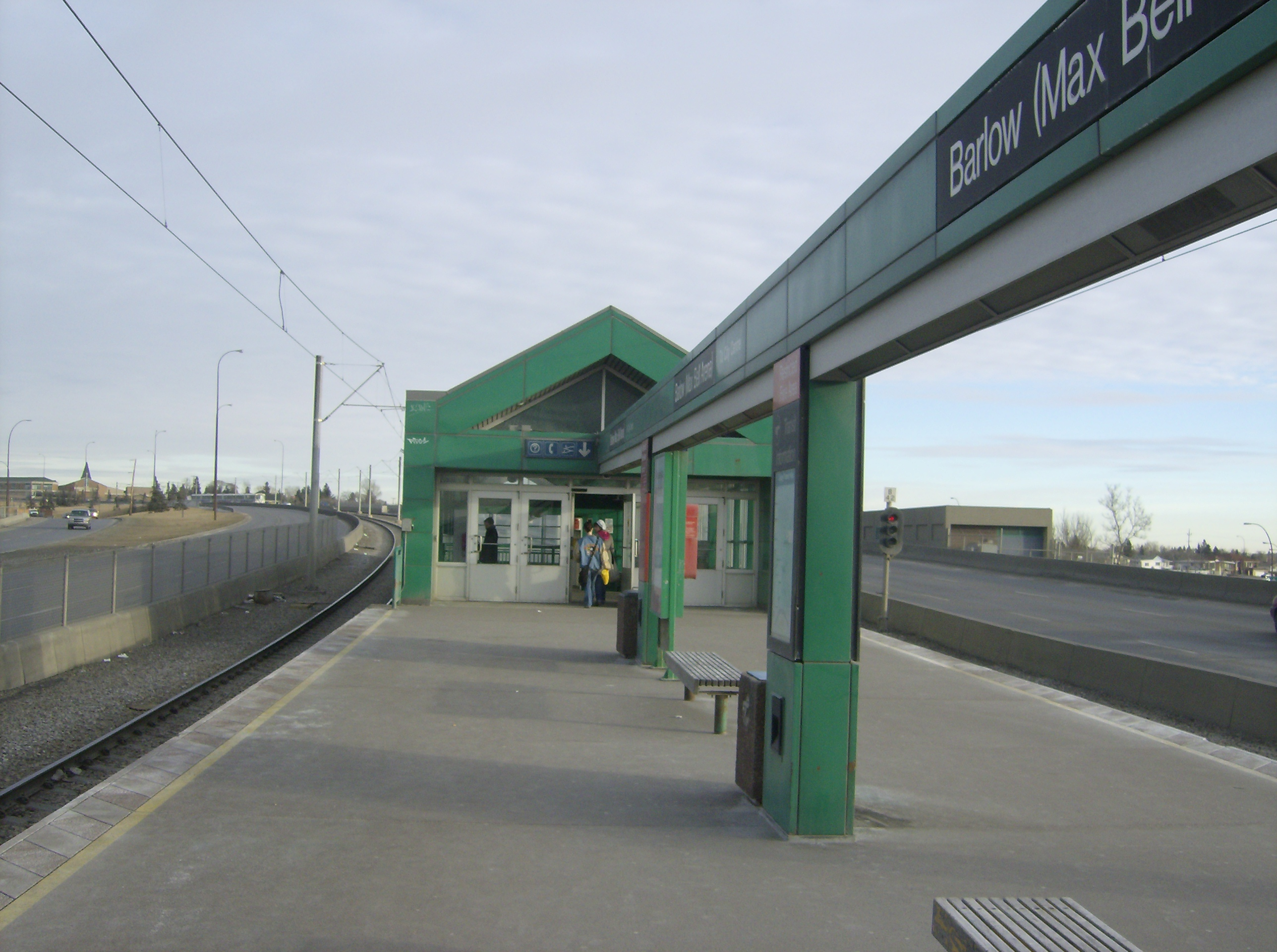
Barlow-Max Bell Station 2007

Calgary Transit, in collaboration with Shaw Communications, announced on November 16, 2016 that 8 new locations for Public Wi-Fi services would be added to the Calgary C-Train system. These new locations would add public Wi-Fi to 18 new stations; including Franklin Station. These changes ere done as they would improve transit experience for their users, which would improve customer commitment.

== Transit connections ==
Bus connections to Franklin Station as of 31 August, 2026:

- 155 - Forest Lawn / 155 - West Dover
- 440 - Chateau Estates/East Hills

== Crime ==
Albert Park/Radisson Heights - the community the station is located in - is one of the worst neighborhoods along the Calgary C-Train network. The community was measured to have a 2023 crime rate of 5,503/100k. This is lower than some of the Southern Red Line neighborhoods which lead the city for crime.

During the month of March 2023, an underground drug operation along the Calgary C-Train system would get disrupted. Officers seized the substances of fentanyl, methamphetamine, cocaine, morphine, and Xanax. Multiple weapons such as 21 knives, two machetes, two hatchets, a handgun, and a can of bear spray were also seized by police. 40 people would get arrested between multiple stations, Franklin along with Southland, Marlborough, Heritage, Sunalta, Rundle, Whitehorn, Brentwood, Chinook, Crowfoot, 8th Street SW, Anderson, Dalhousie, Westbrook Stations would have arrests relating to the aforementioned drug trade.

Shortly after 3:30 PM on January 19, 2011, a man in his early 20s was walking with his female friend at the Franklin LRT Station. The two were approached by 3 men and a confrontation occurred at the top of the spiral stairs outside the station, and the men started punching the young man. The victim and his friend started fleeing, but the male escaped with a stabbing by an unknown object.

At approximately 10 PM on August 28, 2012, a 31-year-old female victim was walking right outside the Franklin LRT Station, when she heard someone yelling at her from a nearby vehicle. The woman was startled and began walking to the nearby Franklin LRT Station, as the victim was about to enter the station, the suspect ran up behind her. The man engaged in conversation with the victim, and then quickly began to grab at the woman and pull her towards him.

At roughly 12:15 AM on Wednesday July 22, 2015, two men were taken to hospital from the Franklin LRT Station with non-life-threatening injuries from a stabbing attack.

At about 2:45 PM on Tuesday April 5, 2022, police were called to Franklin LRT Station after a stabbing had taken place on the C-Train platform. One person was taken to hospital and the other was arrested later in Downtown.

At the Franklin LRT Station at roughly 2:40 PM on November 11, 2022, two men feeling uncomfortable waited outside for their trains. When two men approached them and punched one of the men in the jaw. Police say that this attack was hate motivated with homophobia in question.
