= Sleepy Hollow High =

Sleepy Hollow High may refer to:

== Schools ==
- Sleepy Hollow High School (Canada)
- Sleepy Hollow High School (New York)
