= Hawkwood, Calgary =

Hawkwood
- Community
- Location of Hawkwood in Calgary
- Coordinates: 51°07′54″N 114°10′40″W
- Country: Canada
- Province: Alberta
- City: Calgary
- Quadrant: NW
- Ward: 2
- Established: 1981

Government
  - Mayor: Jeromy Farkas
  - Administrative body: Calgary City Council
  - Councillor: Jennifer Wyness (Independent)

Area
  - Total: 3.2 km^{2} (1.2 sq mi)
- Elevation: 1,230 m (4,040 ft)

Population (2006)
  - Total: 10,559
  - Average Income: $86,912
- Website: Hawkwood Community Association

Hawkwood is a residential neighbourhood in the northwest quadrant of Calgary, Alberta, Canada. It is bounded to the north by Country Hills Boulevard, to the east by Sarcee Trail, to the south by John Laurie Boulevard, and to the west by Nose Hill Drive.

Hawkwood was established in 1981. It was named for a dairy farming family who came to Alberta from England in 1913. It is represented in the Calgary City Council by the Ward 2 councillor.

== Demographics ==
In the City of Calgary's 2012 municipal census, Hawkwood had a population of 9,831 living in 3,331 dwellings, a -0.7% increase from its 2011 population of 9,898. With a land area of 3.2 km^{2} (1.2 sq mi), it had a population density of 3,070/km^{2} (7,960/sq mi) in 2012.

Residents in this community had a median household income of $96,806 in 2005, and there were 9.1% low income residents living in the neighbourhood. As of 2000, 29.6% of the residents were immigrants. A proportion of 4.1% of the buildings were condominiums or apartments, and 5.5% of the housing was used for renting.

== Education ==
The community is served by Hawkwood Elementary School (public school) and by St. Maria Goretti Elementary (Catholic). Students in the public system would then continue on to F.E. Osborne Junior High School and then on to Sir Winston Churchill High School, and beginning in September 2013, Robert Thirsk High School. Catholic system students go on to St. Jean Brebeuf Junior High School, and to St. Francis High School.

== See also ==
- List of neighbourhoods in Calgary
