= Southland station (Calgary) =

Light rail station in Calgary, Alberta, Canada

Southland
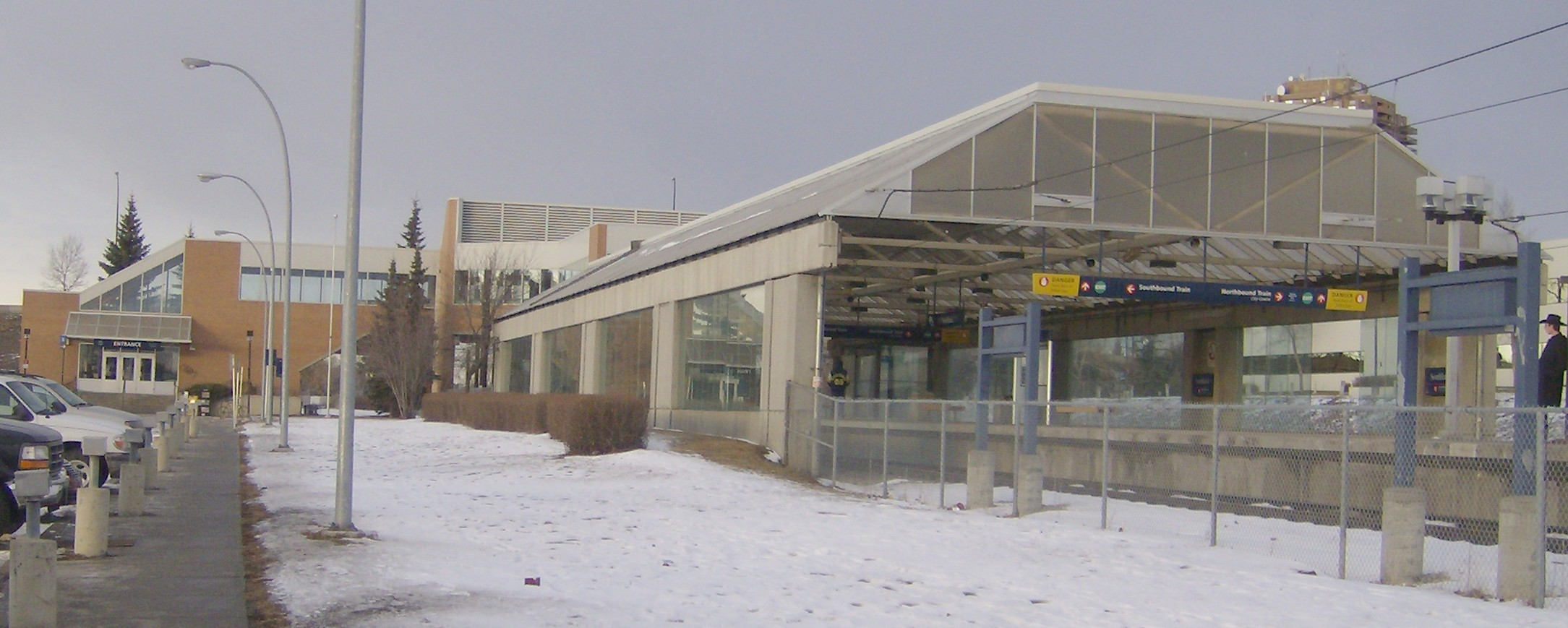

General information
- Location: 10158 Sacramento Drive SW
- Coordinates: 50°57′51″N 114°04′36″W
- Transit authority: Calgary Transit
- Platforms: Center-loading platform
- Connections: 15 Deerfoot Meadows; 81 Kingsland; 99 Acadia/Oakridge; 125 Cedarbrae; 126 Braeside

Construction
- Structure type: At-grade
- Parking: 650 spaces
- Accessible: yes

History
- Opened: 1981; 45 years ago
- Rebuilt: 2011; 15 years ago (minor)

Services
Preceding station	Calgary Transit	Following station
Heritage toward Tuscany	Red Line	Anderson toward Somerset–Bridlewood
Location

Southland Station is a Calgary C-Train light rail station in Southwood, Calgary, Alberta. It serves the South Line (Route 201) and opened on May 25, 1981, as part of the original line. The station is located on the exclusive LRT right of way (adjacent to CPR ROW), 9.5 km (5.9 mi) south of the City Hall interlocking at Southland Drive.

The station is located in the far northeast of the Southwood community, along the border with Haysboro and Acadia. The station is located directly south of Southland Drive SW—where the station gets its name; and roughly 350 metres west of Macleod Trail.

The station consists of a center-loading platform with mezzanine access on the North end and grade-level access at the South end. 650 spaces are available for parking at the station.

In 2005, the station registered an average transit of 10,500 boardings per weekday.

On July 12, 2016, a flash flood occurred at Southland Park and Ride. This flash flood flooded with high water marks on some cars above the headlights of the cars causing water ingress into engines and car interiors.

== S Block ==
Southland Block or also known as S Block is the area of Southwood that Southland Station is a part of. Southland Block includes Southland Park, the Southland Drive Bridge, and Haddon Road Park. It is famous in local youth culture for the large amounts of graffiti in it, and the large amount of homelessness in and around it.

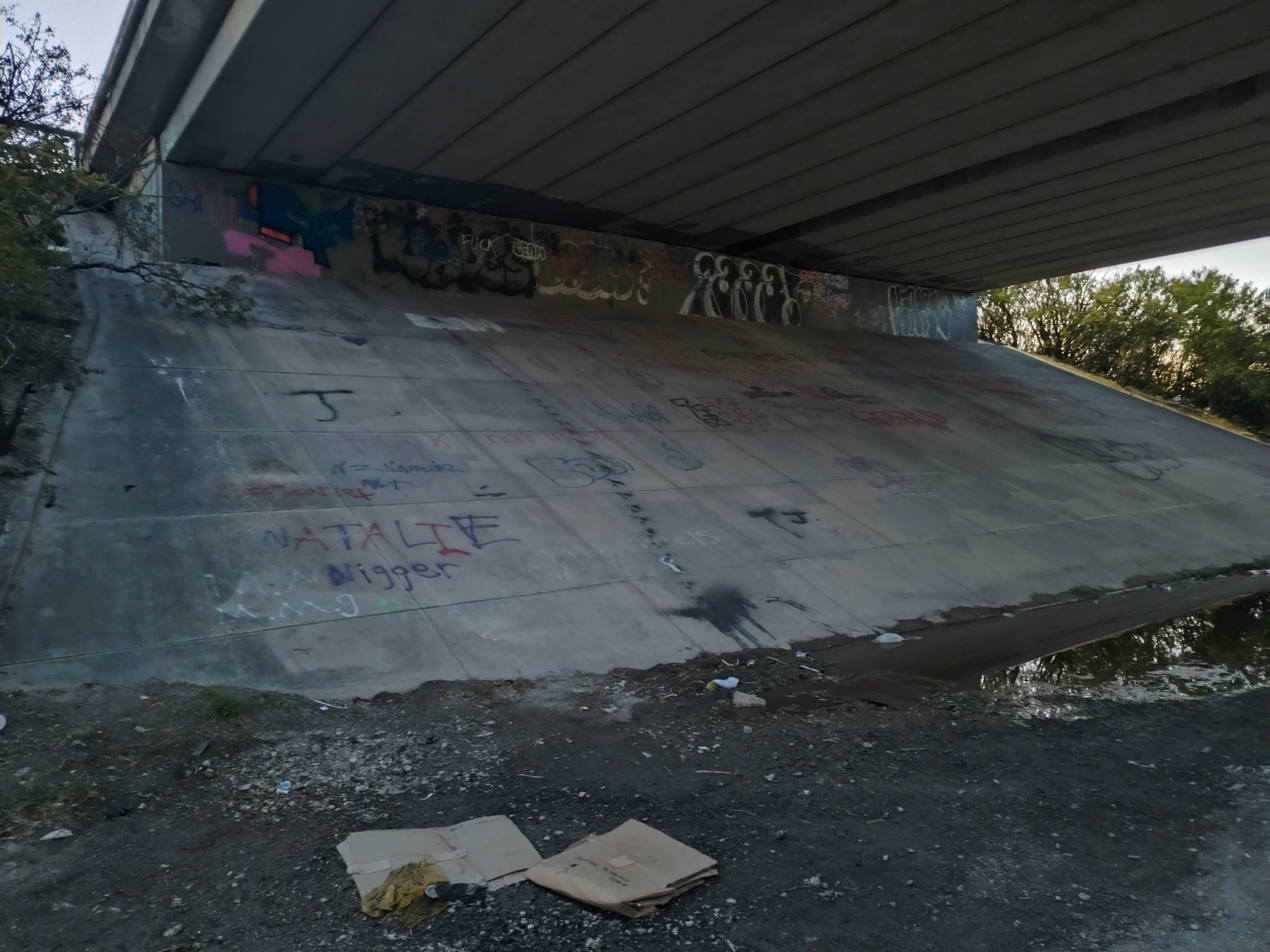
The Southland Drive Bridge a part of 'S Block'

== Upgrades ==
The station was originally accessible only from the West side of the tracks; accessing the Southland Business Center required a long walk north to Southland Drive, along Southland Drive over the tracks, and South again on the other side. In November 2009, a pedestrian overpass was added to the Southland Park business centre, which allows for much quicker access to the business park.

Southland station was originally built to accommodate the three-car trains in use at the time of construction. On February 3, 2011, construction was begun to renovate the platform to accommodate 4-car trains. On March 19, 2011, service at the platform was halted until May 6 to facilitate the construction of the upgrade.

The upgrade was completed in late August 2011.

== Crime ==
Southwood - the community the station is located in - is one of the worst communities along the Calgary CTrain network for crime. Southwood was measured to have a 2023 crime rate of 6,136/100k, making it worse than communities such as Forest Lawn or Marlborough.

Southland Station has been criticized for being a crime hotspot along the Calgary C-Train System. On a CityNews interview in January 2022 with Calgary Transit Lead Staff 'Stephen Tauro', it was listed as one of the 5 stations with an unusually high crime rate. The others beig: Marlborough, Rundle, Heritage and Sunalta Stations.

During the month of March 2023, an underground drug operation along the Calgary C-Train system would get disrupted. Officers seized the substances of fentanyl, methamphetamine, cocaine, morphine, and Xanax. Multiple weapons such as 21 knives, two machetes, two hatchets, a handgun, and a can of bear spray were also seized by police. 40 people would get arrested between multiple stations, Southland along with Franklin, Marlborough, Heritage, Sunalta, Rundle, Whitehorn, Brentwood, Chinook, Crowfoot, 8th Street SW, Anderson, Dalhousie, Westbrook Stations would have arrests relating to the aforementioned drug trade.

A victim, 27, was attacked at about 1:30 AM on the morning of November 10, 2006 as he descended the escalators at Southland LRT Station. The victim was surrounded by five young adults, with one person assaulting the man as the others watched.

An hour after a stabbing took place at 4th Street LRT Station on the night of January 10, 2022, another unrelated stabbing took place at Southland Station.

== Transit connections ==
Bus connections to Southland station as of 31 August, 2026:

- 15 - City Centre (North)
- 81 - Kingsland (North)
- 99 - Acadia (East) / 99 - Oakridge (West)
- 125 - Cedarbrae (Counterclockwise)
- 126 - Braeside (Clockwise)

== See also ==
- CTrain
- Red Line (Calgary)
- Anderson station (Calgary)
- Chinook station
- Heritage station (Calgary)
- Southwood, Calgary
