= Citadel, Calgary =

Citadel
- Neighbourhood
- Location of Citadel in Calgary
- Coordinates: 51°08′28″N 114°10′24″W
- Country: Canada
- Province: Alberta
- City: Calgary
- Quarant: NW
- Ward: 2
- Established: 1993
- Annexed: 1983

Government
  - Mayor: Jeromy Farkas
  - Administrative body: Calgary City Council
  - Councillor: Jennifer Wyness (Independent)
- Elevation: 1,255 m (4,117 ft)

Population (2016)
  - Total: 10,435
  - Average Income: $116,851
- Website: Citadel Community Association

Citadel is a community in Northwest Calgary, Alberta. It is bordered by Stoney Trail on the north and west, Country Hills Blvd on the south, and Sarcee Trail on the east.

Public transportation in Citadel is provided by Calgary Transit bus route 138 to Crowfoot C-Train Station.

== Demographics ==
In the City of Calgary's 2016 municipal census, Citadel had a population of 10,435 living in 3,485 dwellings, a 0.3% increase from its 2011 population of 10,171. With a land area of 2.7 km^{2} (1.0 sq mi), it had a population density of 3,860/km^{2} (10,010/sq mi) in 2016.

Residents in this community had a median household income of $116,851 in 2016, and there were 7% low income residents living in the neighbourhood. The neighbourhood is represented in the Calgary City Council by the Ward 2 councillor.

The most common languages spoken by residents include English, Mandarin, Cantonese, Spanish, Arabic, and Punjabi.

== Education ==
This neighbourhood is served by 3 public schools. Citadel Park Elementary (K-4) and Arbour Lake School (5-9) are operated by the Calgary Board of Education. St. Brigid Catholic School offers elementary to junior high and is operated by the Calgary Catholic School District.
