= Royal Oak, Calgary =

Royal Oak
- Neighbourhood
- Location of Royal Oak in Calgary
- Coordinates: 51°08′36″N 114°13′25″W
- Country: Canada
- Province: Alberta
- City: Calgary
- Quadrant: NW
- Ward: 2
- Established: 1997
- Annexed: 1989

Government
  - Mayor: Jeromy Farkas
  - Administrative body: Calgary City Council
  - Councillor: Jennifer Wyness (Independent)

Area
  - Total: 5.7 km^{2} (2.2 sq mi)
- Elevation: 1,278 m (4,193 ft)

Population (2014)
  - Total: 11,650
  - Average Income: $110,906
- Website: Royal Oak Community Association

Royal Oak is a residential neighbourhood in the northwest quadrant of Calgary, Alberta. It is located close to the northwestern edge of the city and is bounded to the north by Country Hills Boulevard, to the east by Stoney Trail, to the south by Crowchild Trail and to the west by Rocky Ridge Road. Royal Oak is located near Rocky Ridge, Calgary.

The land was annexed to the City of Calgary in 1989 (from the Municipal District of Rocky View), and Royal Oak was established in 1997. It is represented in the Calgary City Council by the Ward 1 councillor.

== Demographics ==
In the City of Calgary's 2014 municipal census, Royal Oak had a population of 11,650 living in 4,011 dwellings, a 6.1% increase from its 2011 population of 10,979. With a land area of 3.6 km^{2} (1.4 sq mi), it had a population density of 3,130/km^{2} (8,100/sq mi) in 2012.

Residents in this community had a median household income of $110,906 in 2010, and there were no low income residents living in the neighborhood.

== See also ==
- List of neighbourhoods in Calgary
