= All Saints High School (Calgary) =

Location
- 729 Legacy Village Road SE; Calgary, Alberta, T2X 4K9; Canada; 50.859375°N 114.026510°W

Information
- School type: High School
- Religious affiliation: Roman Catholic
- Founded: 2018
- School board: Calgary Catholic School District
- Principal: Peter Rybicki
- Grades: 10-12
- Language: English
- Colours: Blue and Gold
- Team name: Legends
- Website: allsaints.cssd.ab.ca

All Saints High School is a Roman Catholic high school located in Calgary, Alberta operated under the jurisdiction of the Calgary Catholic School District. The school's designated boundaries include the deep south communities of Calgary like Auburn Bay, Belmont, Chaparral, Cranston, Legacy, Mahogany, Seton, Silverado, Walden, Wolf Willow, and Yorkville.

== History ==
The name of the school was chosen by the naming committee which consisted of trustee Mary Martin, Superintendent of Instructional Services Andrea Holowka, Superintendent of Area A Schools Mike Ross, Deacon Vivian Pinto (St. Patrick parish), Father Julian Studden and Father Anthony Poul (St. Albert the Great parish), parent representatives from six school councils and the principal Mike Bolder.
