= James Fowler High School =

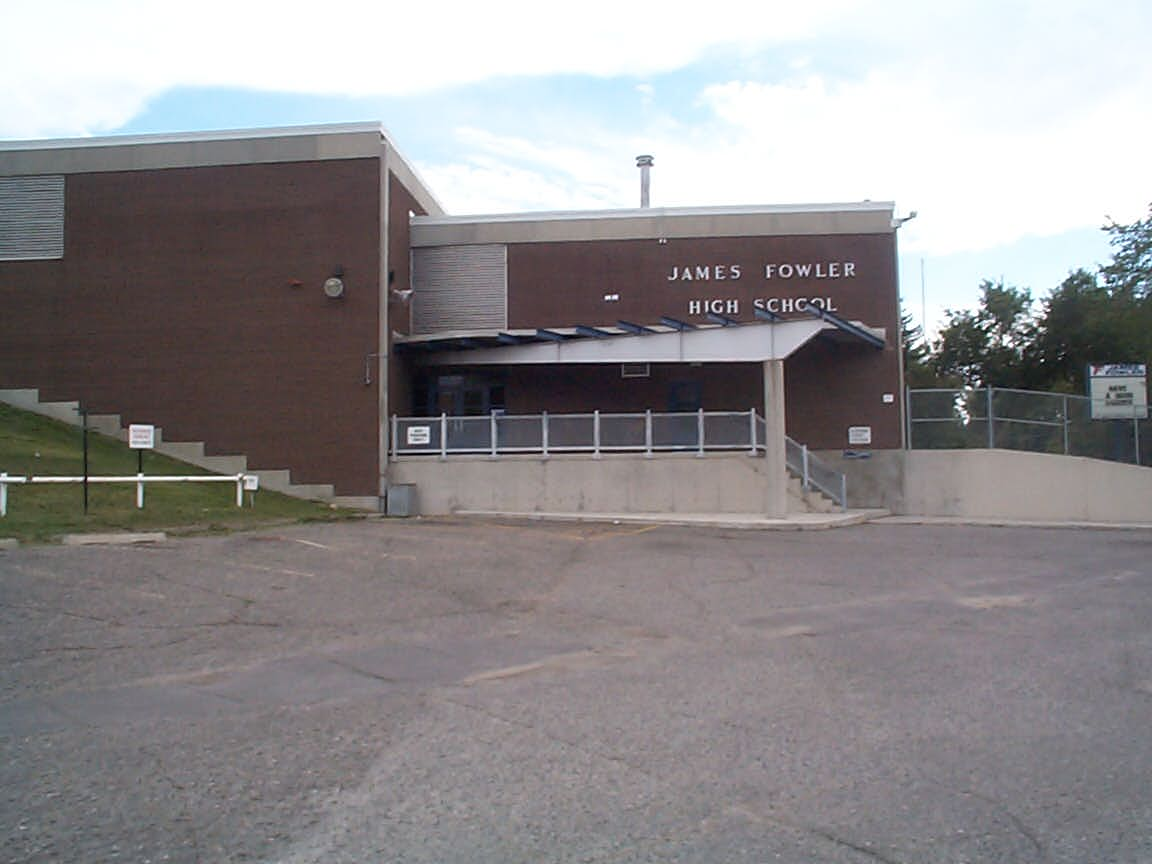
- The main side entrance to the school, showing the name of the school.

Location
- 4004 - 4 Street N.W. Calgary, Alberta, T3K 1E7; Canada; 51°05′12″N 114°04′10″W

Information
- School type: High School
- Motto: A great place to learn.
- Founded: 1962
- Status: Open
- School board: Calgary Board of Education
- Grades: 10-12
- Enrollment: Approximately 1468 (2023)
- Mascot: Falcon
- Team name: Fowler Falcons
- Website: school.cbe.ab.ca/school/jamesfowler

James Fowler High School is a senior high school in Calgary, Alberta, Canada, in the neighborhood of Highland Park. The school is part of the Calgary Board of Education's public school system, and currently has approximately 1627 students attending the school as of September 2024.

== About the school ==
James Fowler High School was built in 1962 and covers an area of about 13.34 acres of land. The school offers the regular program for grades 10–12 as well as the Advanced Placement (AP) Program. The school also offers both a K&E (Knowledge and Employability) program and a PLP (Paced Learning) program as well.

== Curriculum ==
James Fowler High School has many different courses that students can participate in while going to James Fowler High School, such as Robotics, Foods, Computer Science, Music, Art, and various other courses. The regular, core classes offered in most schools such as English, Social Studies, Science, Mathematics, Physical Education, and various others are also offered. There are also various clubs that students can take part in before, during, and after school hours.
