= Bowness High School =

Location
- 4627 77 St NW; Calgary, Alberta, T3B 2N6; Canada; 51.093345°N 114.199893°W

Information
- School type: Public
- Motto: Once a Trojan, always a Trojan
- Founded: 1956
- School board: Calgary Board of Education
- Superintendent: Christopher Usih
- Principal: Jana Macdonald
- Grades: 10-12 regular program
- Enrollment: 1218 (2021)
  - Grade 10: 402
  - Grade 11: 413
  - Grade 12: 403
- Area: Area I, Ward 1
- Colours: Green and Gold
- Mascot: Tommy the Trojan
- Team name: Trojans
- Communities served: Bowness, Crestmont, Greenwood, Montgomery, Silver Springs, Tuscany, Valley Ridge, Cougar Ridge, Patterson, Coach Hill
- Feeder schools: Twelve Mile Coulee Middle School, Thomas B. Riley Junior High, F.E. Osborne Junior High, Vincent Massey Junior High, and West Ridge School

Bowness High School is a public school in Calgary, Alberta, Canada, which teaches grades 10 through 12. It is operated by the Calgary Board of Education.

The school was founded in 1956 as a junior and senior high school to serve the town of Bowness . In 1964 the town was annexed by Calgary. No longer having a junior high component, the school now serves several Calgary communities in addition to Bowness.

In 2016 Bowness opened its newly constructed southern wing of the school.

== Notable alumni ==
- Nick Blevins - Rugby player - Team Canada
- Devan Dubnyk - NHL Goalie - Edmonton Oilers, Nashville Predators
- Amanda Forbis - Film maker
- Ryan Sceviour - Professional football player - Calgary Stampeders
- Patti Stiles (née Atfield) - Actress known for her work in improvisation.
