= Sandstone Valley, Calgary =

Sandstone Valley
- Neighbourhood
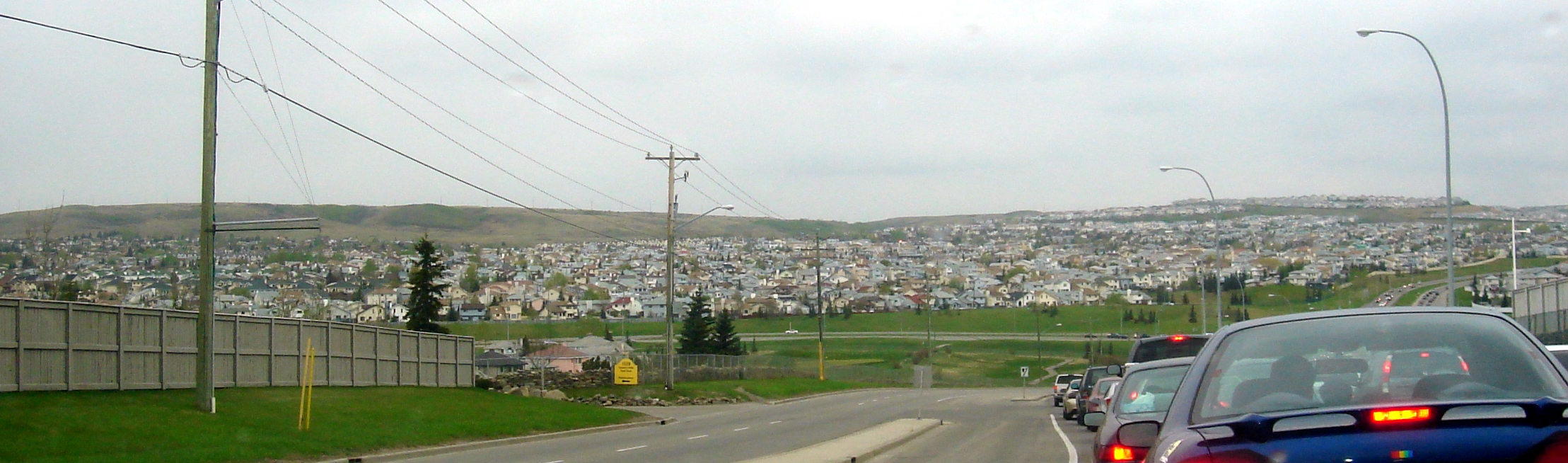
- Sandstone Valley and Nose Hill Park

- Location of Sandstone Valley in Calgary
- Coordinates: 51°08′22″N 114°05′48″W
- Country: Canada
- Province: Alberta
- City: Calgary
- Quadrant: NW
- Ward: 4
- Established: 1982

Government
  - Mayor: Jeromy Farkas
  - Administrative body: Calgary City Council
  - Councillor: DJ Kelly (The Calgary Party)

Area
  - Total: 1.8 km^{2} (0.69 sq mi)
- Elevation: 1,130 m (3,710 ft)

Population (2006)
  - Total: 6,628
  - Average Income: $75,002
- Website: Sandstone Valley Community Association

Sandstone Valley is a suburban neighbourhood in northwest Calgary, Alberta, Canada. Located northwest of the community of Beddington Heights, this primarily low-density residential community is bounded by Country Hills Boulevard to the north, Beddington Trail to the east, Berkshire Boulevard to the south and 14th Street W to the west. The Nose Hill Park is located southwest from the community.

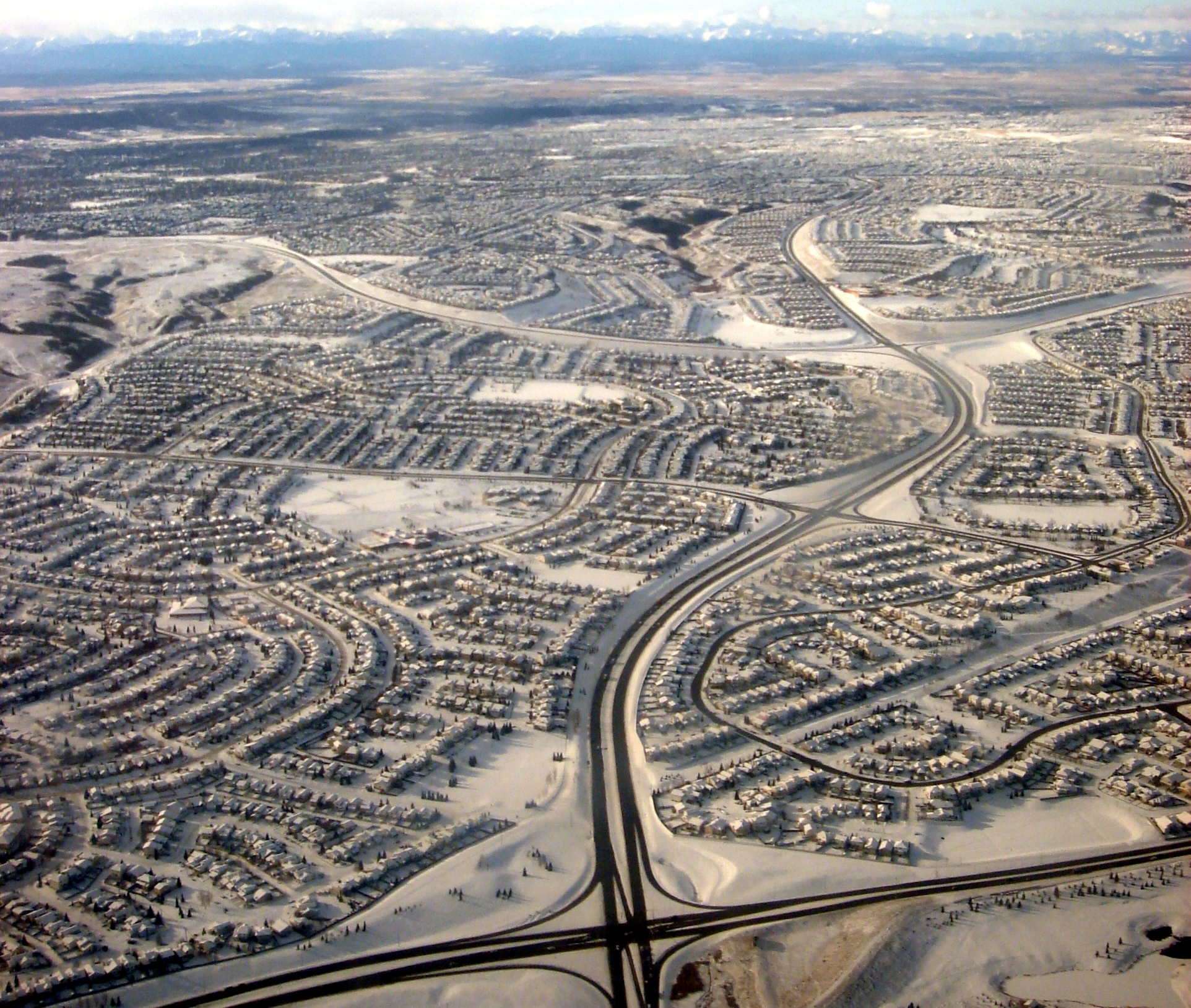
Aerial view of Sandstone Valley in winter

It is represented in the Calgary City Council by the Ward 4 councillor.

Development of this community began in 1982, and was recently completed.

== Demographics ==
In the City of Calgary's 2012 municipal census, Sandstone Valley had a population of 6,253 living in 2,120 dwellings, a 1.8% increase from its 2011 population of 6,142. With a land area of 1.8 km^{2} (0.69 sq mi), it had a population density of 3,470/km^{2} (9,000/sq mi) in 2012.

Residents in this community had a median household income of $75,002 in 2000, and there were 13% low income residents living in the neighbourhood. As of 2000, 36.2% of the residents were immigrants. A proportion of 1% of the buildings were condominiums or apartments, and 8.6% of the housing was used for renting.

== Education ==
In 2006, there were two schools in the district:

- Monsignor N. Anderson Elementary - Separate
- Simons Valley Elementary School - Public

== See also ==
- List of neighbourhoods in Calgary
