= Saint Francis High School (Calgary) =

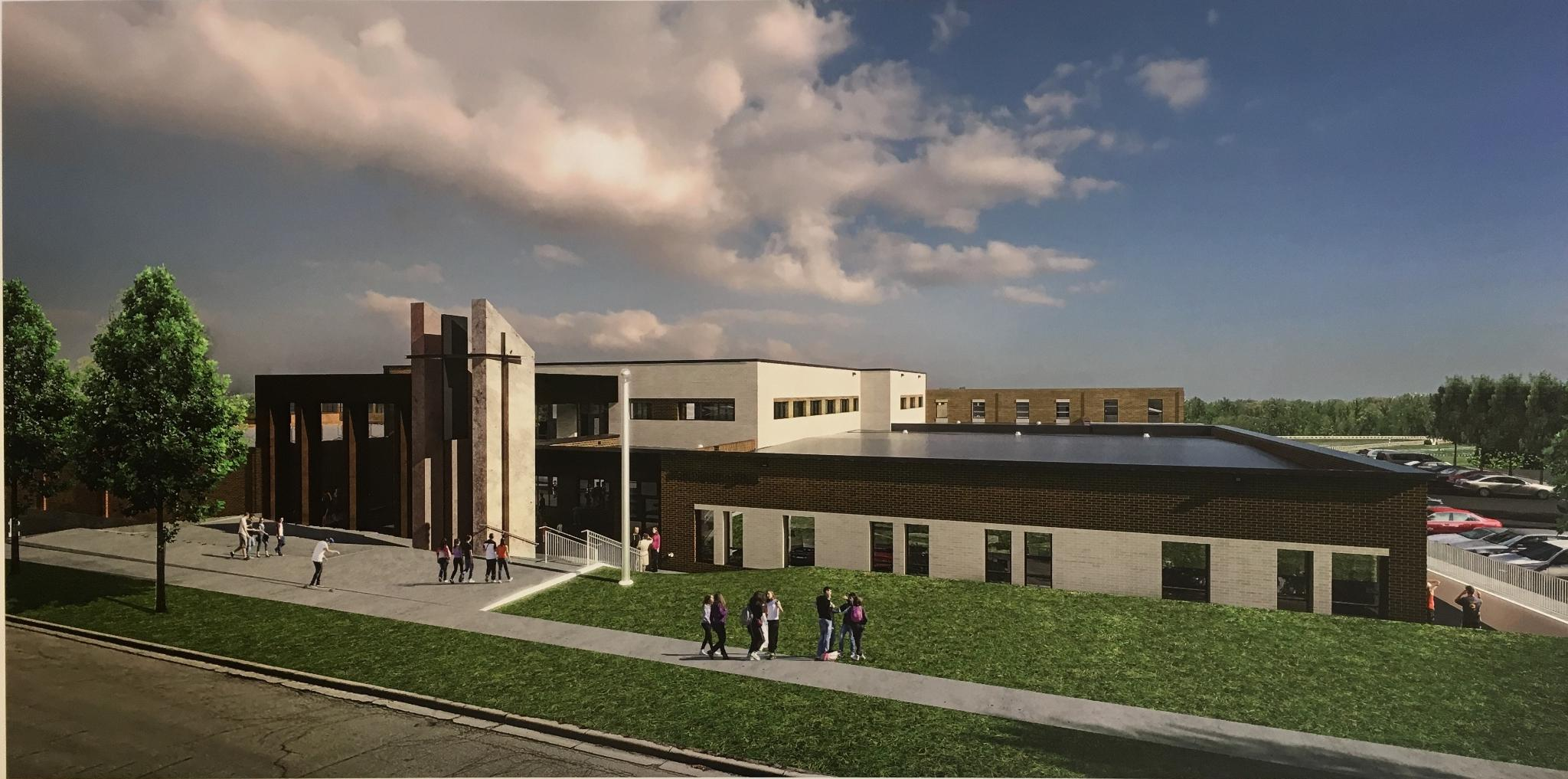

Location
- 877 Northmount Drive NW; Calgary, Alberta, T2L 0A3; Canada; 51.08538°N 114.101279°W

Information
- Other name: Saint Francis of Assisi Senior High School
- School type: High School
- Motto: pax et caritas (Peace and Love)
- Religious affiliation: Roman Catholic
- Patron saint: Saint Francis of Assisi
- Opened: September 1, 1962
- School board: Calgary Catholic School District
- Superintendent: B. Szumlas
- Principal: L. Fortini
- Secondary: 10-12
- Enrollment: 3200
- Language: English, Extended French, International Spanish Academy
- Colours: Brown, Copper (orange), White
- Mascot: Bear named "Sicnarf"
- Team name: Browns
- Website: stfrancis.cssd.ab.ca
- Last updated: May 14, 2024

Saint Francis High School is a Roman Catholic high school, and one of the largest in Calgary, serving 2006 students in the communities of northwest Calgary, Alberta.

== History ==
The school opened in 1962 with an enrollment of 466 students in three grades (9–11) and offered academic, commercial (business) and technical programs. By 1965 enrollment doubled and the vocational wings were constructed including shop areas for automotive, carpentry, electronics & electricity, drafting, commercial art, beauty culture, hot metals and lithograph. Two science labs, one multi-activity area and eight classrooms completed the addition. In 1983, two of the areas were renovated to house the Home Economics facilities and in 2000, a new library, media environment and music room were added along with new computer and science labs and numerous classrooms. In July 2017 modernization construction began on the school on the original section of the building, providing a new chapel, Culinary Arts area, expanded gymnasium facilities and a brighter, more open student commons.

The school's patron saint is Saint Francis of Assisi.

== Athletics ==
Saint Francis competes and participates as a Division I member school in the Calgary Senior High School Athletic Association (student body populous 1700+) and the Alberta Schools Athletic Association. Its sports programs have amassed several city and provincial championships. Its football program, has won thirty eight city titles (twenty four Senior Varsity Division I & fourteen Junior Varsity Division I), and seven Alberta Schools Athletic Association Senior Varsity Tier I Provincial titles (school population 1250+).

In addition, the school hosts two mid-winter basketball tournaments. The St Francis Invitational (SFI) is an eight team tournament that invites several senior boys varsity teams from rival city & provincial high schools, as well as schools from Western Canada and occasionally from the United States (specifically Laredo, Texas) to compete in a two-day tournament. SFI is a large part of the schools culture and helps bring the community together to celebrate basketball. The Browns' Invitational Tournament is an eight team tournament that hosts feeder schools from the Calgary Catholic junior high school system which is held weeks after the SFI.

== Academics ==
=== Music program ===
St. Francis High School comprises over 100 students in the various grades of 10,11,12. It contains a Concert choir and band, with Jazz options for both. The music programs have visited many places nationally and internationally to perform. All music programs have also received various awards for their performances and shows.

=== Drama program ===
St. Francis High School offers classes in Drama, Advanced Acting, Musical Theatre, Technical Theatre, and Dance. Students in these programs are entered into competition and festivals, and the program stages a fall production, spring production, musical theatre revue, and dance show, culminating in an evening gala featuring dance, choir, band, theatre, and visual art exhibitions and performances.

== Career and technology studies ==
St. Francis offers a comprehensive selection of course in Business, Practical and Technical Arts.

== Notable alumni ==
- Michelle Conn - Former Field Hockey Player
- Mike Cvik - NHL Linesmen
- John Forzani - Former CFL Player, chairman and co-founder of the FGL Sports
- Tom Forzani - Former CFL Player
- Javier Glatt - Former CFL Linebacker
- Alex Hicks - Former NHL Forward
- Rolly Lumbala - Former CFL Fullback
- Marco Iannuzzi - BC Lions Player
- Brian Pockar - Former Figure Skater
- Bruce Robertson - Former Rower & Olympic Champion
- Anita Vandenbeld - Canadian Member of Parliament
