= Scenic Acres, Calgary =

Scenic Acres
- Neighbourhood
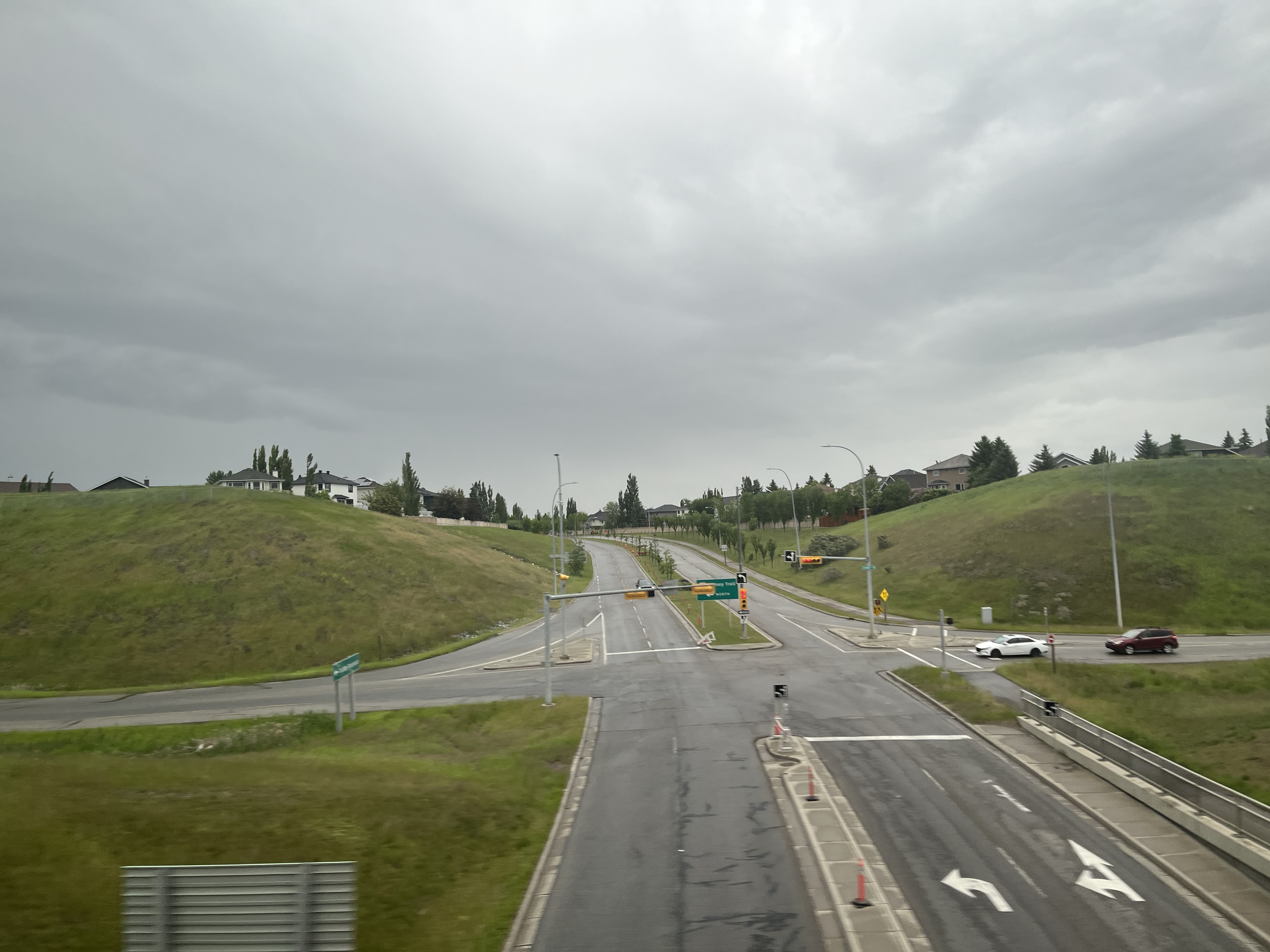

- Location of Scenic Acres in Calgary
- Coordinates: 51°07′10″N 114°12′53″W
- Country: Canada
- Province: Alberta
- City: Calgary
- Quadrant: NW
- Ward: 1
- Established: 1981
- Annexed: 1961

Government
  - Mayor: Jeromy Farkas
  - Administrative body: Calgary City Council
  - Councillor: Kim Tyers (Communities First)

Area
  - Total: 3.4 km^{2} (1.3 sq mi)
- Elevation: 1,180 m (3,870 ft)

Population (2018)
  - Total: 8,090
  - Average Income: $145,685
- Website: Scenic Acres Community Association

Scenic Acres is a residential neighbourhood in the northwest quadrant of Calgary, Alberta. It is bounded to the north by Crowchild Trail, to the east by Nose Hill Drive, to the west by Stoney Trail and to the south by Nose Hill Drive.

The area was annexed by the City of Calgary in the 1960s, and the neighbourhood was established in 1981. It is represented in the Calgary City Council by the Ward 1 councillor.

== Demographics ==
In the City of Calgary's 2018 municipal census, Scenic Acres had a population of 8,090 living in 2,928 dwellings, a 2.0% decrease from its 2017 population of 8,251. With a land area of 4.3 km^{2} (1.7 sq mi), it had a population density of 1,881/km^{2} (4,870/sq mi) in 2018.

Households in this community had a median household income of $145,685 in 2015, and there were 4.0% low income residents living in the neighbourhood. As of 2016, 22.0% of the residents were immigrants. All buildings, except for 3 sites of single-family attached houses, were single-family detached homes, and only 4.0% of the housing was used for renting.

Community Association Beginning

In 1985, with only about 10% of the community developed, the Community Association formed. Because the Area Structure Plan had not had 3rd reading, delayed over transportation issues, the Association worked with the Ward Alderman and the developer to create significant changes to the community design. The threshold of population for the community was moved down from 16,000 to 9,500 by upscaling lot sizes; the Community Centre site was moved from immediately north of Crowchild Twin Arenas to the interior of the community; 2 school sites were amalgamated between Scenic Acres Boulevard and Scurfield Drive, adjacent to the new Community Centre site; Scenic Acres Boulevard was re-aligned to create a significant shift to the south from its previous alignment with its connection to Stoney Trail, with the intention to prevent short-cutting; the Community Association successfully negotiated to have the site of the Nose Hill Drive LRT station moved about 200 meters to the west; a land-swap among three parties was negotiated to permit safe access/egress from LRT parking; and through public input, both the grade of Stoney Trail was lowered and the berm system built higher to reduce noise pollution from Stoney Trail.

Crowfoot LRT Station

On June 5, 2009, a Light Rail Transit station called Crowfoot Station (formerly "Centennial Station" in honor of Alberta's 2005 centennial year) opened serving the Scenic Acres Community and the Crowfoot Business Centre. This station extends the LRT line from Dalhousie Station and has approximately 1,350 Park 'n' Ride stalls. The station can not be accessed by road from Scenic Acres.

== Education ==
The community is served by three elementary school. Monsignor E.L. Doyle Elementary (Catholic K to 6), Scenic Acres (Public K to 4) and Ecole Nouveau Monde (Francophone K to 6).

== See also ==
- List of neighbourhoods in Calgary
