= Central Memorial High School =

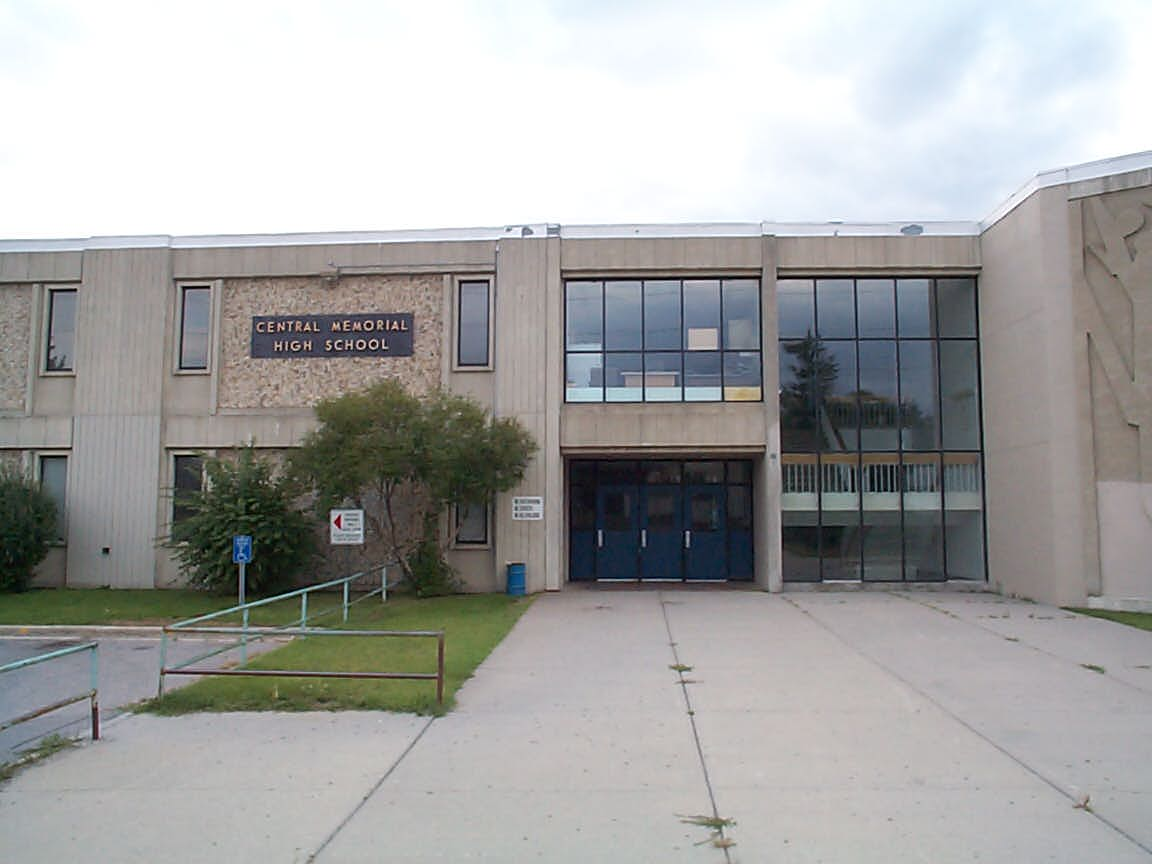

Location
- 5111 - 21 Street S.W. Calgary, Alberta, T3E 1R9; Canada

Information
- Type: Public
- Motto: Pursue your passion
- Established: 1888
- School board: Calgary Board of Education
- Principal: Anne K. Kromm
- Grades: 10, 11, 12
- Enrollment: 1575 (2021)
  - Grade 10: 580
  - Grade 11: 545
  - Grade 12: 450
- Colours: Purple, Yellow
- Team name: Rams
- Communities served: Wildwood, Rosscarrock, Glenbrook, Glendale, Altadore, Garrison Green, Garrison Woods, Westgate, Richmond, Killarney/Glengarry, Discovery Ridge, Currie Barracks, Glamorgan, South Calgary, Shaganappi, Lincoln Park, Lakeview, North Glenmore Park, Westgate, Rutland Park and Spruce Cliff
- Feeder schools: Vincent Massey, A.E. Cross, Bishop Pinkham, Griffith Woods, Willow Park
- Website: school.cbe.ab.ca/school/CentralMemorial/

Central Memorial High School is a public senior high school located in the southwest community of North Glenmore in Calgary, Alberta, Canada. The school was the first high school in Calgary. The school falls under the jurisdiction of the Calgary Board of Education. The school houses unique programs that include the School of Performing and Visual Arts, and the National Sport Academy.

== History ==
The school's name commemorates the original Central Collegiate Institute and Central High School first built in the early 20th century. The school was nicknamed Sleepy Hollow High.

== Performing and visual arts ==
The school now houses a program formed in 2003 named the Centre for Performing and Visual Arts.

== Vocational and technical education ==
The Career and Technology Centre (CTC) at the school offers vocational and technical training, including auto body, computer science, cosmetology, culinary arts, media design and communication, energy and environmental innovation, pre-engineering, and welding and fabrication.

== Athletics ==
The school has a sports department that includes badminton, basketball, cross-country, field hockey, football, soccer, swimming and diving, track and field, volleyball, and wrestling.

The Central Memorial Rams have seen success in sports most recently being their junior basketball team winning a city championship in the 2025-26 season. Other recent success in their sports programs would be the senior boys rugby team getting second place in the city finals of the 25-26 season.

The Central Memorial rams and Dr. E.P. Scarlet Lancers football teams have a recently established “silence of the lams bowl” which comes from their formally conjoined football team which was named the Lams which split in the 2024-25 school year.

== Notable alumni ==
- Ahad Raza Mir, actor and singer

== See also ==
- Center West Campus
