= Rocky Ridge, Calgary =

Rocky Ridge
- Neighbourhood
- Location of Rocky Ridge in Calgary
- Coordinates: 51°08′42″N 114°14′36″W
- Country: Canada
- Province: Alberta
- City: Calgary
- Quadrant: NW
- Ward: 1
- Established: 1998
- Annexed: 1989

Government
  - Mayor: Jeromy Farkas
  - Administrative body: Calgary City Council
  - Councillor: Kim Tyers (Communities First)
- Elevation: 1,265 m (4,150 ft)

Population (2006)
  - Total: 6,043
  - Average Income: $84,282
- Website: Rocky Ridge Community Association

Rocky Ridge is a residential neighbourhood in the northwest quadrant of Calgary, Alberta. It is located at the western edge of the city, and is bounded to the north by Country Hills Boulevard, to the east by Rocky Ridge Road, to the south by Crowchild Trail and to the west by Twelve Mile Coulee Road.

The land was annexed to the City of Calgary in 1989 (from the Municipal District of Rocky View), and Rocky Ridge was established in 1998. It is represented in the Calgary City Council by the Ward 1 councillor.

Rocky Ridge is situated at 1,265 meters (4,150 ft), and with elevation reaching 1,275 meters (4,183 ft).

== Demographics ==
In the City of Calgary's 2012 municipal census, Rocky Ridge had a population of 7,662 living in 2,972 dwellings, a 5.5% increase from its 2011 population of 7,266. With a land area of 2.8 km^{2} (1.1 sq mi), it had a population density of 2,740/km^{2} (7,090/sq mi) in 2012.

Residents in this community had a median household income of $84,282 in 2000, and there were 4.5% low income residents living in the neighbourhood. As of 2000, 17.3% of the residents were immigrants. All buildings were single-family detached homes, and 9.1% of the housing was used for renting.

There are many benefits of living in Rocky Ridge, such as the Rocky Ridge Ranch Centre, the community centre. Rocky Ridge is often associated with Royal Oak, the sister community.

== See also ==
- List of neighbourhoods in Calgary
