= Heritage station (Calgary) =

Light rail station in Calgary, Alberta, Canada

Heritage
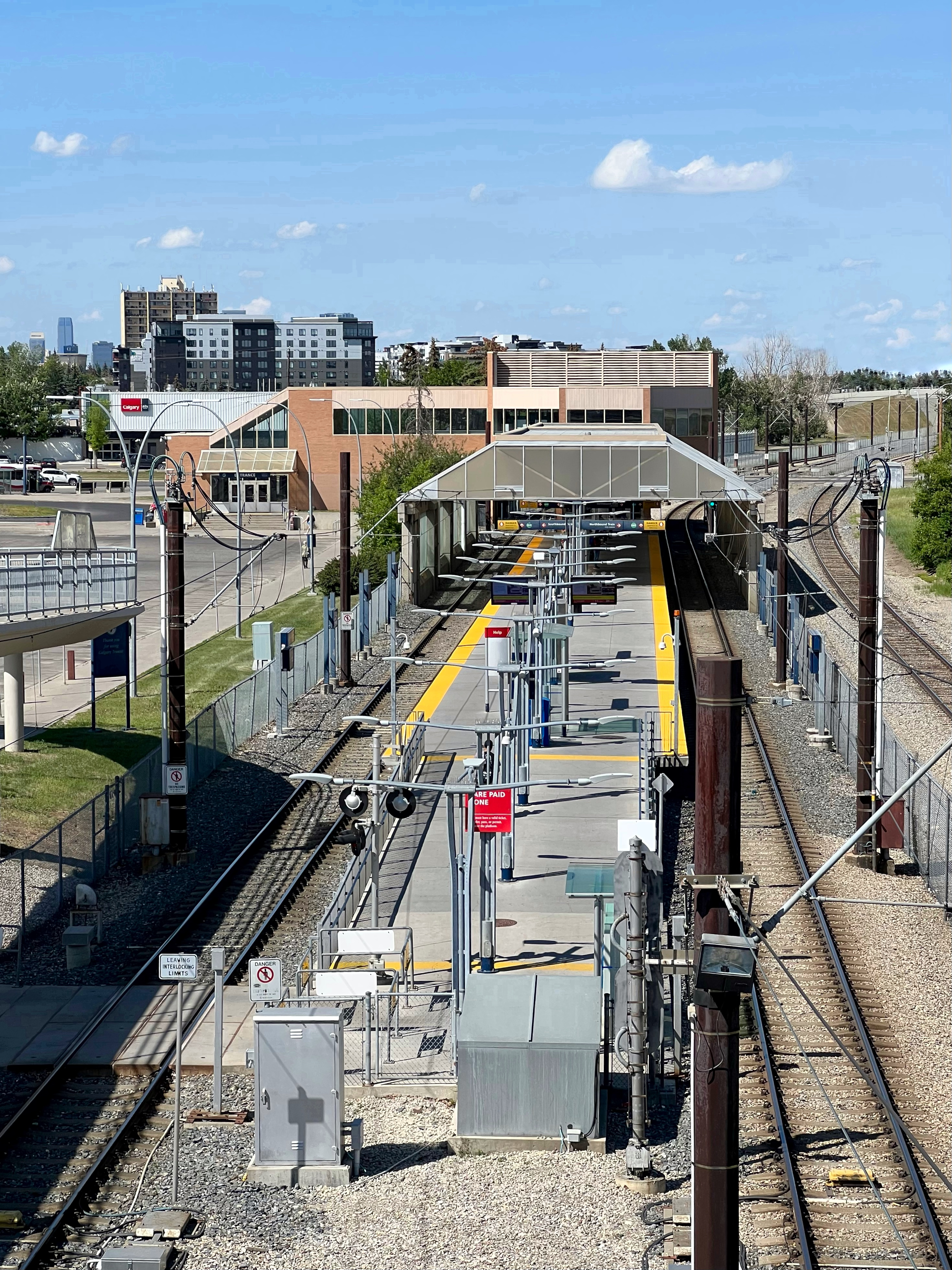

General information
- Location: 12 Haddon Road SW
- Coordinates: 50°58′43″N 114°04′27″W
- Owner: Calgary Transit
- Platforms: Centre-loading platform
- Connections: 3 Centre St/Sandstone; 20 Northmount Drive N 37 Elbow Drive; 56 Woodbine; 81 Highfield; 99 Acadia; 149 Point Trotter Industrial; 402 Heritage Park; Max Teal Westbrook/Douglas Glen

Construction
- Structure type: At-grade
- Parking: 557 spaces
- Cycle facilities: 5 outdoor bike racks
- Accessible: yes

History
- Opened: 1981; 45 years ago
- Rebuilt: 2012; 14 years ago
- Electrified: Overhead catenary

Services
Preceding station	Calgary Transit	Following station
Chinook toward Tuscany	Red Line	Southland toward Somerset–Bridlewood
Location

Heritage Station is a light rail station, part of the Calgary CTrain system, located in the community of Haysboro. The station opened on May 25, 1981.

The station has a 557 space park-and-ride lot, a bus loop, and is located southwest of the intersection of Heritage Drive and Macleod Trail S, 7.9 km (4.9 mi) south of the City Hall Interlocking.

The station consists of a centre-loading platform with mezzanine access at the north end, at-grade access at the south end, and a pedestrian bridge that connects communities to the east.

Heritage Park is located 2.1 kilometres (1.3 miles) west of the station. Calgary Transit operates a direct shuttle bus from Heritage Station to the park, known as Route 402.

As part of Calgary Transit's plans to operate four-car trains by the end of 2014, all three-car stations were extended. Construction at Heritage Station to extend the platform to the South started on July 16, 2012, and the new extended platform and ramp access opened on December 10, 2012.

The Haysboro Light Rail Storage Facility is located just south of the station.

Heritage Station recorded 1,142,000 boardings in 2022 – an average of 3,129 boardings per day.

== Crime ==
Heritage Station has been criticized for having a higher-than-average crime rate when compared to other CTrain stations. In 2022, a Calgary Transit staff member, Stephen Tauro, stated Heritage station was among five others with a higher-than-average crime rate.

During March 2023, the Calgary Police Service conducted an operation at several stations on the CTrain system in an attempt to reduce crime. Officers made arrests and seized a variety of substances and weapons at Heritage Station.

== Transit connections ==
Bus connections to Heritage station as of 31 August, 2026:

- 3 - Sandstone/Centre Street N (North)
- 20 - Northmount Drive N (North)
- 37 - Elbow Drive Canyon Meadows (South)
- 56 - Woodbine (South)
- 81 - Highfield (North) / 81 - Kingsland (South)
- 99 - Acadia (West)
- 149 - Point Trotter Industrial (East)
- 402 - Heritage Park (Seasonal) (West)
- - MAX Teal (Douglas Glen) / - MAX Teal (Westbrook)

== See also ==
- CTrain
- Red Line (Calgary)
- Anderson station (Calgary)
- Chinook station
- Southland station (Calgary)
- Acadia, Calgary
- Haysboro, Calgary
- Kingsland, Calgary
