= Dalhousie station (Calgary) =

Light rail station in Calgary, Alberta, Canada

Dalhousie
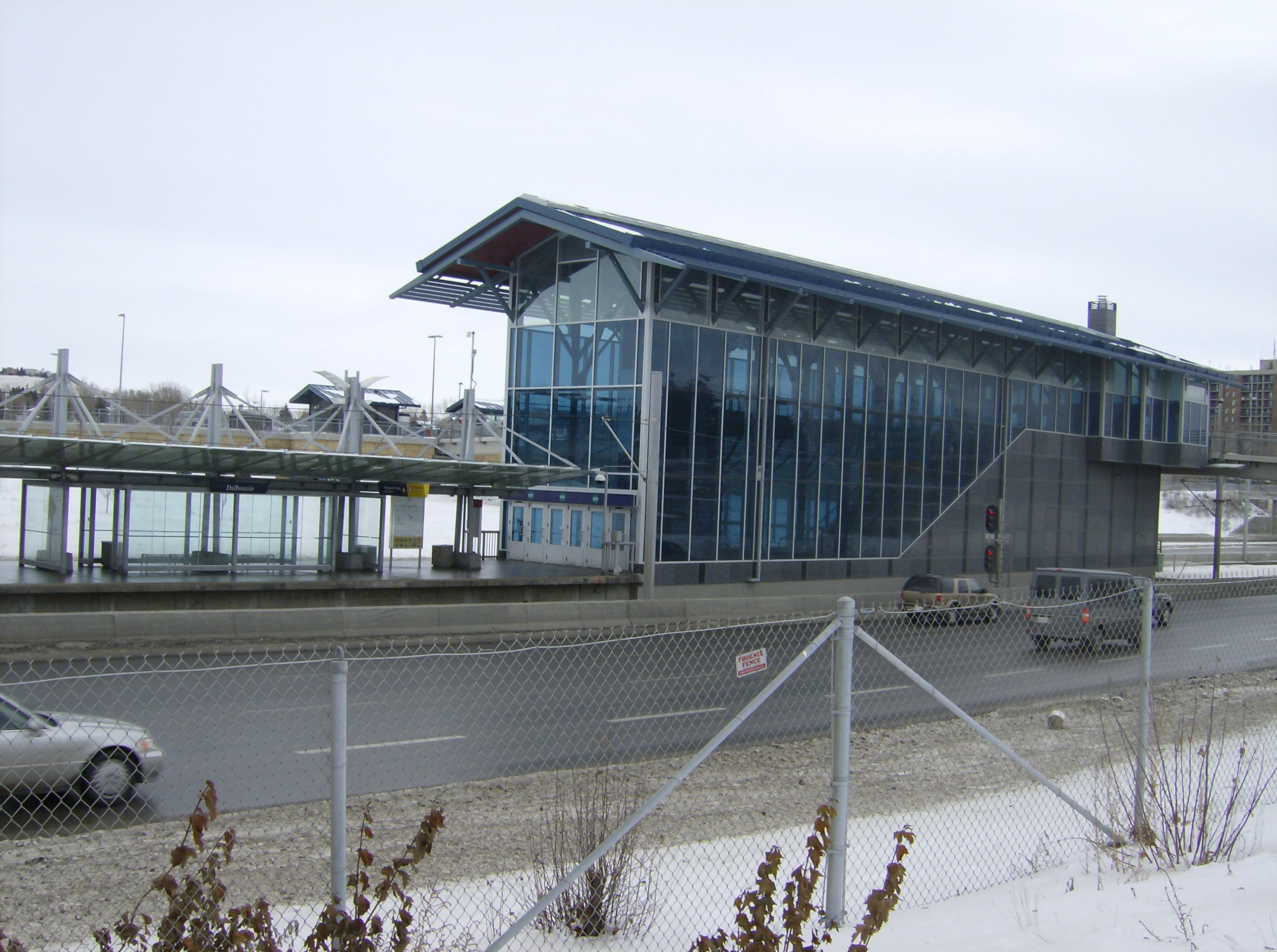

General information
- Location: 4785 Dalhousie Drive NW
- Coordinates: 51°06′12″N 114°09′39″W
- Owner: Calgary Transit
- Platforms: Center-loading platform
- Connections: 9 Chinook; 19 16 Avenue North; 54 Edgevalley; 76 Hawkwood; 77 Edgemont; 97 South Ranchlands; 105 Lions Park; 113 North Ranchlands; 120 North Silver Springs; 129 Sage Hill; 134 South Silver Springs; 154 Hamptons; 422 Dalhousie/Montogomery

Construction
- Structure type: At-grade
- Parking: 760 spaces
- Accessible: yes

History
- Opened: 2003; 23 years ago

Services
Preceding station	Calgary Transit	Following station
Crowfoot toward Tuscany	Red Line	Brentwood toward Somerset–Bridlewood
Location

Dalhousie station is a CTrain light rail station in Dalhousie, Calgary, Alberta, Canada. It opened on December 15, 2003, as part of a 2.8 km (1.73 miles) extension of the Northwest line, and was the terminal station of the NW line until June 14, 2009.

== Location ==
The station is located in the median of Crowchild Trail, between 53 Street Northwest and Shaganappi Trail, and is 9 km (5.6 mi) northwest of the 7 Avenue & 9 Street SW interlocking. Also located adjacent to Varsity Estates, the station opened on December 15, 2003, and was the first CTrain station to open with a four-car platform. Since then, all new extension stations have opened with four-car platforms.

== Facilities ==
The station has 760 parking spaces built near the Dalhousie Shopping Centre. In 2003, the park and ride lot was very crowded and would fill up very early in the morning. Since Crowfoot station opened in 2009, with almost double the spaces as Dalhousie, the situation has eased somewhat.

Pedestrian overpasses connect the communities of Varsity and Dalhousie over Crowchild Trail. Two escalators, a set of stairs, and an elevator provide access down to the platform.

In 2008, the station registered an average of 18,300 boardings per weekday.

== Buses ==
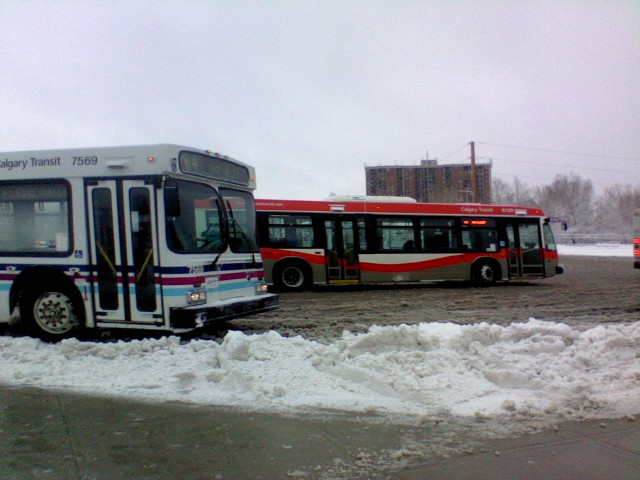
The bus loop at Dalhousie station on a snowy day.

The following routes originate or terminate at Dalhousie Station:

- 9 - Chinook
- 19 - Sunridge
- 54 - Edgevalley
- 76 - Hawkwood
- 77 - Edgemont
- 97 - South Ranchlands/Scenic Acres / Crowfoot
- 105 - Dalhousie/Lions Park
- 113 - North Ranchlands/Scenic Acres / Crowfoot
- 120 - Silver Springs/Crowfoot
- 129 - Sage Hill
- 134 - Rockland Park
- 154 - Hamptons
- 422 - Dalhousie/Montgomery
