= Crowfoot station =

Light rail station in Calgary, Alberta, Canada

Crowfoot
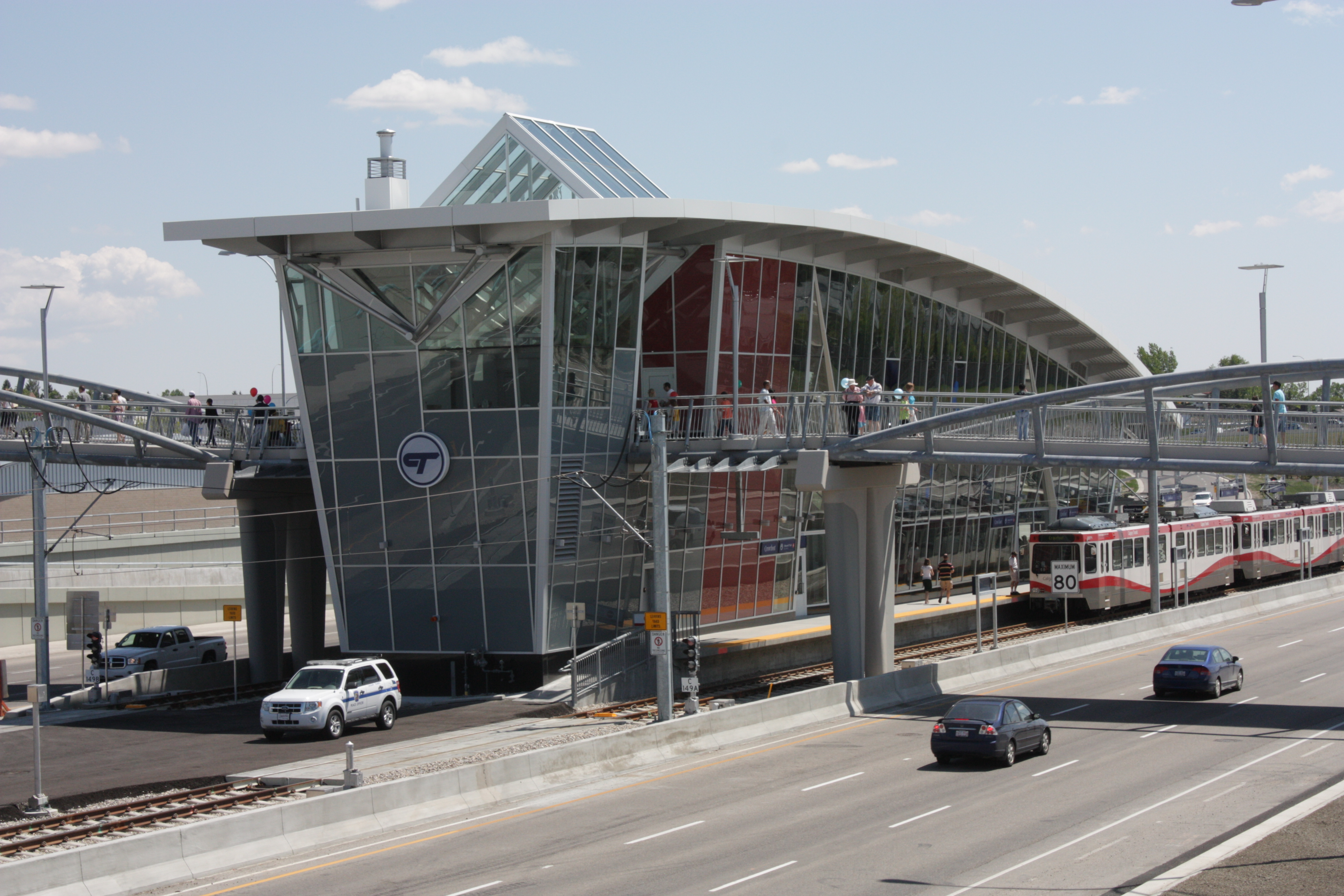

General information
- Location: 141 Crowfoot Way NW
- Coordinates: 51°07′23″N 114°12′27″W
- Owner: Calgary Transit
- Platforms: Centre-loading platform
- Tracks: 2

Construction
- Structure type: At-grade
- Parking: 1345 spaces
- Accessible: yes

History
- Opened: 2009; 17 years ago

Services
Preceding station	Calgary Transit	Following station
Tuscany Terminus	Red Line	Dalhousie toward Somerset–Bridlewood
Location

Crowfoot station is a CTrain light rail station in Calgary, Alberta, Canada adjacent to Scenic Acres and Arbour Lake. It opened on June 15, 2009 as part of a 4 km extension, of Route 201 and was the line's northern terminus until August 23, 2014.

== Location ==
Crowfoot Station Platform
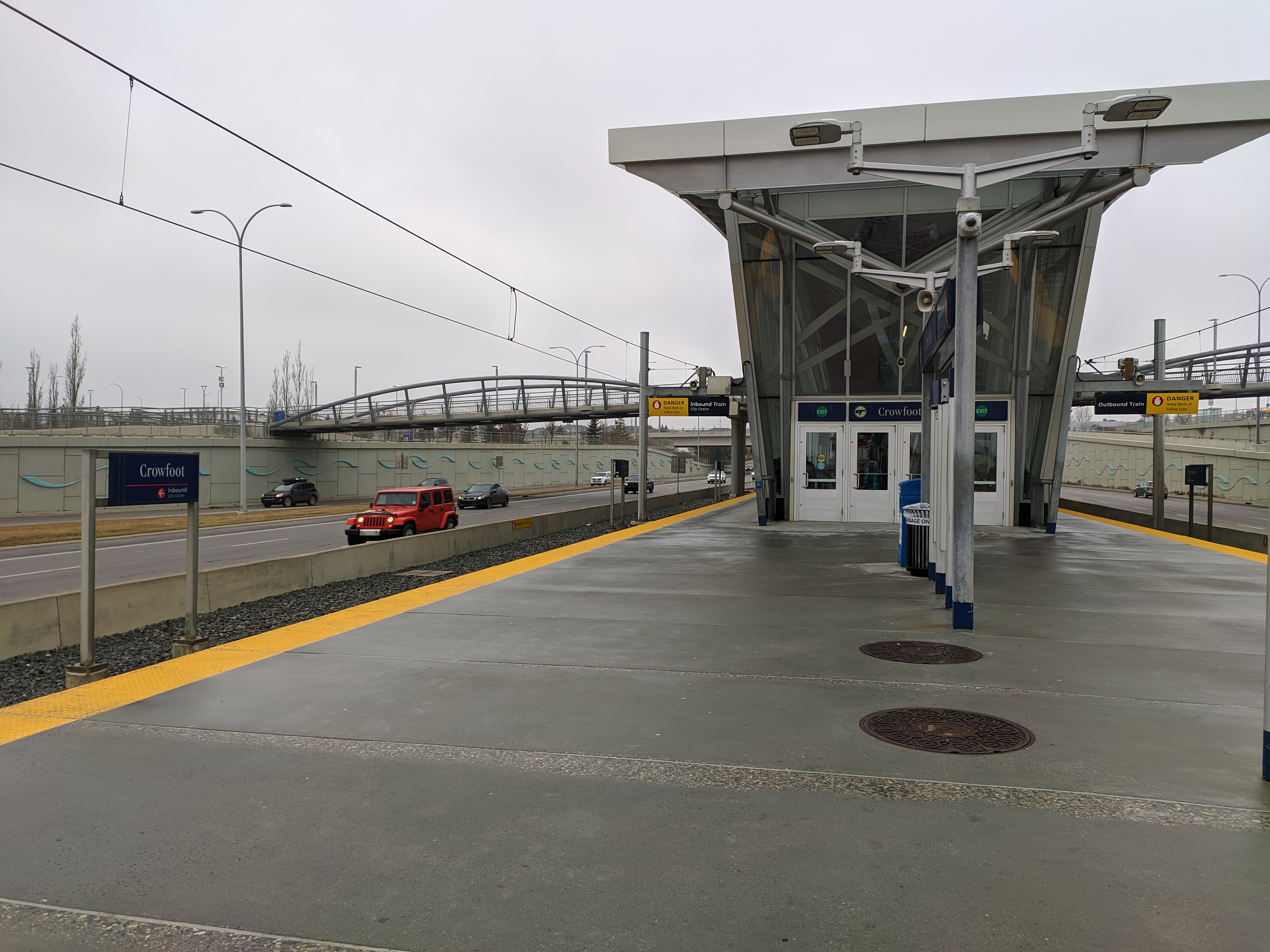

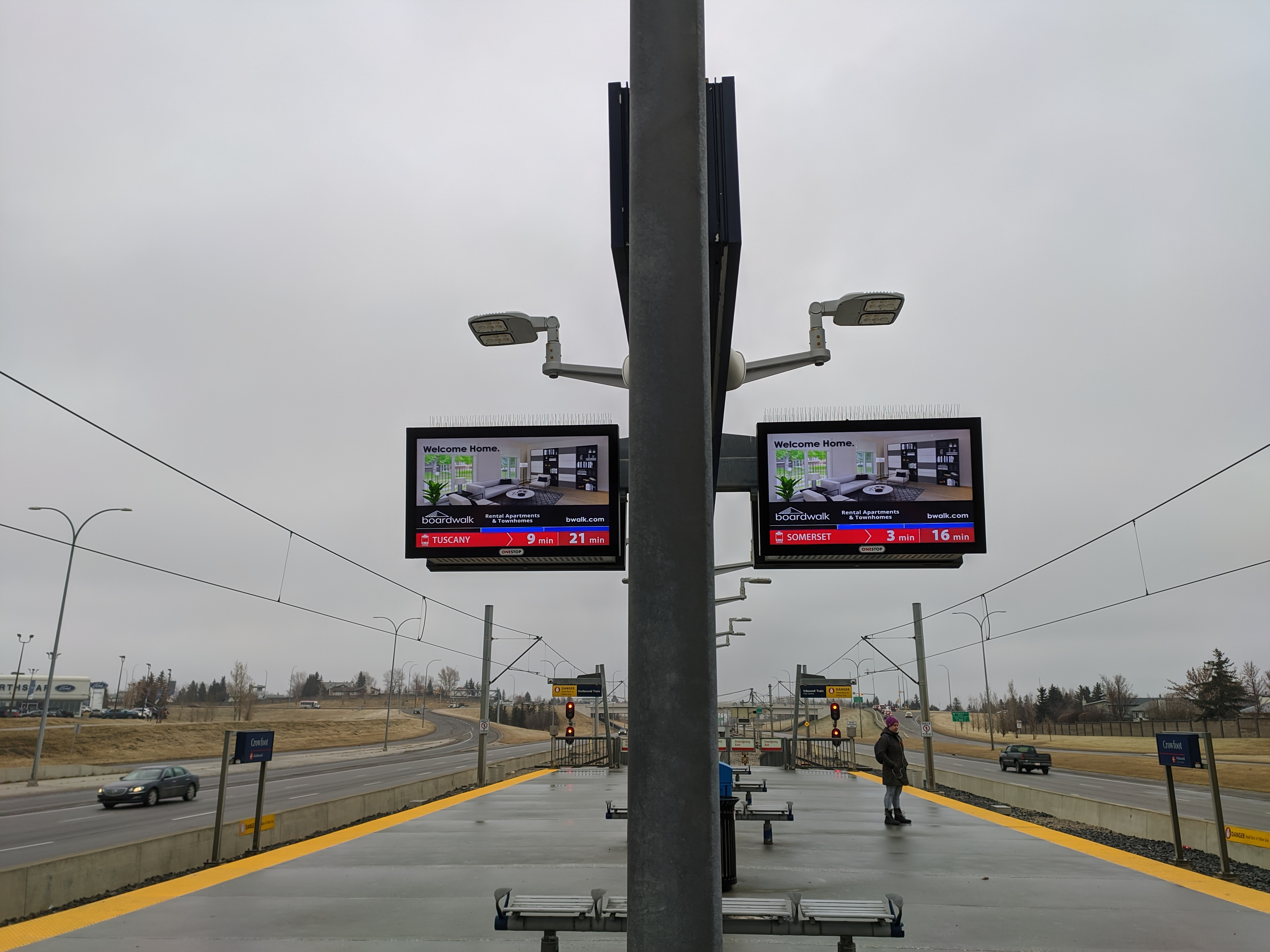
Platform facing north (top) and facing south (bottom).

The station is located in the median of Crowchild Trail, 13 km (8.1 mi) Northwest of the 7 Avenue & 9 Street SW interlocking, between Nose Hill Drive and Crowfoot Parade. Designed with a 1345 stall Park and Ride lot and pedestrian overpasses that connect the station directly to both the Scenic Acres community, as well as provide a link to Crowfoot Centre.

== Facilities ==
Inside the station building, two escalators, a set of stairs, and an elevator provide access to the platform. The Crowfoot Station is unique in that the Western end of the platform wraps around the station building. A heated shelter and bike lock-up is also available by the park-and-ride on the north side of the station.

== Buses ==
The following bus routes originate or terminate at Crowfoot Station:

- 40 - North Hill (East)
- 76 - Hawkwood (East) / Dalhousie
- 97 - South Ranchlands/Scenic Acres/Dalhousie (West)
- 97 - South Ranchlands/Scenic Acres/Dalhousie (East)
- 113 - North Ranchlands/Scenic Acres/Dalhousie (West)
- 113 - North Ranchlands/Scenic Acres/Dalhousie (East)
- 120 - Silver Springs (East) / Dalhousie
- 138 - Citadel/Tuscany (West)
- 299 - Arbour Lake (North)
