= Victoria Park/Stampede station =

Light rail station in Calgary, Alberta, Canada

Victoria Park/Stampede
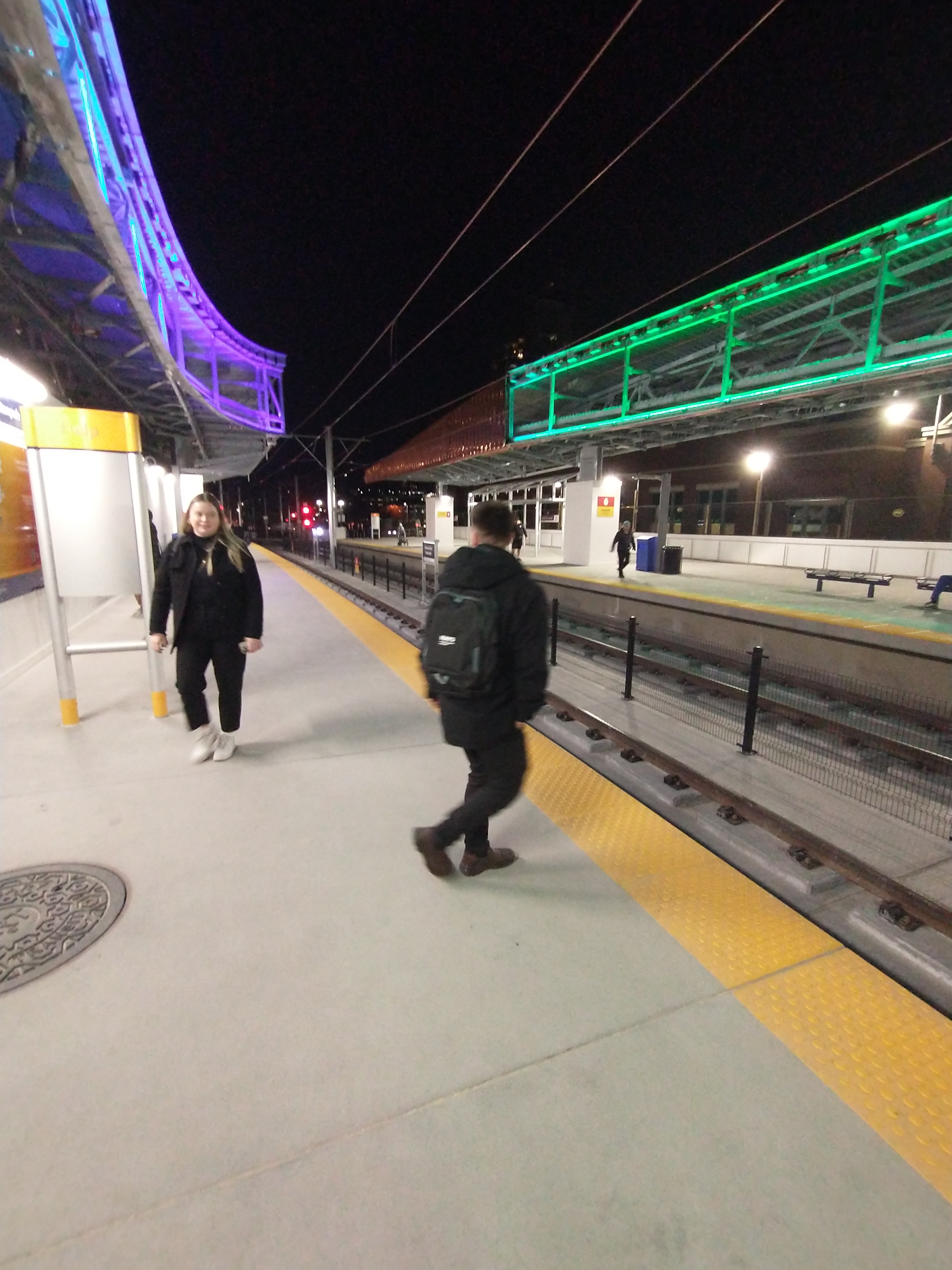
- Victoria Park/Stampede Station on opening day after rebuilding

General information
- Other names: Victoria Park
- Location: 1414 Macleod Trail SE
- Coordinates: 51°02′18″N 114°03′30″W
- Owner: Calgary Transit
- Platforms: Side
- Connections: 10 Macleod Trail

Construction
- Structure type: At-grade
- Parking: No
- Accessible: yes

History
- Opened: 1981; 45 years ago
- Rebuilt: 1990; 36 years ago (interior renovations) 2013; 13 years ago (minor); 2022; 4 years ago (replaced with temporary platform) 2023; 3 years ago (replaced with entirely new station)
- Former names: Stampede

Services
Preceding station	Calgary Transit	Following station
City Hall/Bow Valley College toward Tuscany	Red Line	Erlton/Stampede toward Somerset–Bridlewood
Location

Victoria Park/Stampede station (named Stampede station until 1995) is a CTrain light rail station in the Calgary, Alberta, neighbourhood of Beltline, used as a part of the Red Line. The station is adjacent to Stampede Park, the site of the Calgary Stampede. The station opened on May 25, 1981, under the name Stampede Station, as part of the original line.

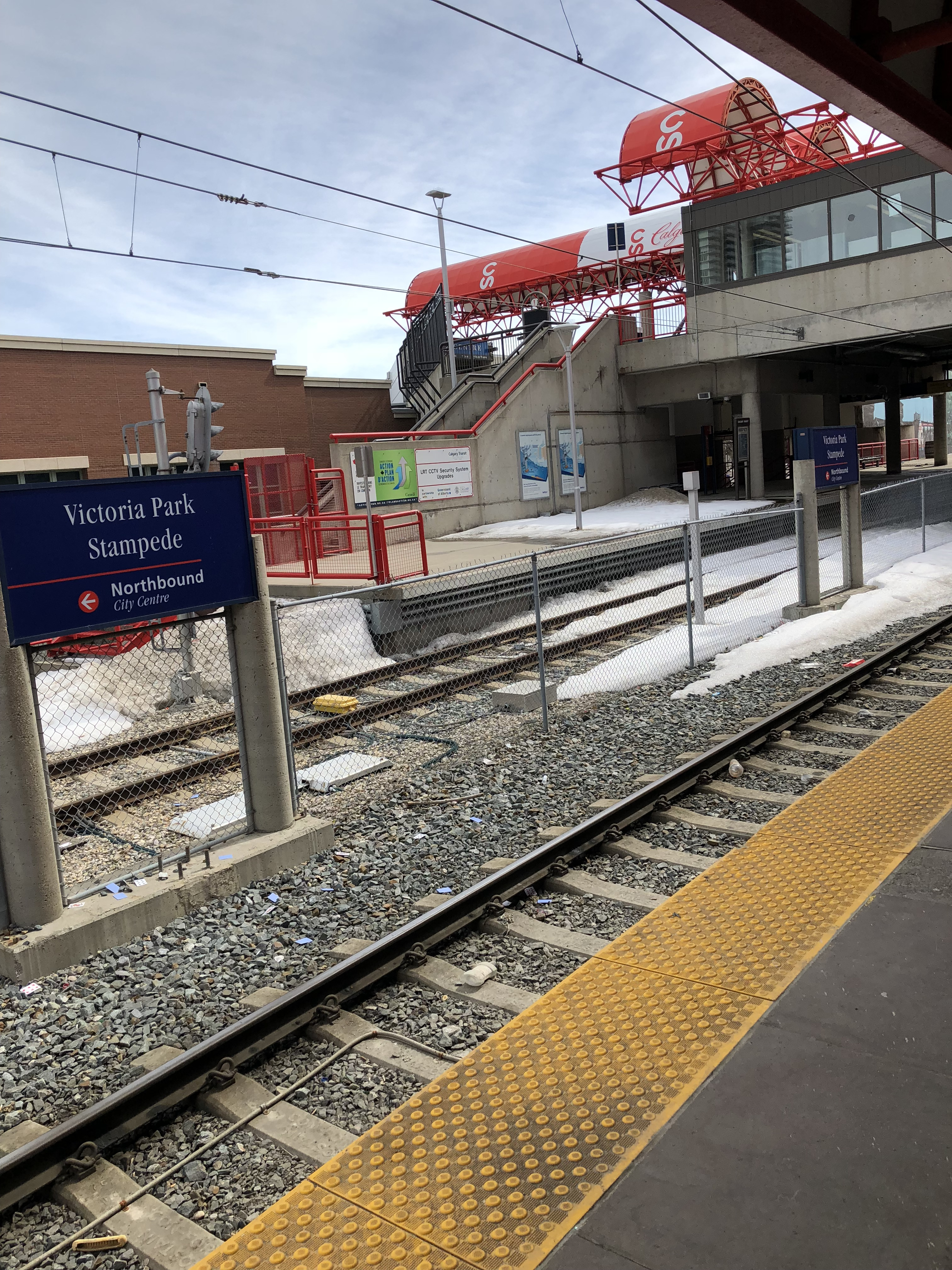
Victoria Park/Stampede Station was the only C-Train station to contain 3 platforms prior to the station's replacement.

The station is located on the exclusive LRT right of way, 1 km (0.62 mi) south of the City Hall interlocking beside Macleod Trail just north of 17 Avenue SW.

Victoria Park/Stampede Station used to be the only station on the network to contain three platforms. Prior to the replacement of the station, the third platform was used rarely for major events such as Calgary Flames games or the Calgary Stampede.

As part of Calgary Transit's plan to operate four-car trains by the end of 2014, all three-car platforms were extended. Construction on a platform extension at Victoria Park/Stampede was completed in the fall of 2013.

The station registered an average of 10,100 weekday passengers in 2007.

== Replacement ==
In 2019, the City of Calgary favoured demolishing the aging 1981 station and replacing it with an entirely new station. The new station was decided to be a street-level two-platform station similar to in design to City Hall/Bow Valley College and Downtown West/Kerby Stations. On top of the new station, this project would add an extension of 17 Avenue SE and a new multi-model entrance into Stampede Park.

As a result of the construction, there were two major CTrain closures. One was around Thanksgiving Weekend 2022 between 39 Avenue S and City Hall stations, and the other was a major nine-day long closure starting on November 24, 2023, between Chinook and City Hall/Bow Valley College stations. The magnitude of the 2023 closures caused segments of the remaining C-Train network to be rerouted, with the Red Line running on the Northeast Leg of the Blue Line and the Blue Line running on the Northwest Leg of the Red Line. The train routes during the closure were:

- Chinook – Somerset-Bridlewood (Red Line)
- Tuscany – Saddletowne (Red Line)
- Tuscany – Saddletowne (Blue Line)
- 69 Street – Saddletowne (Blue Line)

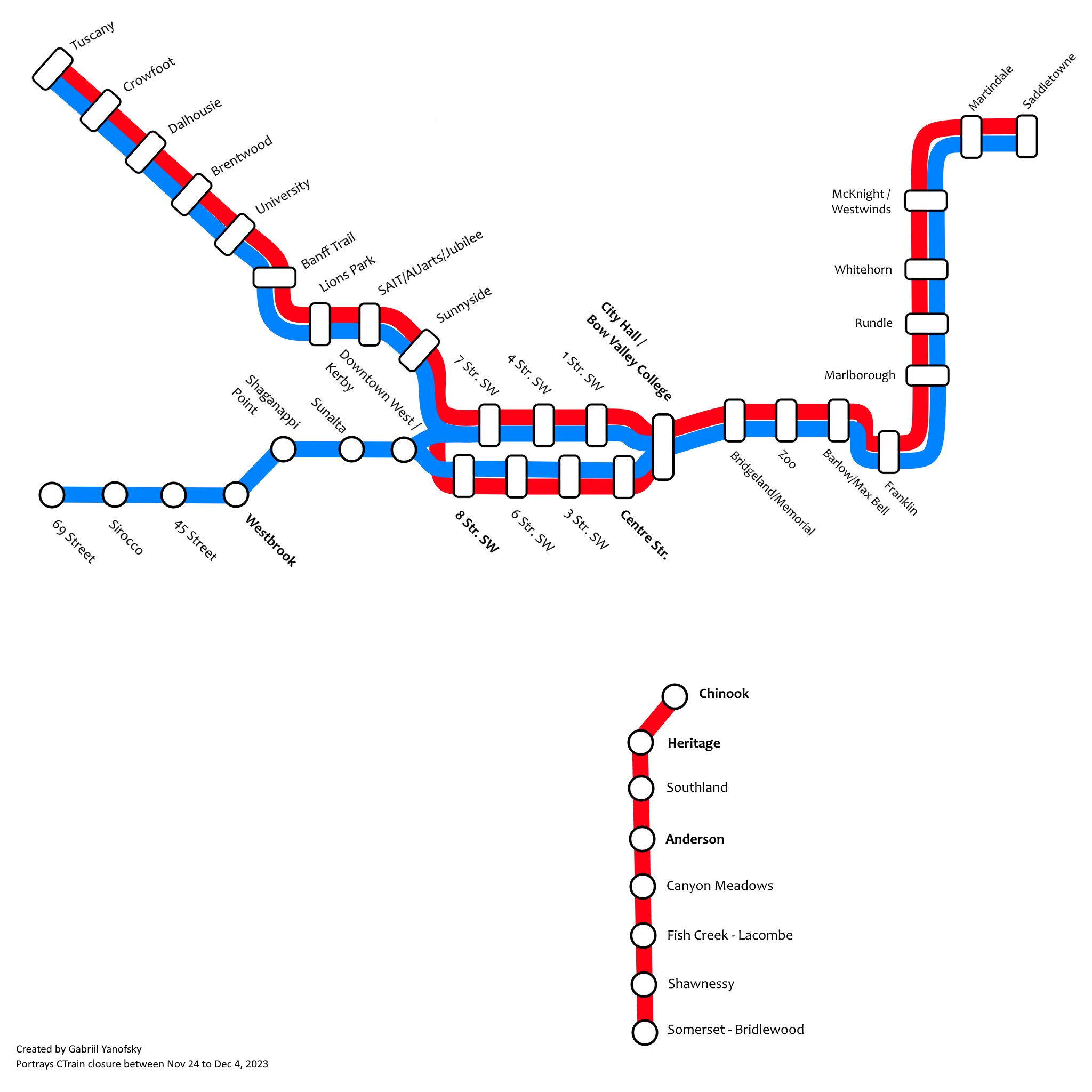
Map of the late 2023 closures which were a result of this station's construction

== Around the station ==
=== Major destinations ===
- BMO Centre
- Calgary Stampede
- Cowboys Casino
- Elbow River Casino
- MNP Community & Sport Centre
- Saddledome
- Scotia Place (future)
- World's Tallest Mural

=== Communities ===
- Beltline
  - Connaught Centre (sub-community of the Beltline)
  - East Victoria Crossing (sub-community of the Beltline)
  - Victoria Park (sub-community of the Beltline)
- Cliff Bungalow
- Erlton
- Mission
- Ramsay

=== Major streets ===
- 12 Avenue S
- 17 Avenue S
- Agriculture Trail
- Macleod Trail
- Stampede Trail

== Transit connections ==
Bus connections to the station as of 31 August, 2026

- 10 - Macleod Trail City Hall (North) / 10 - Macleod Trail Southcentre (South)

== See also ==
- CTrain
- Red Line (Calgary)
- Erlton/Stampede station
- Calgary Stampede
- Beltline, Calgary
