= Erlton/Stampede station =

Light rail station in Calgary, Alberta, Canada

Erlton/Stampede
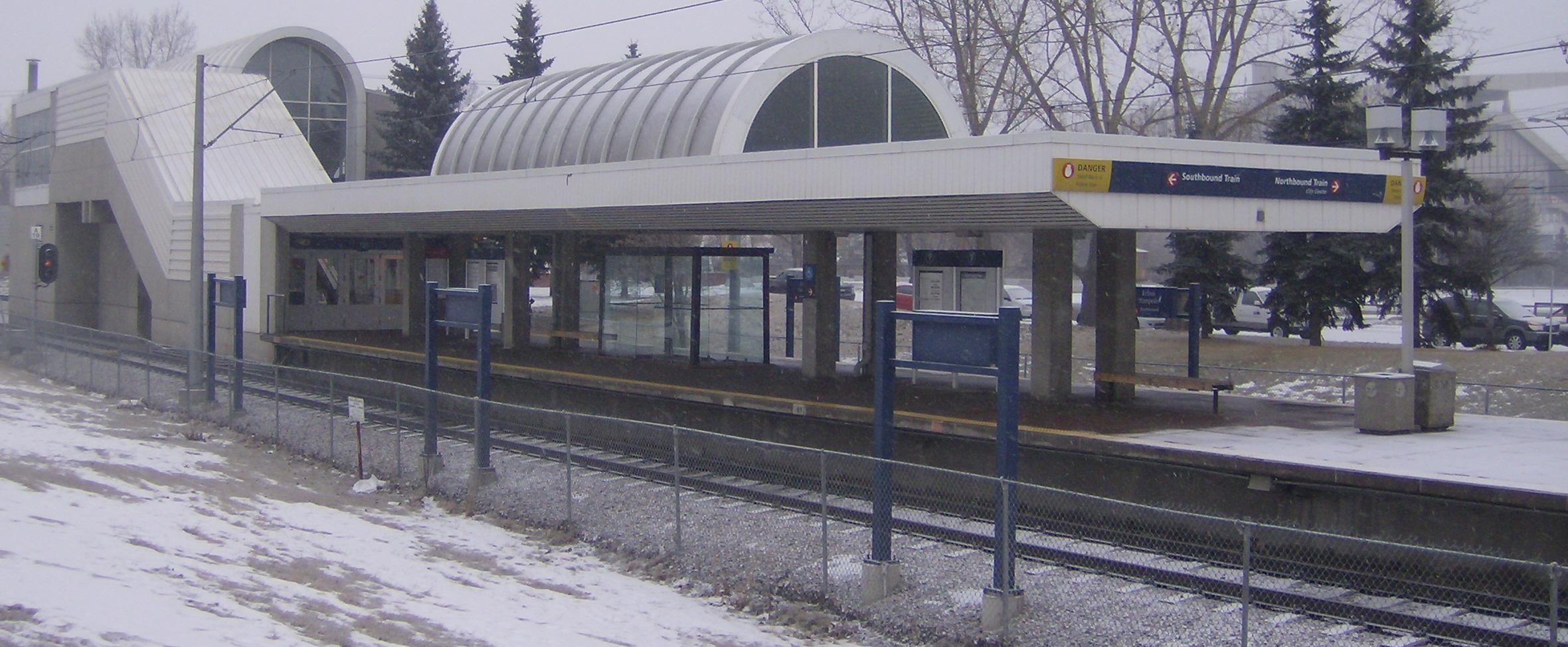

General information
- Location: 2408-3A St. SE
- Coordinates: 51°01′56″N 114°03′31″W
- Owner: Calgary Transit
- Platforms: Center-loading platform
- Connections: 10 Macleod Trail; 17 Renfrew/Ramsay

Construction
- Structure type: At-grade
- Parking: No
- Accessible: yes

History
- Opened: 1981; 45 years ago
- Rebuilt: 2011; 15 years ago
- Former names: Erlton

Services
Preceding station	Calgary Transit	Following station
Victoria Park/Stampede toward Tuscany	Red Line	39 Avenue toward Somerset–Bridlewood
Location

Erlton/Stampede Station (formerly named Erlton until 1995) is a CTrain light rail station in the Calgary, Alberta community of Erlton. It is located on the southern leg of the Red Line, and is the station south of Victoria Park/Stampede and north of 39 Avenue South. The station opened on May 25, 1981, as part of the original South line. The station consists of a center-loading platform with mezzanine access on the North end of the platform and grade-level access at the South end of the platform.

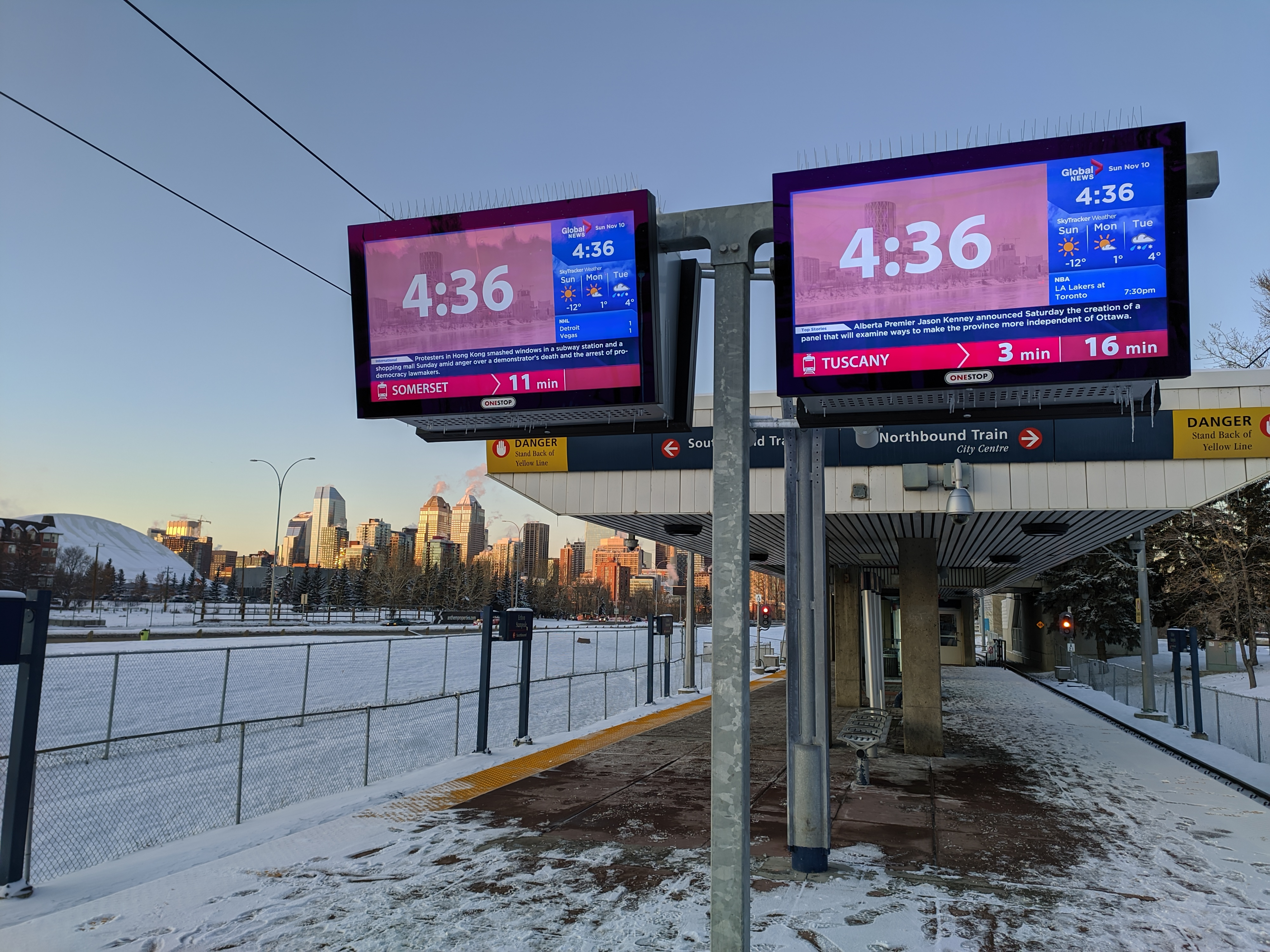
Platform of Erlton/Stampede station, with MNP Community & Sport Centre and downtown Calgary in the background

The station serves the neighborhood of Erlton and the south entrance of Stampede Park, the site of the Calgary Stampede. It serves as an alternate access to the park and is often favoured by riders wishing to avoid the crowds at Victoria Park/Stampede.

In 2005, the station registered an average of 1,700 boardings per weekday.

As part of Calgary Transit's plan to introduce four-car trains, Erlton/Stampede has had its platform extended to the south and can now handle four-car trains. Construction took place and the south grade-level access was temporarily closed from July 29 – December 7, 2011.

== Advertisement campaign ==
The station was featured in a Calgary Transit advertisement campaign that ran throughout 2022 and 2023, advertising the MyFare app.

== Transit connections ==
Bus connections to the station as of 31 August, 2026

- 10 - Macleod Trail City Hall (North) / 10 - Macleod Trail Southcentre (South)
- 17 - Ramsay (South) / 17 - Renfrew (North)

== See also ==
- CTrain
- Red Line (Calgary)
- Victoria Park/Stampede station
- Calgary Stampede
- Erlton, Calgary
- Transit station
