= Manchester, Calgary =

Calgary neighbourhood

Manchester
- Neighbourhood
- Location of Manchester in Calgary
- Country: Canada
- Province: Alberta
- City: Calgary
- Quadrant: SE/SW
- Ward: 9
- Established: 1914

Area
  - Total: 0.4648 km^{2} (0.1795 sq mi)

Population (2021)
  - Total: 950
- Postal code: T2H

Manchester is a residential neighborhood of Calgary, Alberta, Canada. It straddles both the southeast and southwest quadrants of Calgary and neighbors the industrial community of Manchester Industrial to the east, south and north. Manchester is in Ward 9. The community is among one of Calgary's oldest, but has been one of the most affected by urban decay.

Manchester consists of mostly low-income housing and housing projects, with a significant portion of such being built in 2003 in the southern portion of the community.

Manchester has the lowest income and highest percentage of residents classified as low-income of any Calgary community by a decent margin. Manchester additionally struggles with crime, urban blight, homelessness, and poverty.

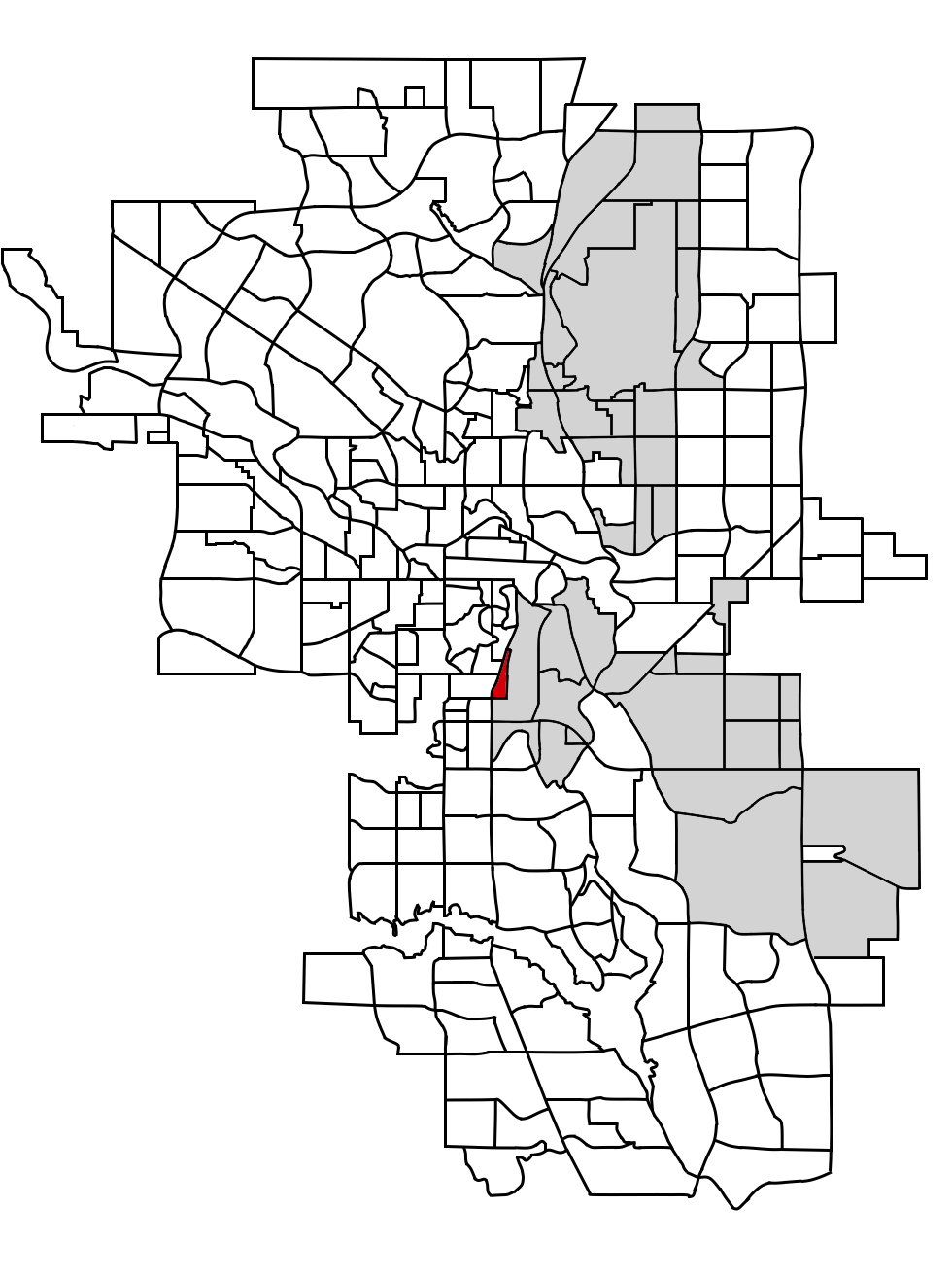
Location of Manchester in Calgary

== Community boundaries ==
The community of Manchester is in both the southeast and southwest quadrants of Calgary. It is bounded by 42 Avenue South to the north, 58 Avenue South to the south, Macleod Trail to the west and the Canadian Pacific right-of-way to the east. Manchester Industrial sits to the east, south and north of the community. The residential neighborhoods of Elboya, Parkhill and Windsor Park bound the community to the west.

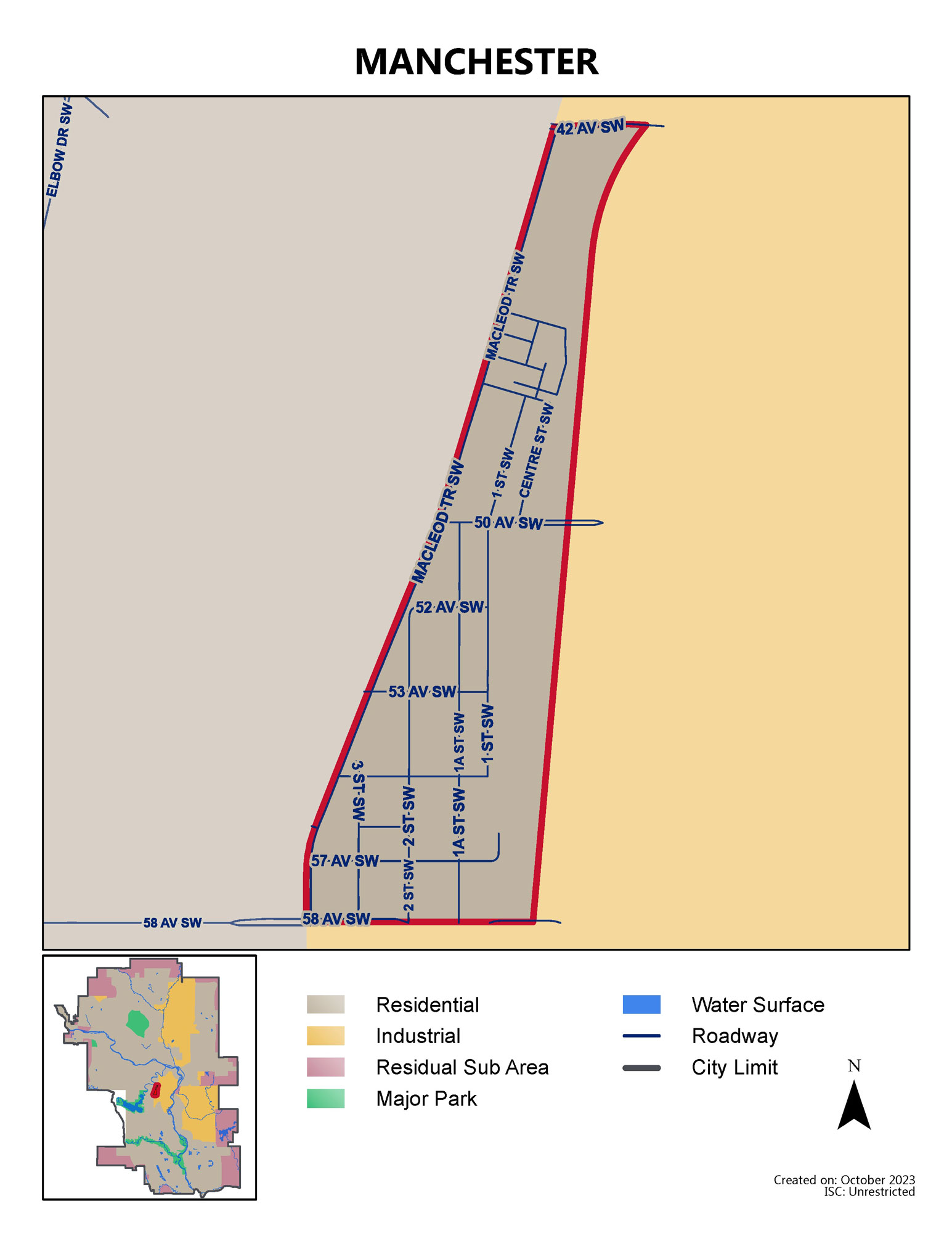
Map of the community boundaries of Manchester, according to the City of Calgary

== History ==
Manchester was originally established in 1914 as a residential community within walking distance of employment centers in the nearby industrial area. The majority of the residential dwellings in the community had been built by 1940. By 1968 the population in Manchester had reached 800 residents across 255 dwellings. Throughout the 1960s and 1970s the population declined with the rapid suburbanization of Calgary.

=== Heritage sites ===
==== Manchester workers' cottages ====
Heritage Calgary added the Manchester workers' cottages to its list of heritage sites on December 12, 2014. The cottages use Edwardian cottage architecture and are on 1 Street SW. As of 2025 they have no legal protection.

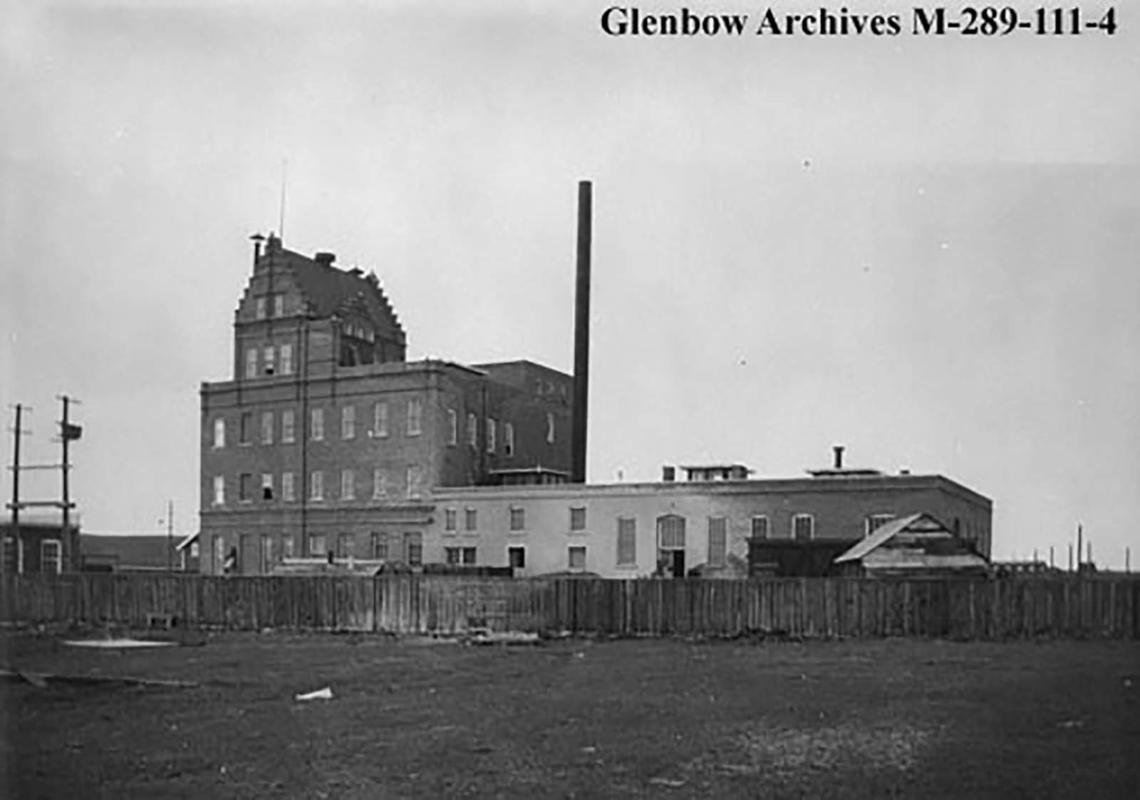
Mountain Spring Brewing facility (1920), formerly in Manchester

== Crime ==
=== Crime data by year ===
Crime data
Year	Crime rate
2018	10.9 /100
2019	14.5 /100
2020	13.2 /100
2021	9.7 /100
2022	13.5 /100
2023	7.1 /100

=== Homicides ===
On 5 August, 2000, Ranji Bhar came to the defense of an innocent man being beaten-up outside of a bar. The perpetrator would then strike Bhar from behind when he was trying to defuse the situation, with Bhar's head hitting the pavement, causing a fatal head injury.

On 18 December, 2011, Lloyd Douglas Bramley fatally stabbed his roommate Genaro Ccopa-Huaman after Genaro had complained about a loud television and the smell of drug smoke. Bramley would then stab his roommate 48 times in the head and eyes with a screwdriver.

On 12 August, 2013, Lacey Yvonne Manion was fatally hit-and-run in the parking lot of a Holiday Inn location. The couple responsible for the homicide were also involved in a large-scale fraud network in the city of Medicine Hat.

On 6 September, 2017, the body of Valeri Lomakine was found directly outside his residence with stab wounds. Lomakine's murder is still unsolved.

In the early morning hours of 13 August, 2020, police were called to Manchester after reports of an assault occurring directly outside of a house. When police arrived, they discovered Anthony Taylor's body, with severe stab wounds. The residence has been noted as a problem-house, with significant drug-activity.

In the early mornings out of 1 October, 2021, a pedestrian with an undisclosed identity was travelling next to MacLeod Trail, when a light-coloured pick-up truck hit him. The case was later ruled as a fatal hit-and-run.

On 11 April, 2023, the body of John Sidney Taylor was found in an alley-way near the CTrain railway in the Manchester neighborhood. Taylor's murder is still unsolved.

== Education ==
The Calgary Board of Education currently serves Manchester via Elboya School (grades K-9) and Henry Wise Wood High School (grades 10-12).

Previously, the Calgary Board of Education ran Manchester Elementary School in the community. The school was closed in 1973 due to low enrolment resulting from the declining local population. The building was torn down in 2004 and the site was later redeveloped.

== Population and demographics ==
=== Population ===
According to the 2021 Calgary municipal census, the community of Manchester had a population of 950, a decrease from the 2019 population of 1,025.

Population history
Year	Population
2014	1332
2015	1055
2016	1013
2017	1052
2018	998
2019	1025
2021	950

=== Income ===
According to the 2021 Calgary municipal census, Manchester had a median household income of $44,000, compared to the city-wide median of $98,000. Thirty-nine percent of households spent 30% or more of their income on shelter, compared to a city-wide average of 23%. Thirty-nine percent of Manchester households made less than $40,000 per year, compared to 15% for Calgary as a whole. Twenty-nine percent of applicable households were low-income in Manchester, compared to the city-wide figure of 9%.

=== Demographics ===
According to the 2021 Calgary municipal census, 42% of Manchester's population were immigrants, compared to 32% for the city as a whole. Forty-six percent of Manchester's immigrant population was born in Africa, compared to 12% of the wider Calgary population.

== Transit ==
Manchester is close to two CTrain stations: 39 Avenue South and Chinook.

Bus route 10 runs between Downtown and Anderson Station along the community's western boundary on Macleod Trail. Bus route 81 runs through the community via 50 Avenue SE and 58 Avenue SW. Bus route 9 runs along the southern edge of the community on 58 Avenue SW.

Walk Score gave Manchester a walk score rating of 68 and a transit score rating of 61.

== See also ==
- List of neighbourhoods in Calgary
- 39 Avenue station (Calgary)
- CF Chinook Centre
- Chinook station
- Macleod Trail
- Parkhill, Calgary
- Windsor Park, Calgary
