= Manulife Centre =

Building in Toronto

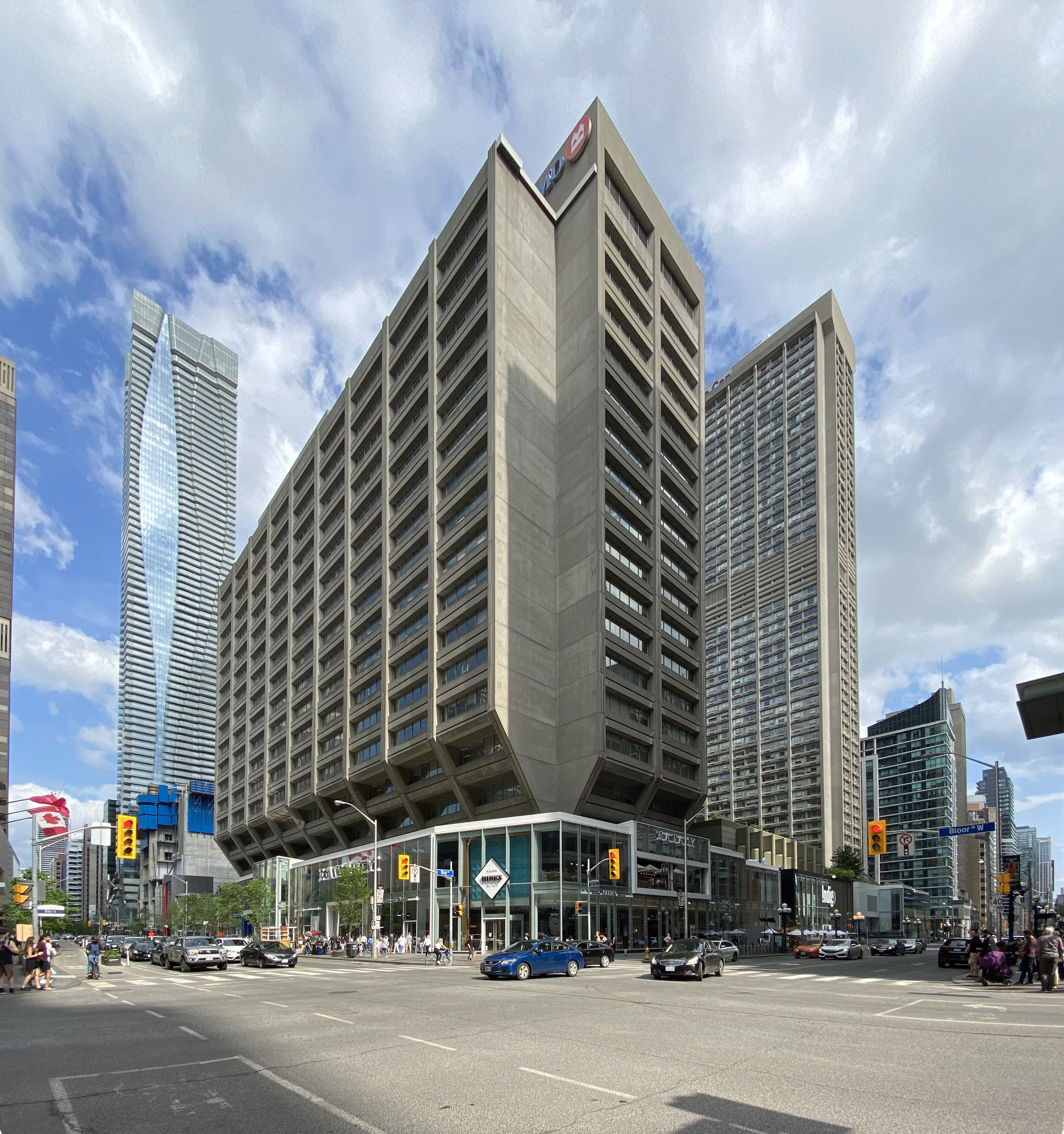
- Interactive map of the Manulife Centre area

General information
- Type: Mixed-use (Retail, Residential, Office)
- Location: 55 Bloor Street West; Toronto, Ontario; M4W 1A5
- Coordinates: 43°40′10″N 79°23′18″W
- Construction started: 1970
- Completed: 1974

Technical details
- Floor count: 51

Design and construction
- Architect: Clifford & Lawrie
- Structural engineer: Jablonsky, Ast and Partners
- Main contractor: Goldie Burgess Limited

References
- Skyscraper Center

The Manulife Centre anchors the prominent southeast corner of Bay and Bloor streets, in Downtown Toronto, positioning it along the prestigious Mink Mile and at the Southern gateway to the renowned Yorkville district of Toronto, Ontario, Canada. The property features a three-story retail podium that seamlessly connects an office tower at its north end with residential towers to the south, creating an integrated mixed-use development.

== History ==
Designed by the Toronto architectural firm of Clifford and Lawrie Architects, construction began in 1970 and was completed in 1974. It was developed and built for Manulife Financial, the current owners. Early retail tenants at the Manulife Centre included Bretton's department store (60,000 square feet), Creed's (38,000 square feet), Harridge's, and other luxury tenants. Over time, these three large retailers went bankrupt and closed.

== Today ==
Retailers at Manulife Centre includes Birks and Indigo Books. Bay Bloor Radio, which was founded in 1946, moved into the Manulife Centre when it opened and remains there today. A tunnel connects the basement level of the shopping concourse to Holt Renfrew at 50 Bloor Street West on the north side of Bloor.

Manulife Centre is home to Canada's first flagship Eataly location as well as Over the Rainbow, a fashion retailer, and Shoppers Drug Mart.

Manulife Centre connects to Bay station on Line 2 Bloor–Danforth via the tunnel to 60 Bloor Street West. Tunnels also provide access to Toronto's busiest subway station Bloor–Yonge.

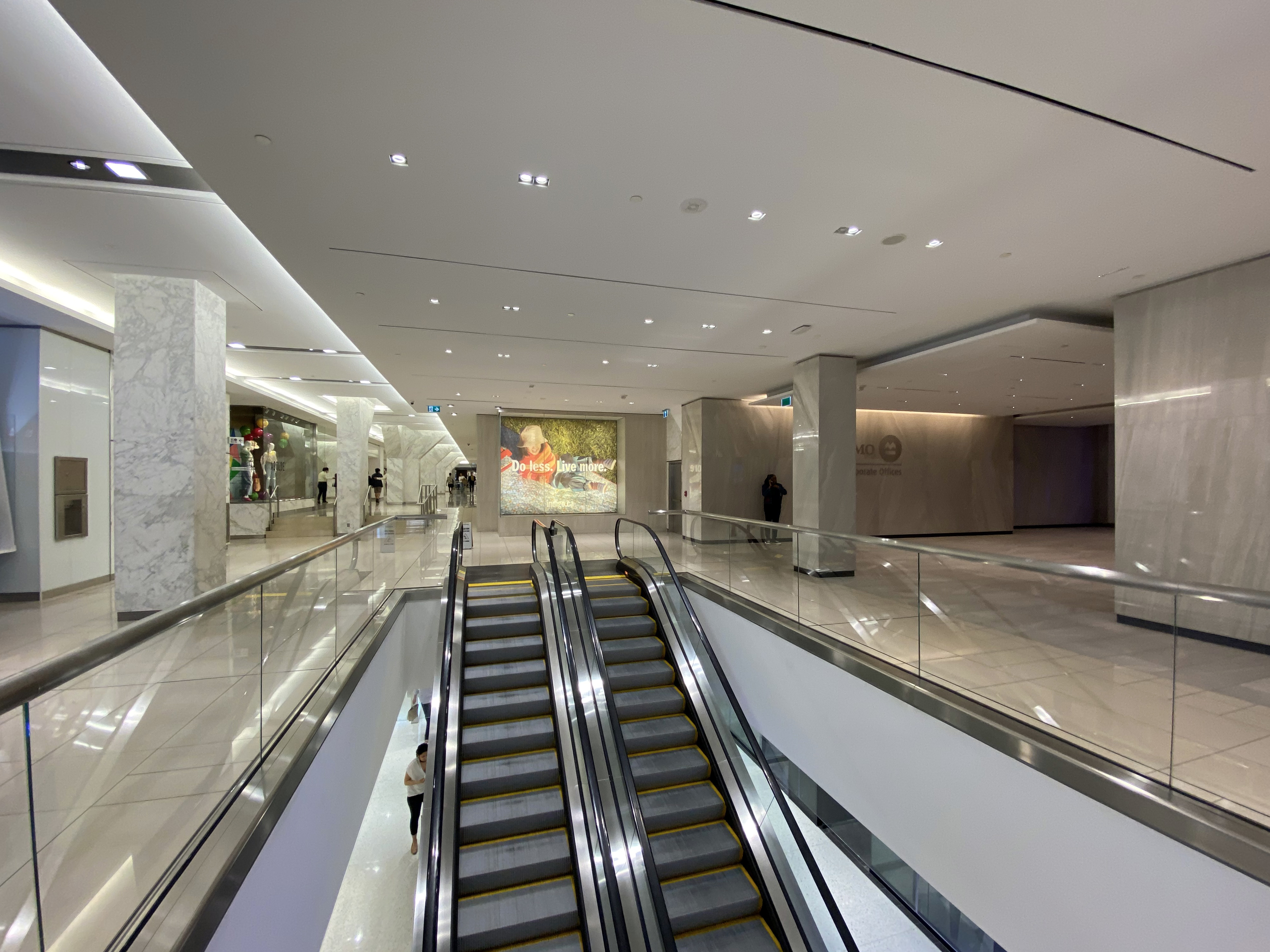
Manulife Centre Interior

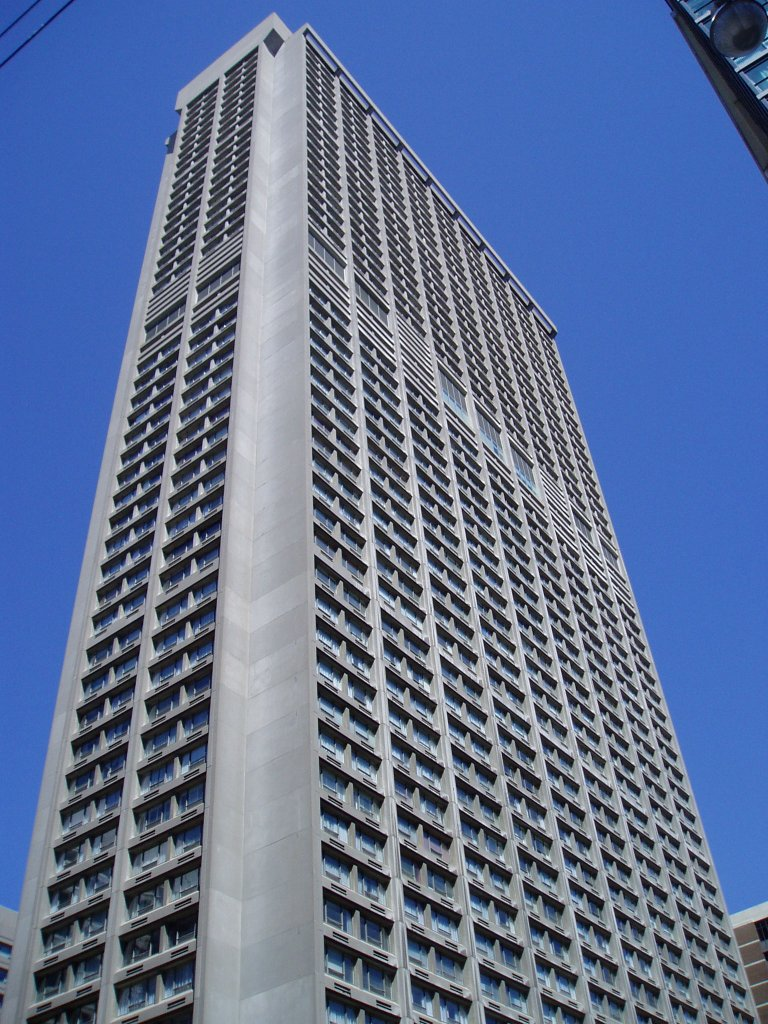
Residential tower

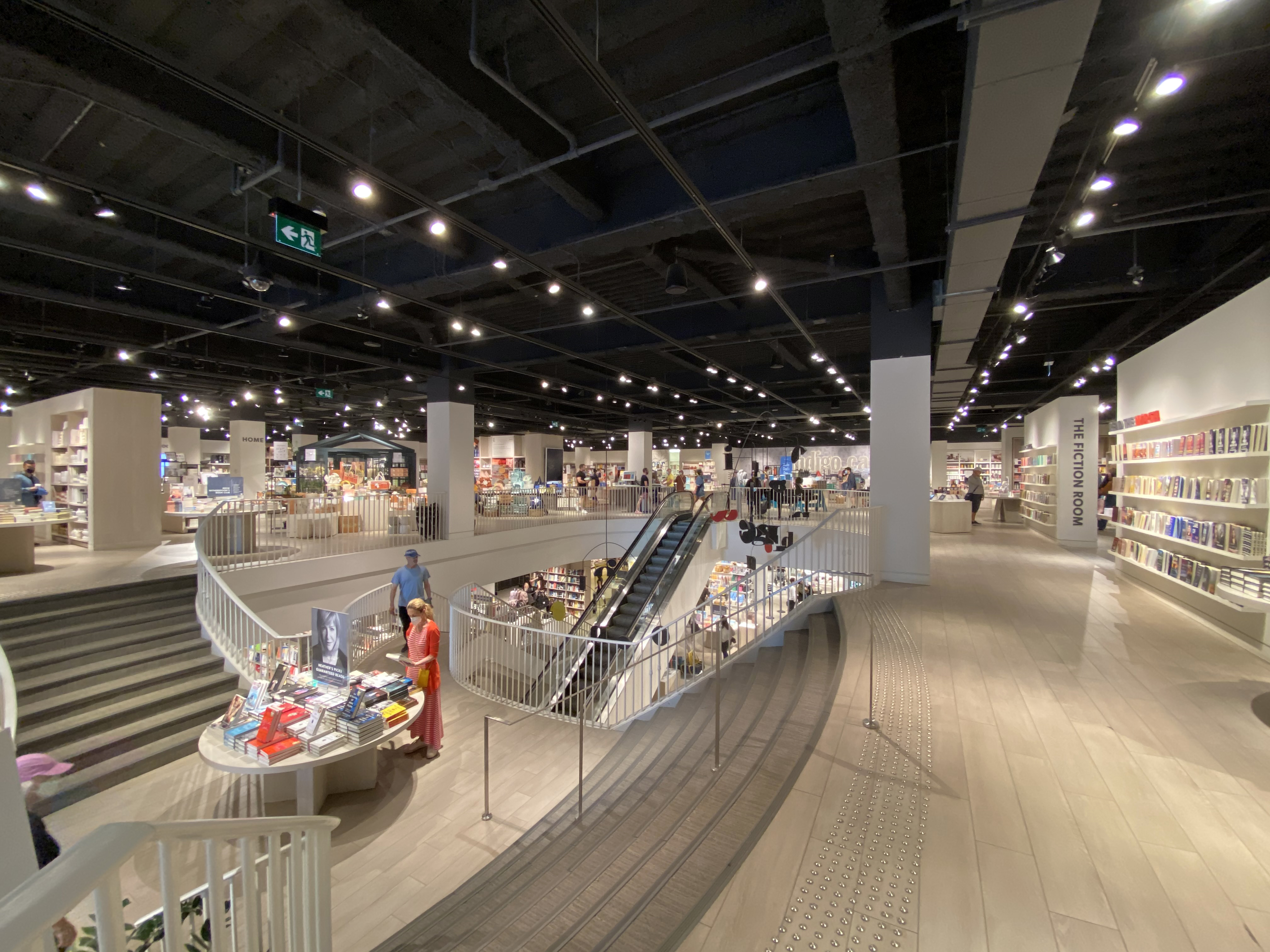
Indigo Books

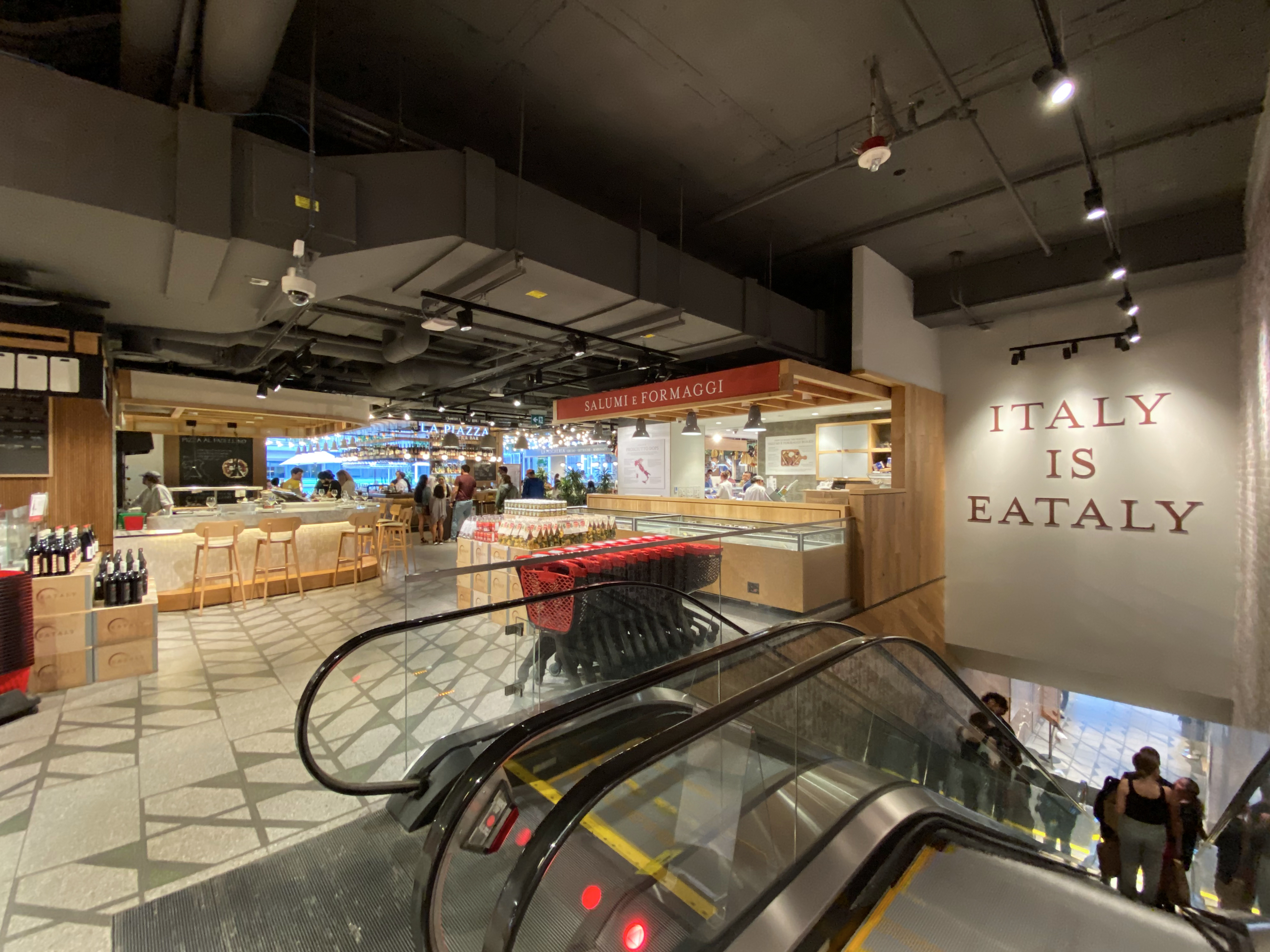
Eataly Toronto in Level 2

== See also ==
- List of tallest buildings in Toronto
- List of tallest buildings in Canada
