= Chinook station =

Light rail station in Calgary, Alberta, Canada

Chinook
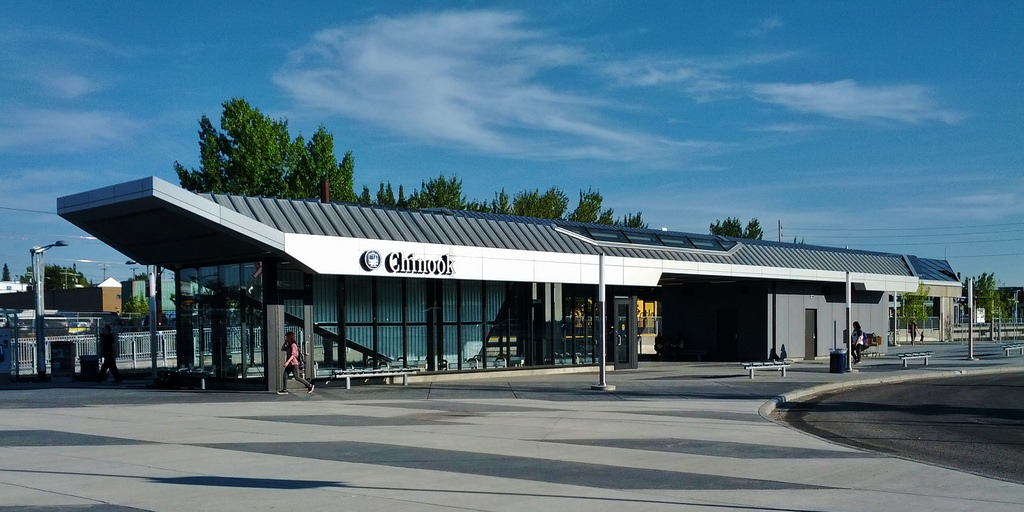

General information
- Location: 229 - 61 Avenue SW
- Coordinates: 50°59′50″N 114°03′57″W
- Transit authority: Calgary Transit
- Line: Red Line
- Platforms: Center-loading platform
- Tracks: 2
- Connections: 9 Dalhousie; 10 Macleod Trail; 36 Riverbend; 41 Lynnwood; 43 36 Street East; 81 Highfield; 148 Great Plains Industrial

Construction
- Structure type: At-grade
- Parking: 320 spaces
- Accessible: yes

History
- Opened: 1981; 45 years ago
- Rebuilt: 2013; 13 years ago

Services
Preceding station	Calgary Transit	Following station
39 Avenue toward Tuscany	Red Line	Heritage toward Somerset–Bridlewood
Location

Chinook station is a CTrain light rail station in Manchester Industrial (not to be confused with Manchester), Calgary, Alberta. The station opened on May 25, 1981, as part of the original South line on the Red Line.

The station is located on the exclusive LRT right of way (adjacent to CPR ROW) at 61 Avenue SW, 5.7 km (3.5 mi) south of the City Hall Interlocking. It is a three-block walk from the Chinook Centre shopping centre. A 320-space parking facility is also available for park and ride commuters.

The station consists of a center-loading platform with ramp access on the North end.

Chinook is the only Public Transit Station named after a privately owned and operated business (the shopping mall) as there are no other landmarks or communities in the area with that title when the station opened. Years later, Westbrook Station opened and naming scheme like this station.

As part of Calgary Transit's plan to operate four-car trains starting by the end of 2014, all three-car stations will need to be extended. Chinook Station however was completely rebuilt to a new design very similar to Somerset-Bridlewood, McKnight/Westwinds and Saddletowne Stations. Construction on the new bus terminal started in the summer of 2012. On January 14, 2013, the station and bus terminal closed for redevelopment and has re-opened on September 3, 2013. Bus service to Chinook passed through a temporary terminal at 3 Street SW with a bus shuttle connecting the terminal and the 39th Avenue CTrain station during the station's closure.

In 2005, the station registered an average transit of 12,400 boardings per weekday.

== Around the station ==
=== Major destinations ===
- Chinook Centre

=== Communities ===
Residential

- Manchester
- Meadowlark Park
- Windsor Park

Industrial

- Manchester Industrial

=== Major streets ===
- Centre Street S
- Glenmore Trail
- Macleod Trail

== Crime ==
During the month of March 2023, an underground drug operation along the Calgary C-Train system was disrupted. Officers seized the substances of fentanyl, methamphetamine, cocaine, morphine and Xanax. Multiple weapons such as 21 knives, two machetes, two hatchets, a handgun, and a can of bear spray were also seized by police. Forty people were arrested between multiple stations. Chinook along with Franklin, Southland, Marlborough, Heritage, Sunalta, Rundle, Whitehorn, Brentwood, Crowfoot, 8th Street SW, Anderson, Dalhousie, Westbrook Stations had arrests relating to the aforementioned drug trade.

In 2019, several incidents spanning years of unwanted sexual harassment and encounters from an individual that had been occurring at Chinook, 39 Avenue, and City Hall Stations, were reported to the media and police. These encounters targeted Hispanic and Filipino women in particular.

In September of 2021, a man asked two men not wearing a mask to mind their distance on a C-Train heading south from Heritage to Chinook. Then one of the men proceeded to aggressively cough in the man's face when getting off the train at Chinook Station, and then both men proceeded to threaten the man with following him to his house from the train. At that point, the man proceeded to alert Calgary Transit police officers, with peace officers telling the man "that’s the risk you take riding the train". The two men continued to follow the man towards Chinook Centre, all while verbally harassing him. The man was able to lose the two men inside the mall.

== Transit connections ==
Bus connections to this station as of 31 August, 2026:

- 9 - Dalhousie (North)
- 10 - Macleod Trail City Hall (North) / 10 Macleod Trail Southcentre (South)
- 36 - Riverbend (Counterclockwise)
- 41 - Lynnwood (Clockwise)
- 43 - 36 Street East Whitehorn (North)
- 81-N - Highfield (North) / 81-S - Kingsland (South)
- 148 - Great Plains Industrial (East)

== See also ==
- CTrain
- Red Line (Calgary)
- Chinook Centre
- Meadowlark Park, Calgary
