= Bretton's =

Bretton's was a high-end department store in Canada from 1985 to 1996.

The first two Bretton's stores were opened in Ottawa in 1985 by the parent company, Comark Incorporated. Comark (founded 1976), owned by the Brenninkmeijer family of the Netherlands, had owned many retail chains including Ricki's, Bootlegger, Clark Shoes, Collacut Luggage and D'Aillards. The family also owns the C&A chain of department stores in Europe.

Brettons sold clothing and cosmetics, in order to focus on high-margin, high-turn merchandise. Their stores were typically 60,000 square feet (6,000 m^{2}), smaller than a typical department store.

Comark aimed to establish 40 to 50 branches of Bretton's, but was blocked by existing department stores who generally had clauses in their shopping centre leases allowing them to approve or reject leases to other stores

== Locations ==
- Ottawa: Rideau Centre
- Ottawa: St. Laurent Shopping Centre
- Toronto: Manulife Centre
- Toronto: Sherway Gardens
- Vaughan: The Promenade
- Winnipeg: Polo Park Shopping Centre
- Calgary: Chinook Centre
- Calgary: Market Mall
- Edmonton: West Edmonton Mall
- Burnaby: Eaton Centre Metrotown
- Mississauga: Square One Shopping Centre

== See also ==
- List of Canadian department stores
