= MNP LLP =

Professional services firm in Canada

- Type: Limited Liability Partnership
- Industry: Professional Services
- Founded: Brandon, Manitoba, Canada (1958)
- Founder: Ron Meyers, Dave Norris, Don Penny
- Headquarters: Suite 2000, 330 5th Ave. S.W., Calgary, Alberta, Canada
- Number of locations: 128 offices (Sept 2024)
- Area served: Canada
- Key people: Jason Tuffs (CEO)
- Services: Assurance; Financial advisory Forensic accounting Management consulting Risk advisory Tax services
- Number of employees: 8,676 (Sept 2024)
- Website: mnp.ca

MNP (previously known as Meyers Norris Penny) is one of the largest full-service chartered professional accountancy and business advisory firms in Canada. MNP's head office is in Calgary, Alberta, and has offices from Vancouver Island to St. John's. MNP's 170 offices span across all 10 provinces, but it does not have locations in the territories of Yukon, Northwest Territories, and Nunavut. With 9,000+ employees, MNP is the third largest professional service firms in Canada by headcount.

== History ==
=== Early history ===
Sunset reflected on MNP Tower in Vancouver

The roots of MNP LLP date back to 1945, when Winnipeg-based Laird, Sprague & Co opened an office in Brandon, Manitoba. The Brandon office became independent in 1957 when the balance of Laird, Sprague joined Montreal's McDonald Currie & Co. (later merging with what is now known as PwC). Ron Meyers acquired full ownership of the Brandon office in 1958, and renamed the firm Meyers Dickens Norris Penny & Co. (MDNP) in 1969.

=== Mergers and acquisitions ===
2015: Draganjac Pressman, Etobicoke.

2016: Bennett McMahon Stillar, Brockville.

2017: WBLI LLP, Halifax and JMA Group, Oakville.

2018: Craig Keen Despatie Markell LLP, Cornwall, Ontario.

2020: Next Digital Inc., Edmonton, Alberta

2021: 26 Deloitte regional Canadian offices. Further expands presence in Gaspé, Woodstock, Sudbury, and St. John's.

2022: Acquired Quebec-based consulting firm Groupe Trigone, and further expands presence in Laval, Quebec City, North Shore Montreal, Oshawa, Wallaceburg, and Kelowna.

2023: Further expansion in Quebec (Berthierville and Shawinigan), Alberta (Calgary and Edmonton), British Columbia (2 acquisitions in Vancouver, Surrey and Prince George), Ontario (Sarnia), and Newfoundland and Labrador (St. John's office from PwC Canada).

2024: Various acquisitions in Quebec, and first acquisition in Prince Edward Island.

== Structure and subsidiaries ==
=== MNP Ltd. ===
MNP Ltd. is one of Canada’s largest consumer insolvency firms, established in 1996. As of 2016, the firm had over 65 Licensed Insolvency Trustees and more than 200 resident and satellite offices located in key urban and rural centres across Canada.

In 1996, after merging with Brandon, Manitoba-based BDO and Edmonton-based Miller, McClelland Limited, Meyers Norris Penny & Co. decided to create a subsidiary to incorporate their insolvency practice. On June 6, 2011, that subsidiary officially became MNP Ltd.

As a subsidiary of MNP LLP, MNP Ltd. offers consumer insolvency services including consumer proposals, personal bankruptcy and credit counselling as well as a range of bankruptcy alternatives like debt consolidation, orderly payment of debts, informal debt settlement, payday loans and credit extensions.

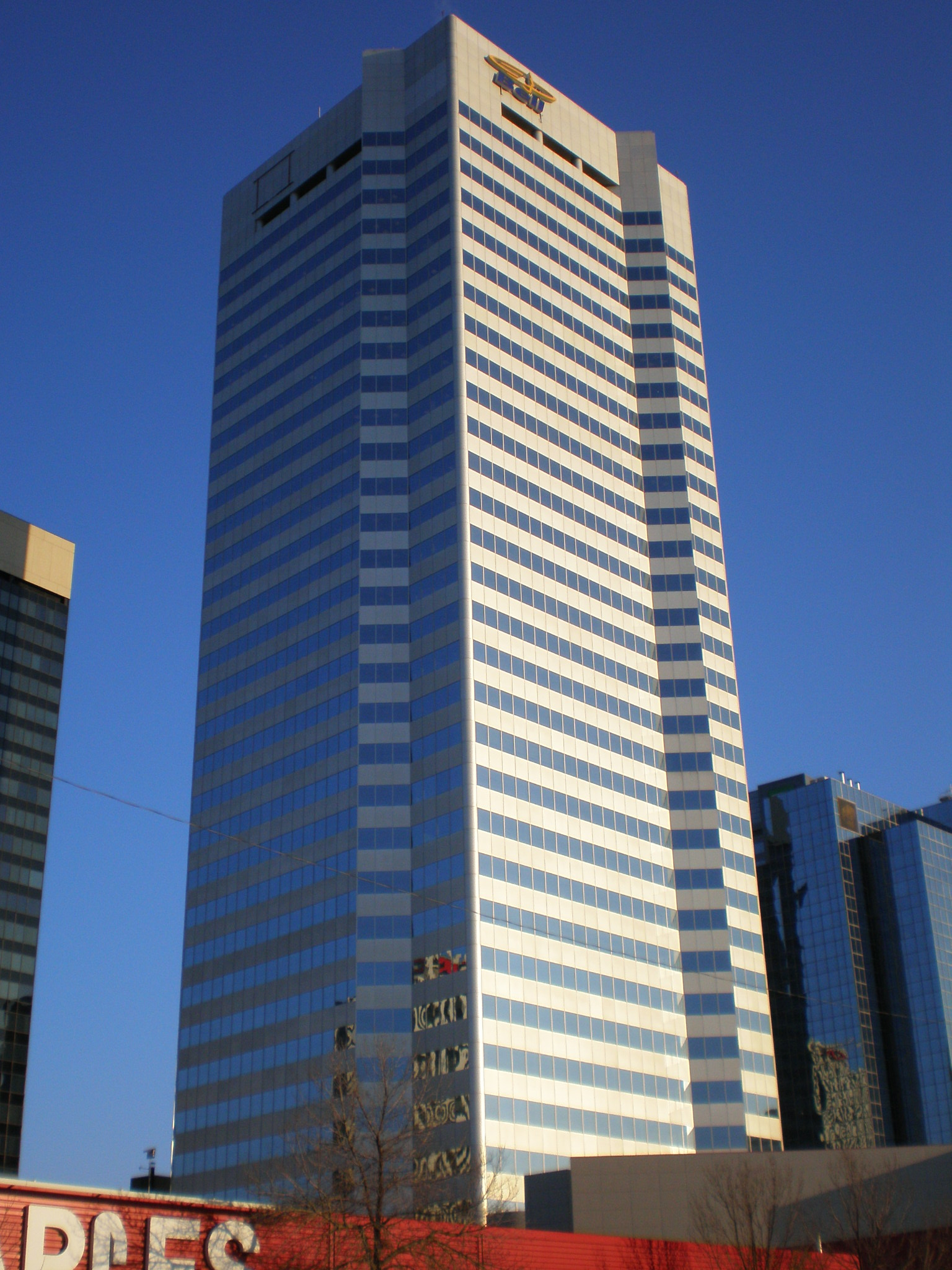
MNP Office Building at the Bell Tower in Downtown Edmonton

Its corporate recovery and restructuring services are broadly divided into three categories: Debtor Services (Business Review; Corporate Restructuring – Informal Turnaround; Corporate Restructuring – Formal Proposal to Creditors; Bankruptcy), Creditor Services (Business Review; Monitor Appointments; Interim Receiver; Receivership; Bankruptcy) and Other Services (Mediation; Trustee Under Dependant Adult Orders; Corporate Executer of Deceased Estates; Liquidator Under Business Corporation Acts).

MNP Ltd.’s Licensed Insolvency Trustees are licensed with the Office of the Superintendent of Bankruptcy Canada, a division of the Canadian Ministry of Innovation, Science and Economic Development and participate in various committees, marking centres and education components with the Canadian Association of Insolvency and Restructuring Professionals (CAIRP). Trustees have also sat on exam panels and had active roles as presidents and chairs of various provincial bodies and the national body of CAIRP.

=== MNP Corporate Finance Inc. ===
MNP Corporate Finance Inc. is a subsidiary of MNP LLP which offers investment banking and corporate finance services to Canadian businesses in the mid-market sector, with typical transaction value range between $3 million and $300 million. Services offered by MNPCF include: divestitures (sell-side M&A), acquisitions (buy-side M&A), financing (capital raising), transaction advisory services, and due diligence.

=== MNP and Praxity ===
In 2010 MNP joined Praxity, a global alliance of independent professional services firms. Praxity is a not-for-profit entity under Belgian law with its headquarters in London, England. Praxity consists of 65 participating firms, with a combined staff of over 56,280+ employees and 4,240+ partners and annual combined revenues of US$6.96 billion. Praxity firms have the capability, resource and scale to support clients ranging from small ambitious businesses to established global, listed organizations.

== Sports sponsorships ==
In the spring of 2022, MNP obtained the naming rights to the MNP Community & Sport Centre in Calgary.

== BC carbon tax grant investigation ==
On 8 April 2024, British Columbia Minister of Energy, Mines and Low Carbon Innovation, Josie Osborne, ordered an investigation into MNP's administration of two grant programs funded through the British Columbia Carbon Tax. This followed allegations that MNP had offered grant-writing services for programs it administered, in return for a 20% success fee. On 8 August 2024, the Auditor General of British Columbia released the investigation results and found no evidence of conflict of interest.

== See also ==
- Accounting networks and associations
- Professional services networks
