= 39 Avenue station (Calgary) =

Light rail station in Calgary, Alberta, Canada

39 Avenue
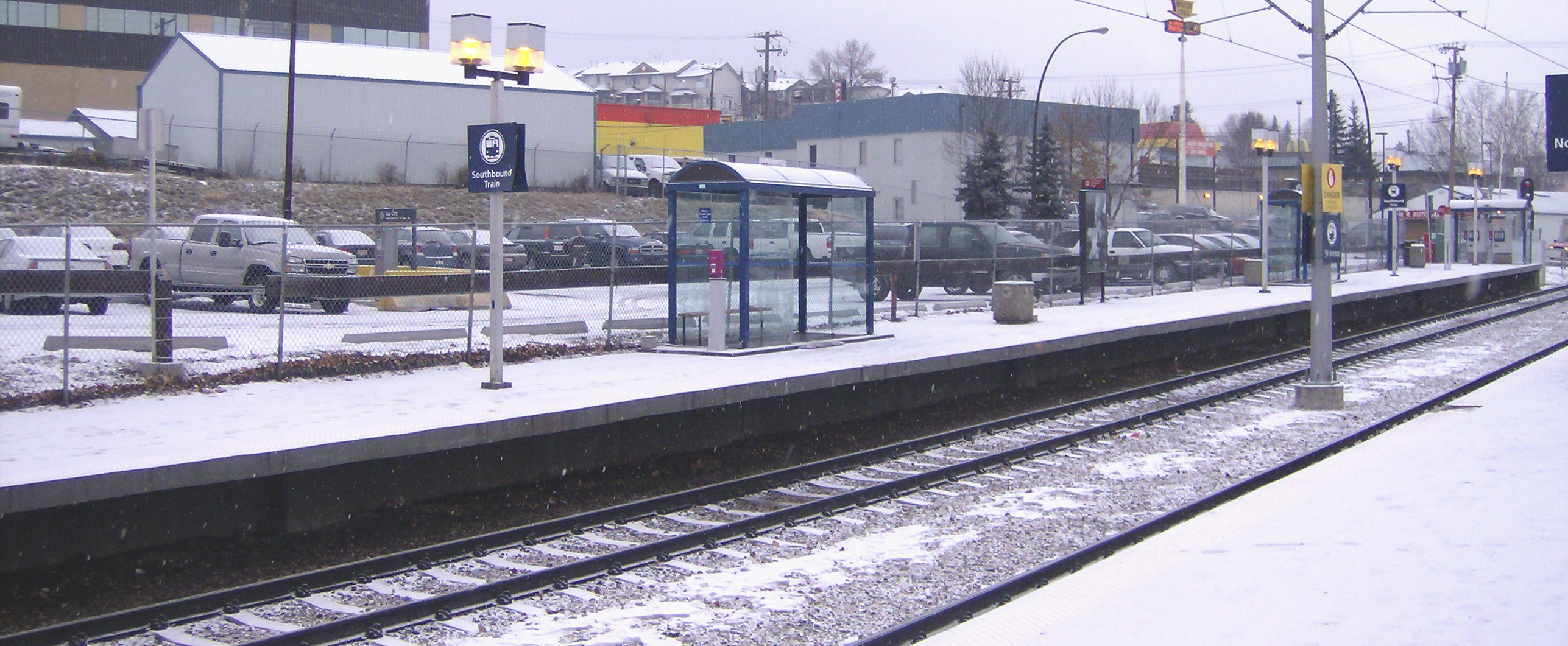

General information
- Other names: 39 Ave
- Location: 4115 - 1 Street SE
- Coordinates: 51°01′03″N 114°03′42″W
- Owner: Calgary Transit
- Platforms: Side-loading platforms
- Connections: 10 Macleod Trail; 15 Deerfoot Meadows; 147 Starfield Industrial

Construction
- Structure type: At-grade
- Accessible: yes

History
- Opened: 1981; 45 years ago
- Rebuilt: 2014; 12 years ago (minor)
- Former names: 42 Avenue S (1981–86)

Services
Preceding station	Calgary Transit	Following station
Erlton/Stampede toward Tuscany	Red Line	Chinook toward Somerset–Bridlewood
Location

39 Avenue station (usually shortened to 39 Ave) is a Calgary CTrain LRT station on the south leg of the Red Line, between Erlton/Stampede station southbound and Chinook station northbound. The station is located inside of the community of Manchester, a residential community in Calgary, Alberta. 39 Avenue Station opened on May 25, 1981, as part of the original South line. The station is located on the exclusive LRT right of way 3.4 km (2.1 mi) south of the City Hall Interlocking, at 39 Avenue SE, just east of Macleod Trail.

It is located near the north end of a short tunnel that passes under 42nd Avenue. 229 parking spaces are available at the station on both sides. The station consists of two side-loading platforms and is completely at grade. 39 Avenue Station is the most exposed station to the elements as there is no canopy at all, unlike every other LRT station.

Formerly called 42 Avenue because 42 Avenue is a major commercial roadway in the area. In 1986, the station was renamed 39 Avenue to better indicate where it is located.

Calgary Transit is planning to operate four-car trains by the end of 2014. As a result, all three-car platforms are being extended. Construction work to extend the platform southwards started in April 2014 and finished in July 2014.

In 2005, the station registered an average transit volume of 3,600 boardings per weekday.

== Around the station ==
=== Major destinations ===
- Abandoned Lindsay Mansion Ruins
- Burnsland Cemetery

=== Communities ===
Residential

- Elboya
- Manchester
- Parkhill

Industrial

- Burns Industrial
- Manchester Industrial

== Crime ==
A woman in her late 20s was taken to hospital shortly after 6 PM on June 17, 2019, after a stabbing happened at the 39 Avenue Station platform.

In 2019, several incidents spanning years of unwanted sexual harassment and encounters from an individual that had been occurring at Chinook, 39 Avenue, and City Hall Station, were reported to the media and police. These encounters targeted Hispanic and Filipino women in particular.

A stabbing took place on the morning of Thursday December 23, 2021, at around 7 AM at the 39 Avenue LRT Station, with a man being rushed to hospital in serious condition.

On April 6, 2025, a hit-and-run occurred at the railway crossing adjacent to 39 Avenue Station, injuring 1 and causing train delays to the Red Line.

On June 6, 2025, an unknown man boarded a southbound CTrain at either Erlton/Stampede or 39 Avenue Station, then shortly after proceeding to touch a woman in a sexual manner without consent. The suspect would get off the train at Heritage Station.

== Transit connections ==
Bus connections to the station as of 31 August, 2026

- 10 - Macleod Trail City Hall / 10 - Macleod Trail Southcentre
- 15 - Southland
- 147 - Starfield Industrial

== See also ==
- CTrain
- Red Line (Calgary)
- Chinook station
- Manchester, Calgary
- Parkhill, Calgary
