= Chinook Centre =

Shopping centre in Calgary, Alberta

CF Chinook Centre
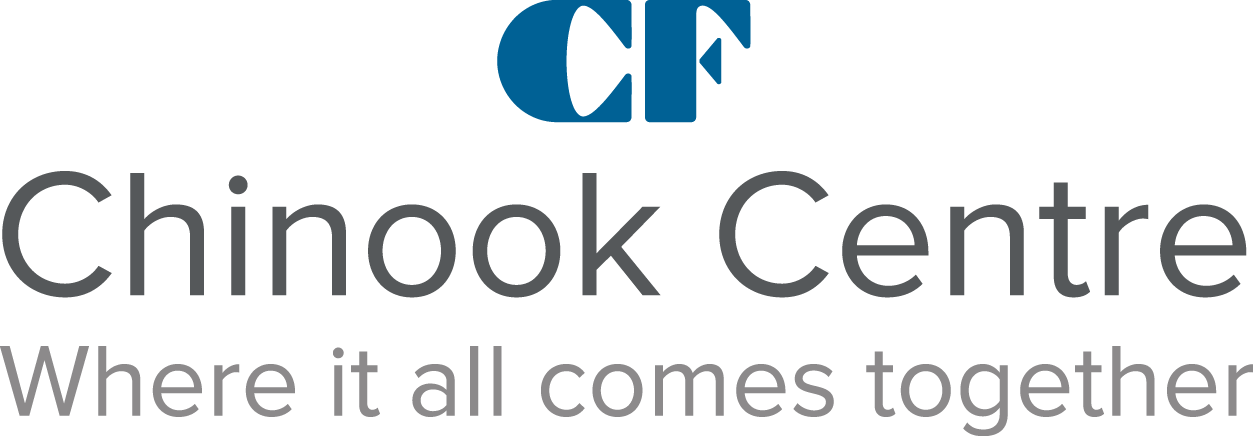

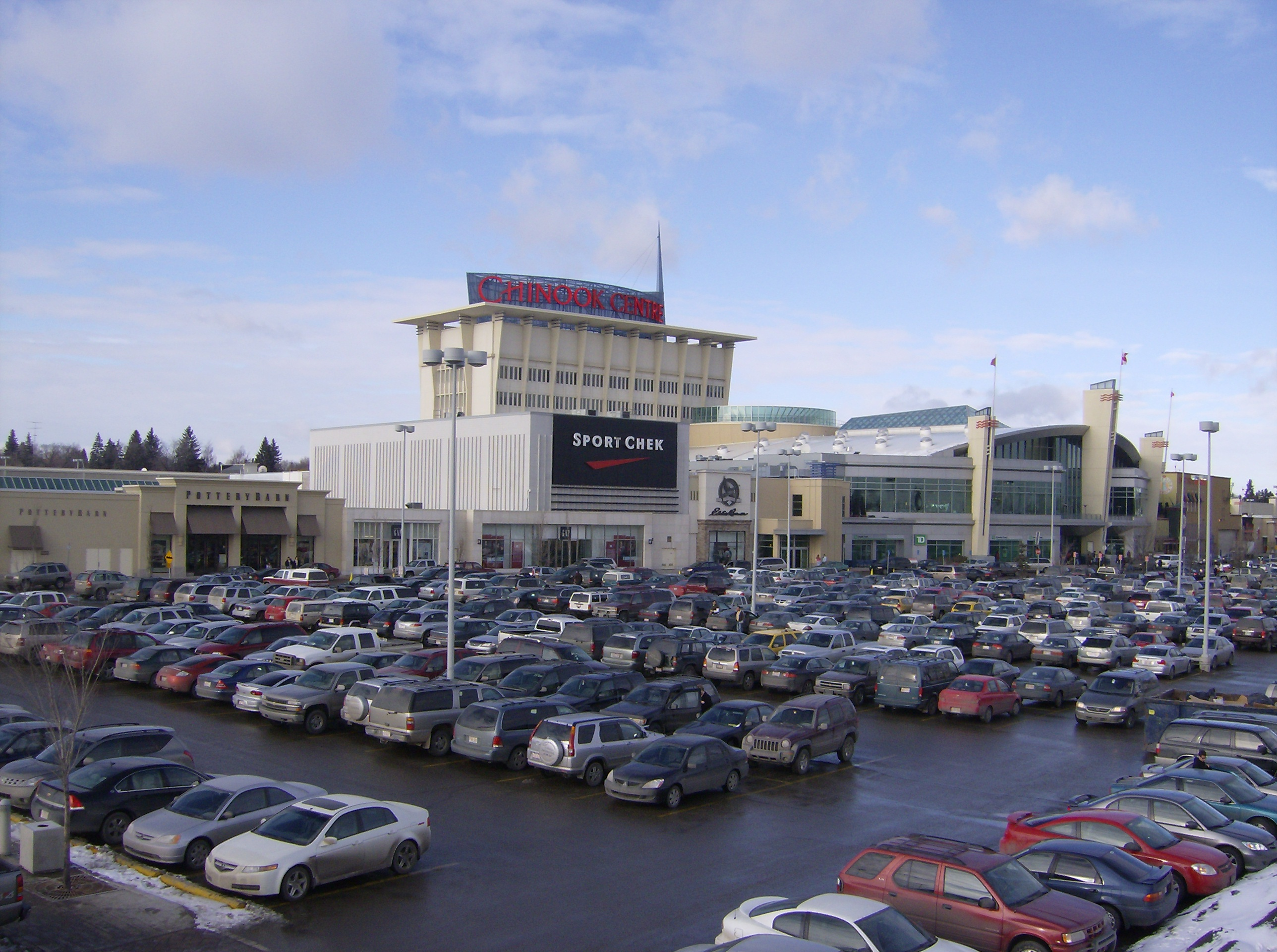
- Chinook Centre in 2007
- Coordinates: 50°59′54″N 114°04′26″W
- Address: 6455 Macleod Trail SW, Calgary, Alberta, Canada, T2H 0K8
- Opened: August 16, 1960; 66 years ago
- Manager: Cadillac Fairview
- Owner: Cadillac Fairview
- Num. of stores: 250
- Num. of anchor tenants: 2
- Floor area: 1,377,768 square feet (127,998.8 m^{2})
- Floors: 2
- Public transit: Chinook station
- Website: shops.cadillacfairview.com/property/cf-chinook-centre

Chinook Centre (formally branded as "CF Chinook Centre") is the largest shopping mall in Calgary, Alberta, Canada. It is located near the geographic centre of the city on Macleod Trail, north of Glenmore Trail about 5 km (3.1 mi) south of downtown, and three blocks west of the Chinook CTrain station. The mall is operated by Cadillac Fairview.

CF Chinook Centre covers 1,377,768 square feet (127,998.8 m^{2}) of space, and includes 250 stores and restaurants. As the largest shopping destination in Calgary, it offers a range of mid-priced retailers as well as higher-end offerings in a luxury wing. Junior anchors include Sport Chek, H&M, and Chapters.

Chinook Centre also operated a Nordstrom store until its closure in 2023.

The centre also includes a professional tower, bowling alley, 900-seat Dining Hall, and the 16-screen Scotiabank Theatre Chinook.

The focal point of the mall is a four-storey-high rotunda, including a time capsule.

== History ==
Logo used until October 2015

In 1960, with Calgary's population and city limits rapidly expanding, the first section of Chinook Centre was opened August 16 on the site of the Chinook Drive-In Theatre and the adjacent Skyline drive-in and driving range. Designed as an open-air complex, the mall was anchored by Woodward's, Holt Renfrew, a bowling alley, and a branch of the Calgary Public Library.

=== 1970s Merger ===
In 1963, a separate mall, Southridge, was opened across the street from Chinook. Built to be a competing centre with Sears and approximately 30 other stores, Southridge operated separately until 1974, when the company that owned Southridge bought out Chinook, and an expansion was built to bridge the centres together. The new, larger mall was renamed Chinook Ridge Shopping Centre, and included a major enclosed parking structure, a movie theatre, an office tower, and a food court.

Time capsule's cover plate at the four-storey rotunda

In the 1980s, a two-storey wing of specialty retailers was added leading to a new anchor store (fashion retailer Bretton's, since closed) and a new food court. This expansion brought the mall's store count to approximately 300.

A popular feature of the mall was an indoor merry-go-round, which was initially located outside the entrance to The Bay; following the 2000s renovation (see below), the attraction was relocated to the expanded food court. The construction of a pedestrian bridge from the food court required the removal of the carousel in 2018, when it was relocated to Spruce Meadows; it was later used in filming of an episode of the 2023 TV series The Last of Us.

=== 2000 overhaul ===
In the late 1990s, Chinook Centre underwent a $300 million, three-year renovation. The complex was completely rebuilt in three phases, and added new stores for Sears, The Bay and Zellers, as well as the south parkade and theatre complex. The former Chinook Movie Theatre location, which had closed in the early 1990s and converted into a large gaming arcade, became a much-expanded food hall. The move to larger format retailers reduced the number of stores to approximately 200. This re-merchandising program was unkind to smaller, locally owned businesses who were squeezed out by the 'upscaling' of the property. Some relocated to strip malls located near Chinook for a time.

=== 2010 expansion ===
On September 29, 2010, a major 180,000-square-foot (17,000 m^{2}) 2-level expansion was opened. The new wing added approximately 60 new retailers, many of which were new to the Calgary market or considered high-end luxury brand stores. The expansion increased the number of retailers to 250, and added two levels of underground parking.

=== Pedestrian and transit access ===
Until the late 2010s, pedestrian access to the mall from east of Macleod Trail was facilitated by way of a thin pedestrian bridge, an underground tunnel, and an at-grade crosswalk. Use of these three options grew after the City's CTrain station was built approximately five blocks east of the mall (a location dictated by the placement of existing rail lines). Concerns over pedestrian safety resulted in a large pedestrian bridge being constructed in the late 2010s; running more than a block, it connects the Dining Hall on the second level to 61st Avenue, which in turn takes pedestrians to the CTrain station. In late 2018, the pedestrian tunnel was closed due to safety concerns, and the new bridge allowed the removal of the at-grade crosswalk at Macleod and 61st.

== List of anchor stores ==
Name	No. of floors	Year opened	Year closed	Notes
Bretton's				
Hudson's Bay	2	1993	2025	Replaced Woodward's
Nordstrom	2	2014	2023	First Canadian location, replaced Sears Canada
Saks Fifth Avenue	2	2018	2025	Replaced Target
Scotiabank Theatre		2001	—N/a	Previously named Paramount Theatre
Sears Canada	2	1963	2012	
Target Canada	2	2013	2015	Replaced Zellers
Woodward's		1960	1993	
Zellers	2	1993	2012	Replaced Woodward's

== Gallery ==
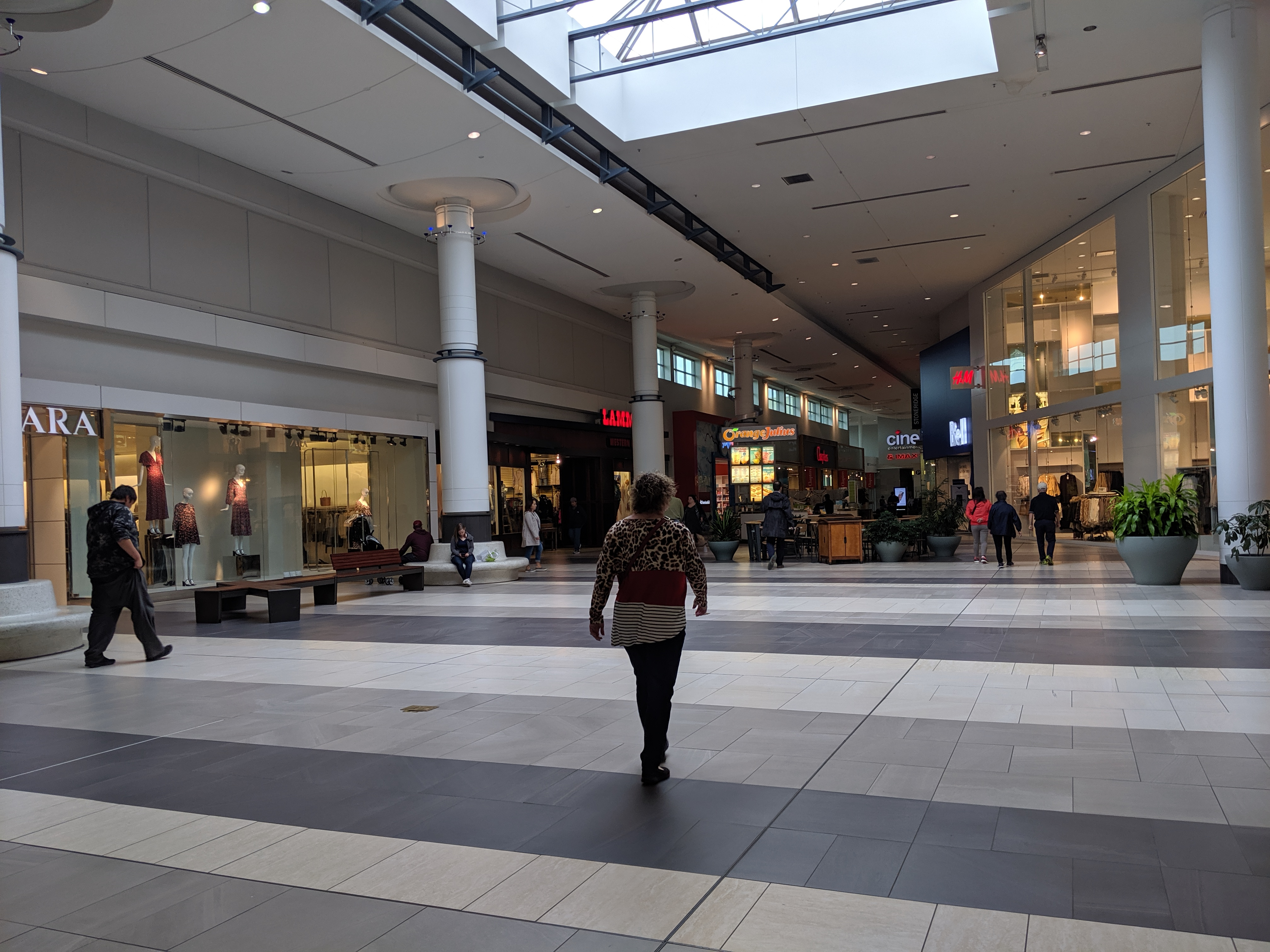
The mall on September 9, 2019.

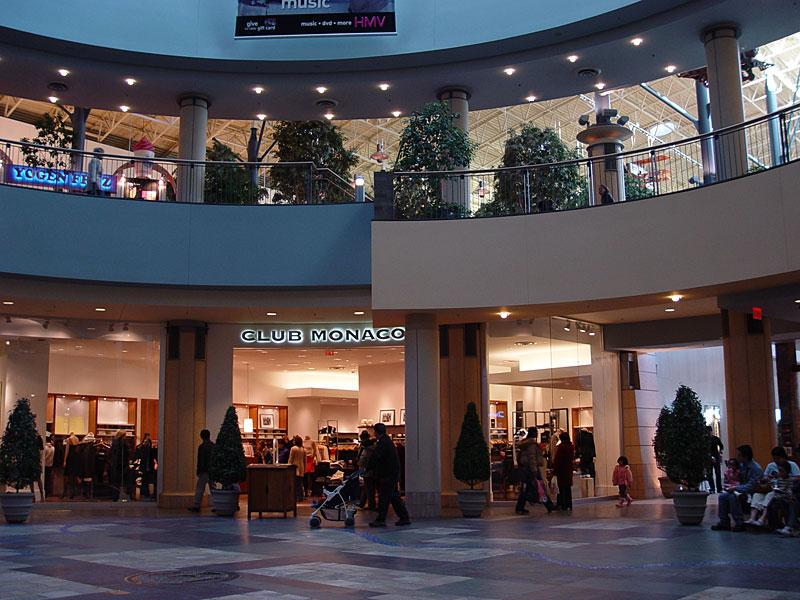
The centre court and food court of Chinook Centre before renovations from the lower level on July 23, 2006.

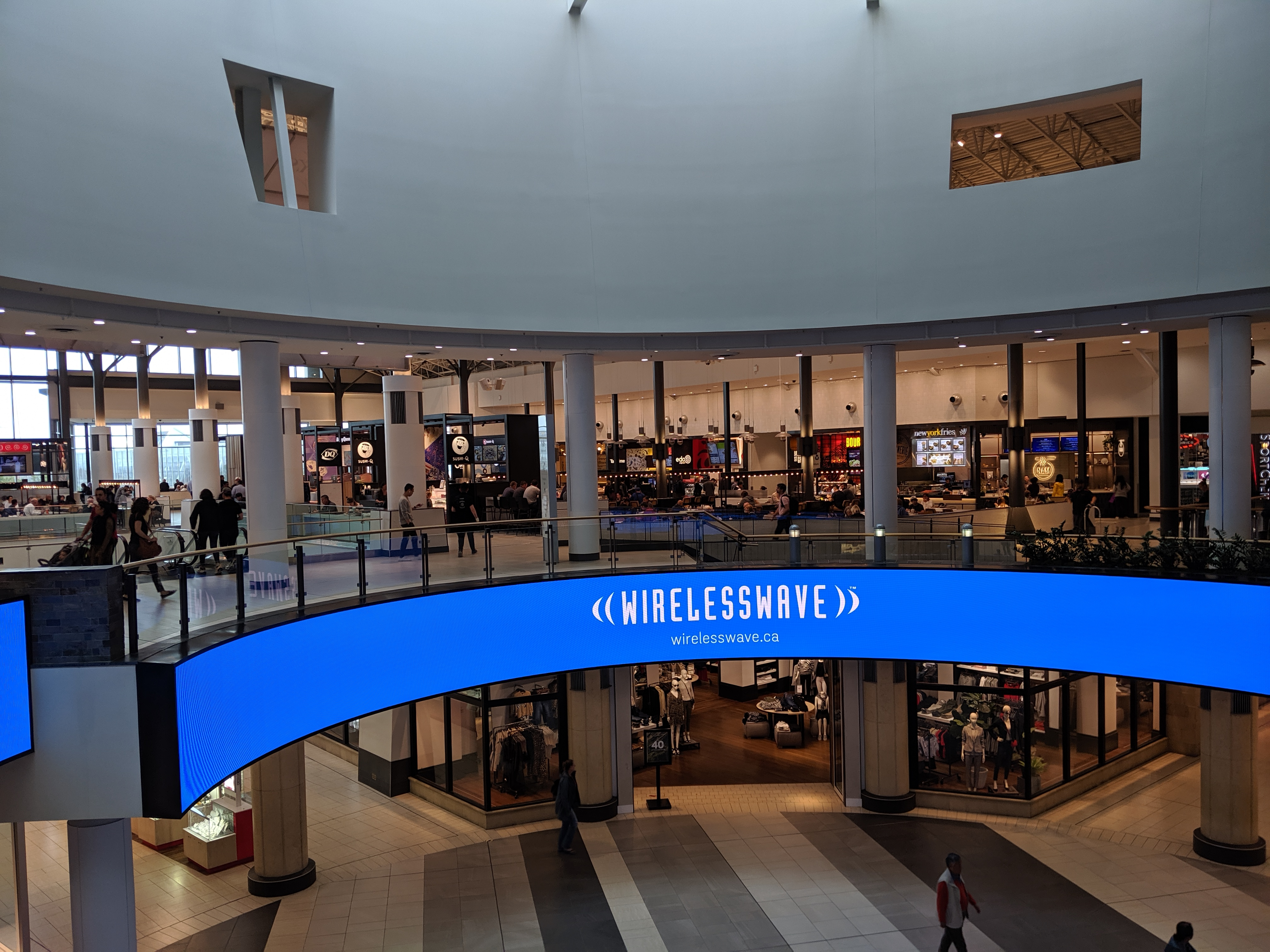
The centre court and food court 13 years later on September 9, 2019, after renovations.

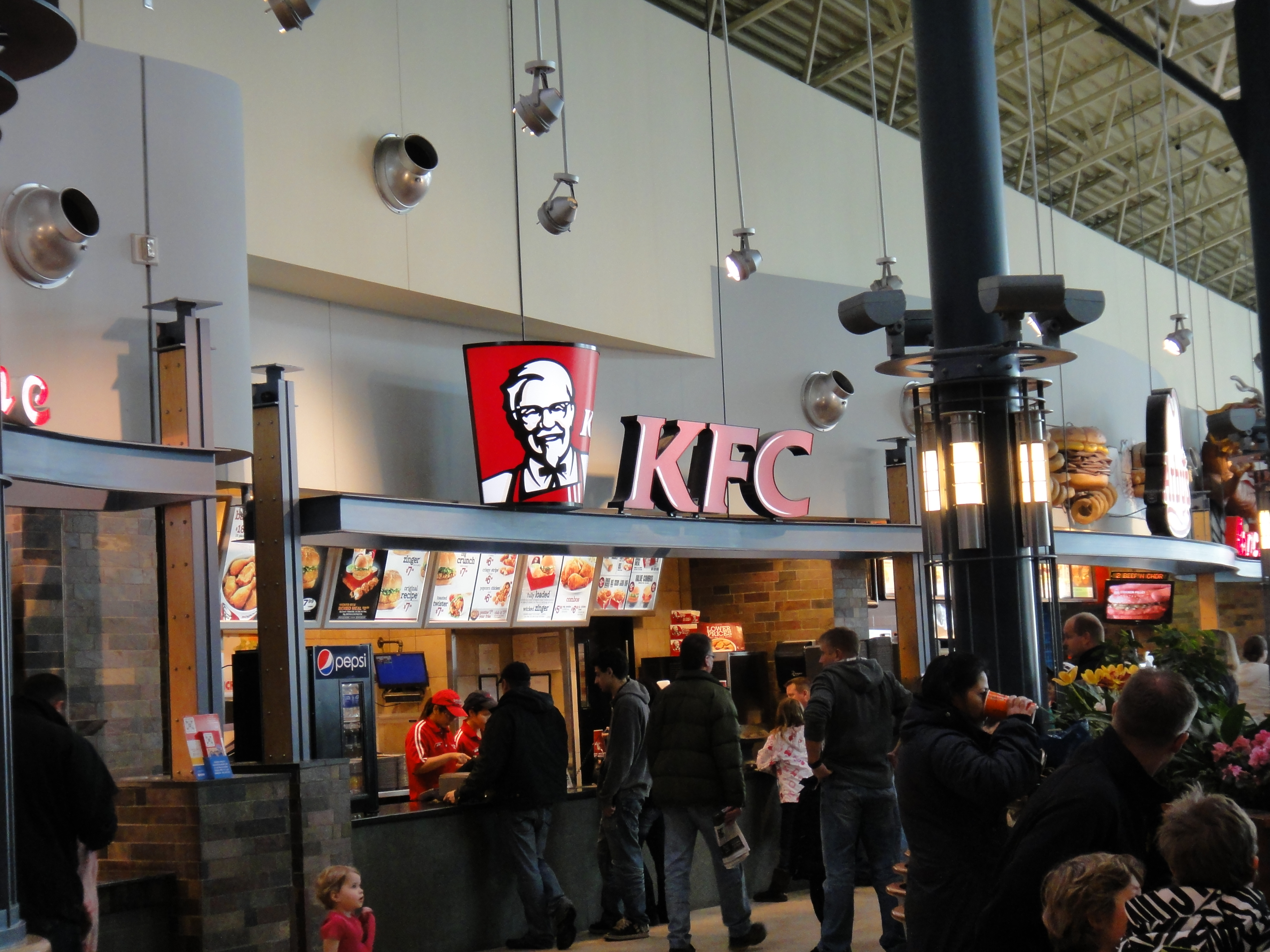
The KFC at Chinook Centre on April 2, 2011 before renovations.

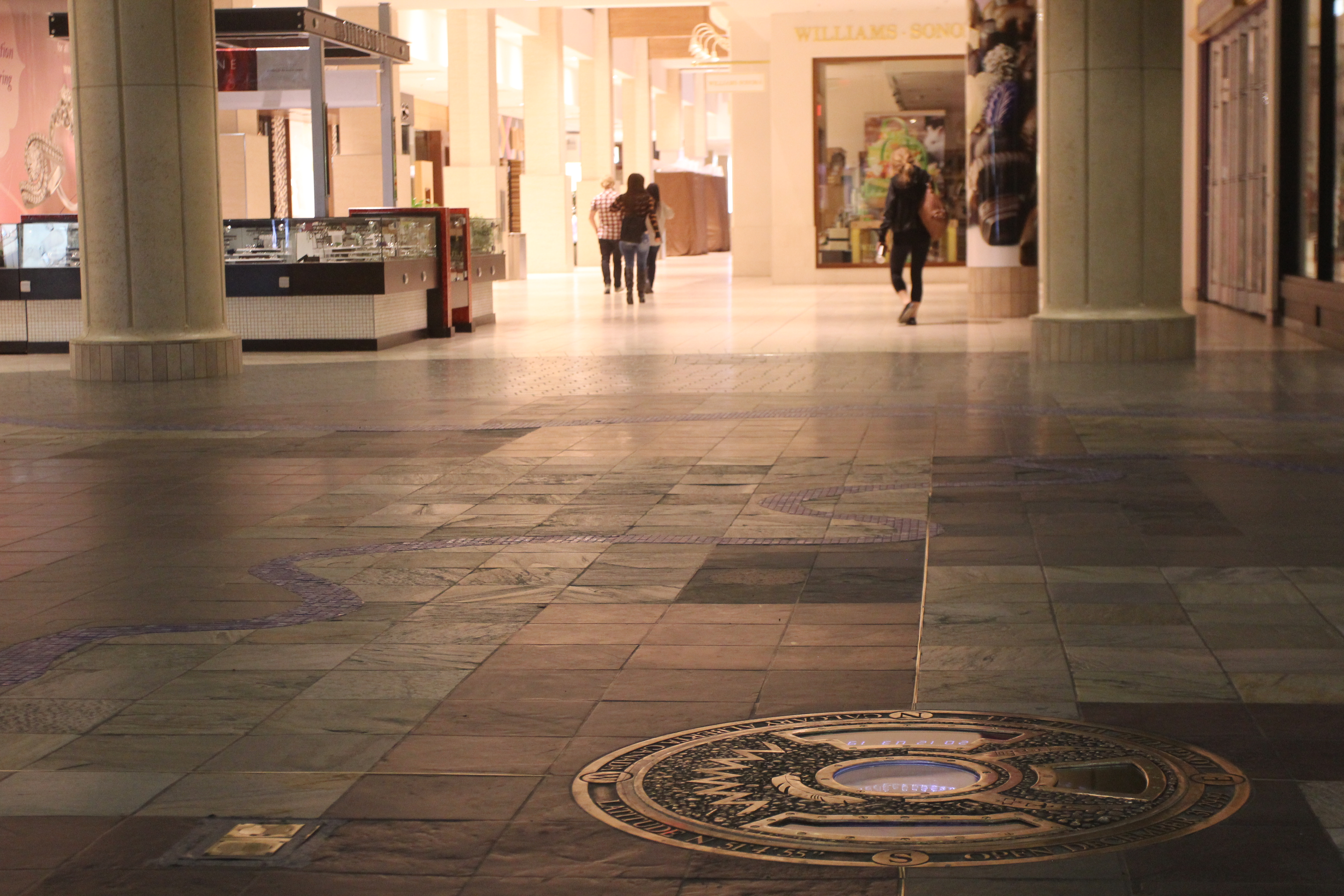
The new upgraded time capsule installed on March 19, 2012.
Location in Calgary

== See also ==
- List of largest shopping malls in Canada
- List of shopping malls in Canada
