= Erlton, Calgary =

Erlton
- Neighbourhood
- Location of Erlton in Calgary
- Coordinates: 51°01′43″N 114°03′40″W
- Country: Canada
- Province: Alberta
- City: Calgary
- Quadrant: SW
- Ward: Calgary City Council #Ward 8
- Established: 1906

Government
  - Mayor: Jeromy Farkas
  - Administrative body: Calgary City Council
  - Councillor: Nathaniel Schmidt (Independent)
- Elevation: 1,060 m (3,480 ft)

Population (2012)
  - Total: 1,234
  - Average Income (2006): $67,698
- Website: Erlton Community Association

Erlton is an inner city residential neighbourhood in the southwest quadrant of Calgary, Alberta. It is bounded by the Elbow River to the north and west, by Spiller Road to the east and by Mission Road to the south. Macleod Trail bisects the neighbourhood from north to south. The neighbourhood is represented by the Erlton Community Association.

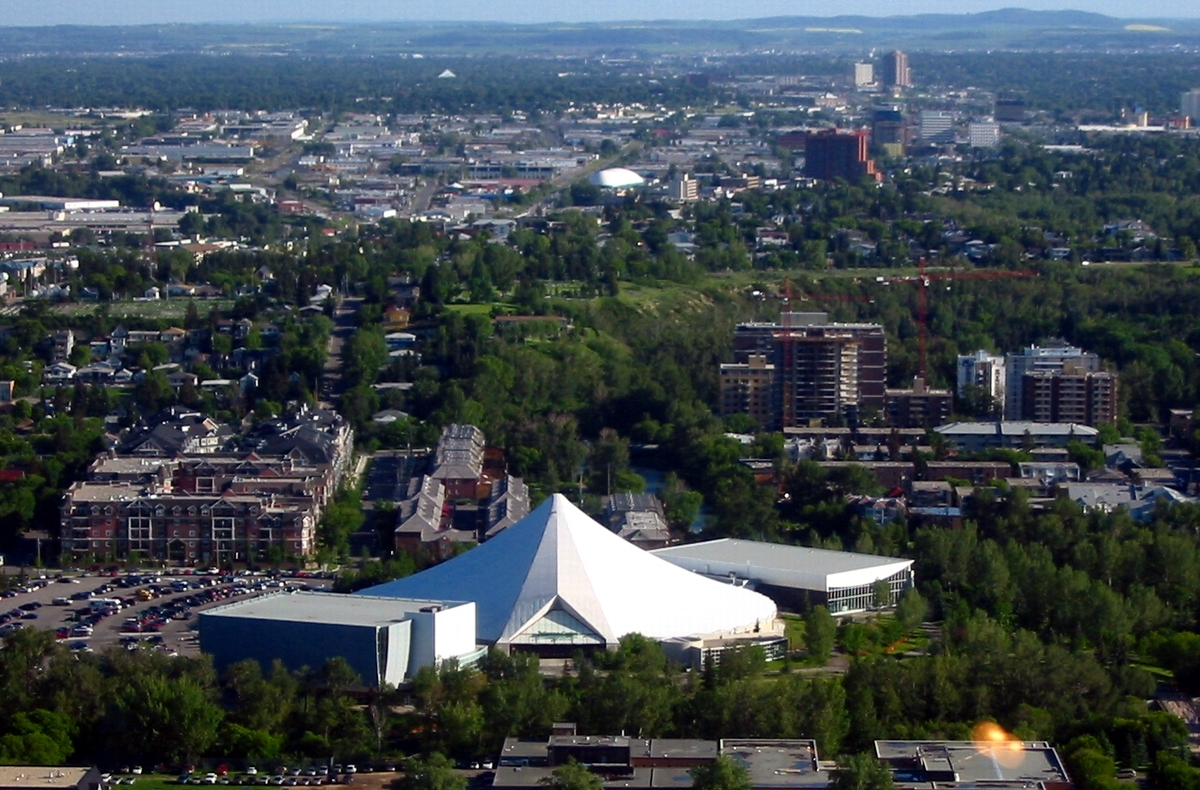
MNP Community & Sport Centre and the neighbourhood of Erlton

Erlton was established in 1906. It is represented in the Calgary City Council by the Ward 8 councillor.

The community is served by the Erlton/Stampede station of the C-Train LRT system. The MNP Community & Sport Centre and Lindsay Park border the community to the north, and the Stampede Grounds are located immediately northwest.

== Demographics ==
In the City of Calgary's 2012 municipal census, Erlton had a population of 1,234 living in 742 dwellings, a 0.2% increase from its 2011 population of 1,231. With a land area of 0.5 km^{2} (0.19 sq mi), it had a population density of 2,470/km^{2} (6,400/sq mi) in 2012.

Residents in this community had a median household income of $67,698 in 2000, and there were 20.8% low income residents living in the neighbourhood. A proportion of 70.3% of the buildings were condominiums or apartments, and 42% of the housing was used for renting.

== Crime ==
Crime Data
Year	Crime Rate (/100 pop.)
2018	5.2
2019	6.4
2020	4.1
2021	4.3
2022	3.4
2023	3.0

== See also ==
- List of neighbourhoods in Calgary
