= MNP Community & Sport Centre =

Multi-sport complex in Calgary

- Interactive map of MNP Community & Sport Centre
- Location: 2225 Macleod Trail South, Calgary, Alberta, Canada
- Coordinates: 51°02′04″N 114°03′48″W
- Owner: City of Calgary, Canada
- Operator: Lindsay Park Sports Society

Construction
- Opened: September 1983
- Renovated: 2004 two new annexes built: Dr.Neville Lindsay Building and Calgary Foundation Training pool. 2010-2011 roof replacement and facility upgrades
- Cost: $24.7 million, $44.5 million (renovation)
- Architect: Paul Merrick of Chandler Kennedy Architectural Group
- Structural engineers: Geiger Berger Associates (original roof); Geiger Engineers (new roof)
- General contractor: Pigott Construction Western

Tenants
- Total Cardiology; Lifemark Physiotherapy; Jugo Juice; Good Earth

MNP Community & Sport Centre, formerly known as the Repsol Sport Centre, Talisman Centre and Lindsay Park Sports Centre, is a multi-sports complex in Calgary, Alberta, Canada.

MNP Community & Sport Centre operates under a dual mandate as directed by The City of Calgary to support both members and sport partner athletes:

- To provide training and competition facilities and services for the development of Calgary's high performance athletes in their respective dryland and aquatic sports.
- To provide facilities, programs and services for the wellness and recreational sporting needs of the citizens of Calgary.

The complex attracts over 1.8 million visitors annually.

The complex itself is run by the non-profit Lindsay Park Sports Society, a 13-member board and civic partner of the City of Calgary.

== Original structure ==
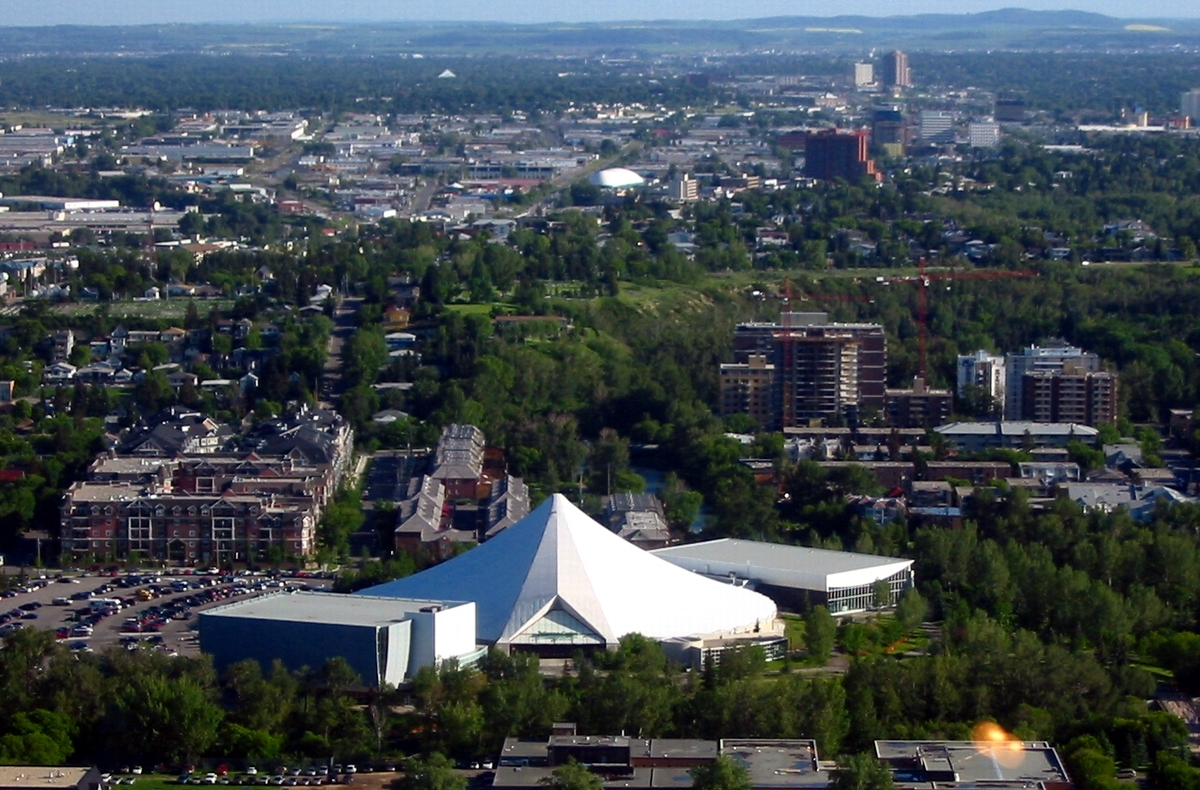
MNP Community & Sport Centre and Elbow Valley

The structure itself was built in 1983 for the Western Canada Summer Games. The white inverted v-shaped roof, comprises a steel arch spine with a concrete perimeter. The skin of the roof is a Teflon-coated fibreglass outer skin, that achieves 4% transparency reducing the need for artificial light. The original project cost was $24.7 million. The original facility was opened as 130,000 square feet (12,000 m^{2}) area.

The facility was built at the same time as the Scotiabank Saddledome which is just across Macleod Trail. The project site (between the neighbourhood of Mission and Erlton) was chosen because of easy access to the C-Train that began operation in 1981, and access to the Elbow River pathway.

MNP Community & Sport Centre location in Calgary

== Major expansion in 2003-2004 ==
In 2004 Talisman Centre completed a $24 million expansion. The new fitness centre was named the Dr. Neville Lindsay Sport Wellness Centre to honour Calgary's first doctor, who owned the land upon which the facility sits. The new aquatic centre was named The Calgary Foundation Aquaplex, to recognize and celebrate the contributions of The Calgary Foundation through a major gift from an anonymous donor.

The facility holds sporting events both professional and amateur, and all facilities are open to the public. MNP Community & Sport Centre hosts many regional, national and international competitions in water polo, synchronized swimming, swimming, diving, track, basketball and other sports.

== Ongoing expansions ==
The MNP Community & Sport Centre has had a few controversies over the years. One was surveillance cameras in sensitive areas, such as change rooms. The presence of cameras throughout the facility was included in the privacy policy. The complex also came under fire when the naming rights were sold to Talisman Energy, some lobby groups claim the oil company is responsible for funding atrocities in Sudan when it primarily did business in the country. These controversies never made an impact on attendance or operations.

Other nearby sports facilities include the Stampede Corral, Scotiabank Saddledome, Stampede Grandstand, and Shaw Millennium Park.

== 2013-2014 facility improvements ==
On June 20, 2013, Talisman Centre was forced to evacuate and close the entire facility when one of the worst natural disasters in Alberta's history, the June Flood, hit Calgary.

The flood caused close to $10 million in damages including restoration, repairs and new equipment brought in to replace flood-infected air ducts, machinery, and electrical equipment. Administrative files and other program gear was damaged, and numerous fitness machines broke down due the lack of air flow during the closure.

New lower level activity spaces added during the improvements included the Multi-Sport 1 Studio, Multi-Sport 2 Studio, and Strength & Balance (Yoga & Pilates) Studio.

== Roof replacement ==
The original tensile roof on the MNP Community & Sport Centre was constructed in 1983 and remained in service longer than anticipated. After a two-year review regarding options for the existing roof, City Council approved funding for a new-and-improved roof system. While maintaining the original roof's profile, the new roof system made use of new materials such as Nanogel aerogel thus providing better insulation and energy efficiency while also allowing a significant amount of light to filter into the building's interior.

In March 2010, the tented portion of the facility was closed for the replacement of its roof and many facility upgrades. The $44.5-million project was a joint initiative between the City of Calgary, the government of Canada and Talisman Energy. The new roof was completed in 2011 and was expected to last 30-plus years.

== Name changes ==
The facility was named the Lindsay Park Sports Centre when built.

In March 2002 the facility was renamed the Talisman Centre after the City of Calgary sold the naming rights to Talisman Energy for 10 million dollars for 20 years.

Talisman was bought by Repsol in 2016, after which the facility's name was changed to the Repsol Sport Centre.

When Repsol's naming sponsorship agreement expired in spring of 2022, MNP LLP became the naming sponsor, and the facility was renamed the MNP Community & Sport Centre.

== Expansion ==
The facility is undergoing an expansion known as the Leisure Expansion Aquatics Project (LEAP), a redevelopment initiative to enhance its aquatic and recreational amenities. The project includes the addition of features such as a lazy river, water slides, and a wading pool, as well as upgrades to existing facilities and infrastructure.

The expansion represents an investment of approximately $87.5 million, with funding provided by the City of Calgary, the Government of Alberta, and other partners. Construction began in 2024 and is expected to be completed by 2027.

== Operations ==
In 2026, parking operations at the facility transitioned to Calgary Parking, introducing time-limited free parking with paid rates applied after the free period to manage demand and improve turnover.
