= Tuscany station =

Light rail station in Calgary, Alberta, Canada

Tuscany
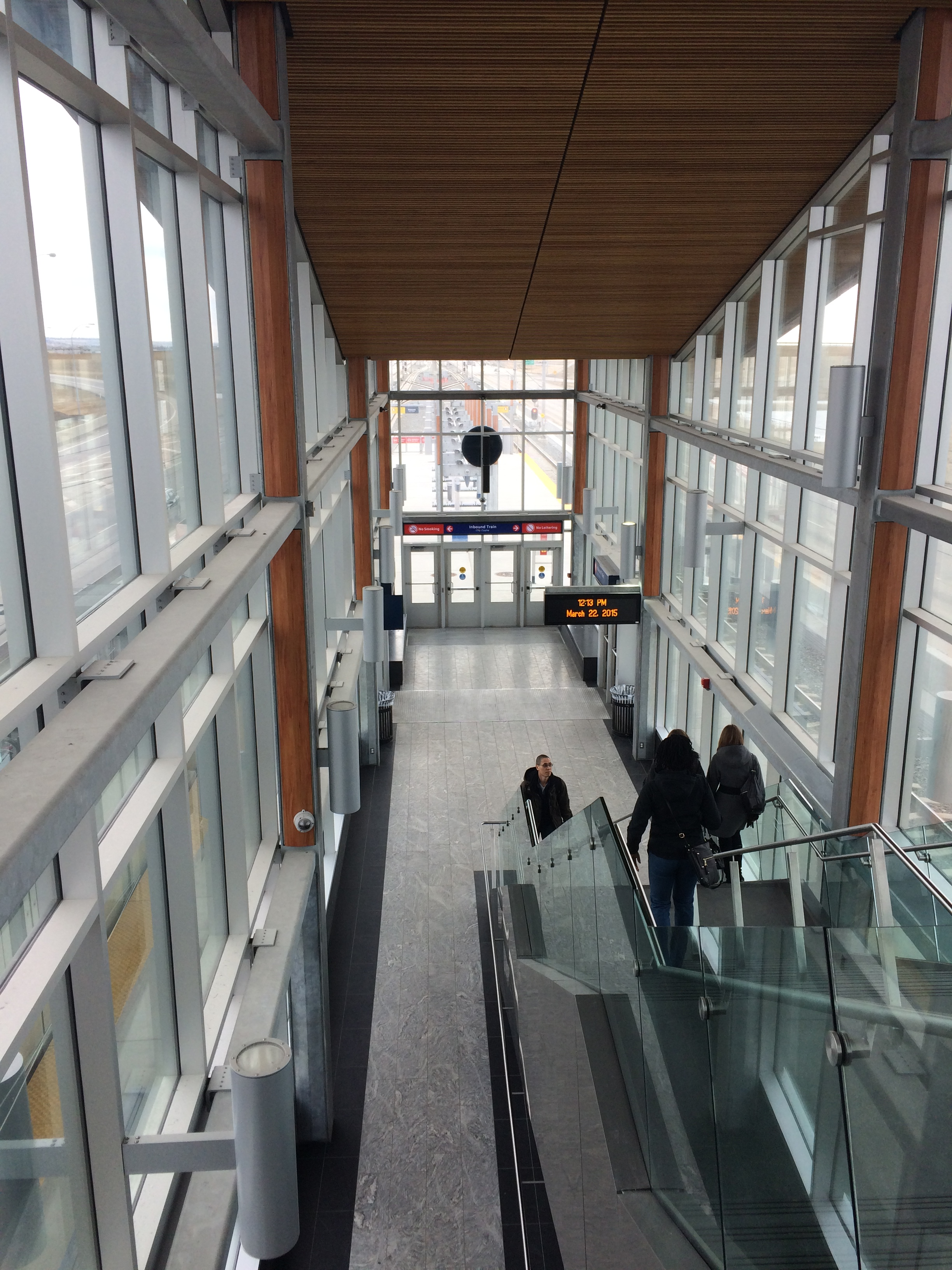

General information
- Coordinates: 51°08′07″N 114°14′15″W
- Owner: Calgary Transit
- Line: Red Line
- Platforms: Center-loading platform
- Tracks: 2
- Connections: 26 Sarcee Trail Crosstown; 74 Tuscany; 115 Symons Valley Parkway; 138 Citadel; 158 Royal Oak; 169 Rocky Ridge

Construction
- Structure type: At-grade
- Parking: 2 Park and Ride lots
- Cycle facilities: Yes
- Accessible: yes

History
- Opened: 2014; 12 years ago
- Former names: Tuscany-Rocky Ridge

Passengers
- 2,860,000 (2014)

Services
Preceding station	Calgary Transit	Following station
Terminus	Red Line	Crowfoot toward Somerset–Bridlewood
Location

Tuscany Station is a CTrain light rail station in Tuscany and Rocky Ridge, Calgary, Alberta, Canada. It is the northern terminus of the Northwest Line (Route 201), and opened as part of the route's the 2 km (1.24 miles) extension on August 23, 2014. Originally referred to in planning documents as Tuscany/Rocky Ridge station, Calgary Transit simplified the name on the recommendation of the Community Consultation Committee.

== History ==
The station, originally planned for completion after 2023, was approved and funded by Calgary City Council on November 7, 2007, for completion by 2011. The station had been included as part of Mayor Dave Bronconnier's re-election platform during the 2007 Municipal elections. Construction was to begin in the Spring of 2009 with completion in Fall 2011. However, budget issues as well as a delay with the Crowchild Trail/Stoney Trail Interchange delayed the start of construction three years to Spring 2012 with an opening date of August 23, 2014. It is currently the northwestern station/terminus on the CTrain system on the Red Line.

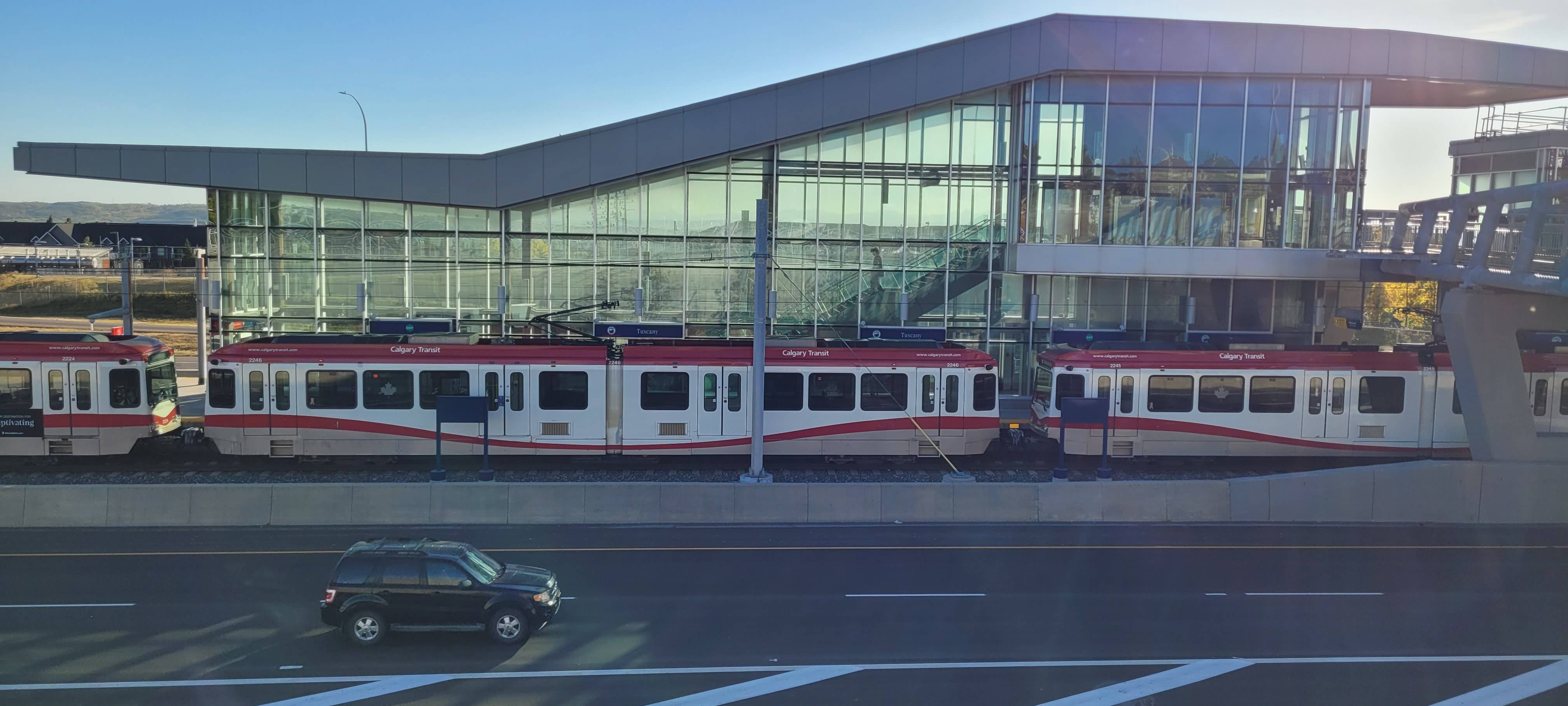
Tuscany Station as seen from the Rocky Ridge side, facing south. The westbound lanes of Crowchild Trail are visible on the bottom. Image taken on September 23, 2025.

== Location ==
The station is located in the median of Crowchild Trail, to the west of Rocky Ridge Road. The station is the final station currently planned for the Northwest leg of the CTrain, and is located approximately 2 kilometres (1.2 miles) northwest of the previous last CTrain station; Crowfoot. After only a few weeks of service the station exceeded the estimated usage of 9,000 weekday customers with 11,000 recorded weekday customers in mid-September 2014.

== Facilities ==
The station contains a set of stairs and two elevators. There are no escalators, which is notably different from various other stations on the same line. There are also public washrooms located by the Rocky Ridge terminal. Both bus terminals contain enclosed heated shelters, and places to chain up bikes.

=== Park and Ride ===
The station has two Park and Ride lots, one located on the north side in Rocky Ridge and the other on the south side in Tuscany. Plans are to incorporate into the development an Art Moderne heritage gas station building and sign from a former restaurant and motel, Eamon's Bungalow Camp, that once lay along the Old Banff Coach Road.

=== Pathways ===
The station's pedestrian bridges also form a part of the Rotary/Mattamy Greenway, a 145km series of pathways encircling the City of Calgary.

== Incidents and accidents ==
On September 20, 2016, the worst accident in CTrain history occurred in the tail-tracks north of the station. In the early morning, a three car Series 8 train, composed of units (listed from the north-facing direction) 2311, 2310 and 2329, stopped at the platform, and then accelerated into the tail-track. The accident resulted in three injuries stemming from the 60 km/h impact with an overhead wire pole at the end of the tracks. The driver suffered serious injuries, as the catenary counterweights went through the windshield. The accident resulted in car 2311 being retired.

== Buses ==
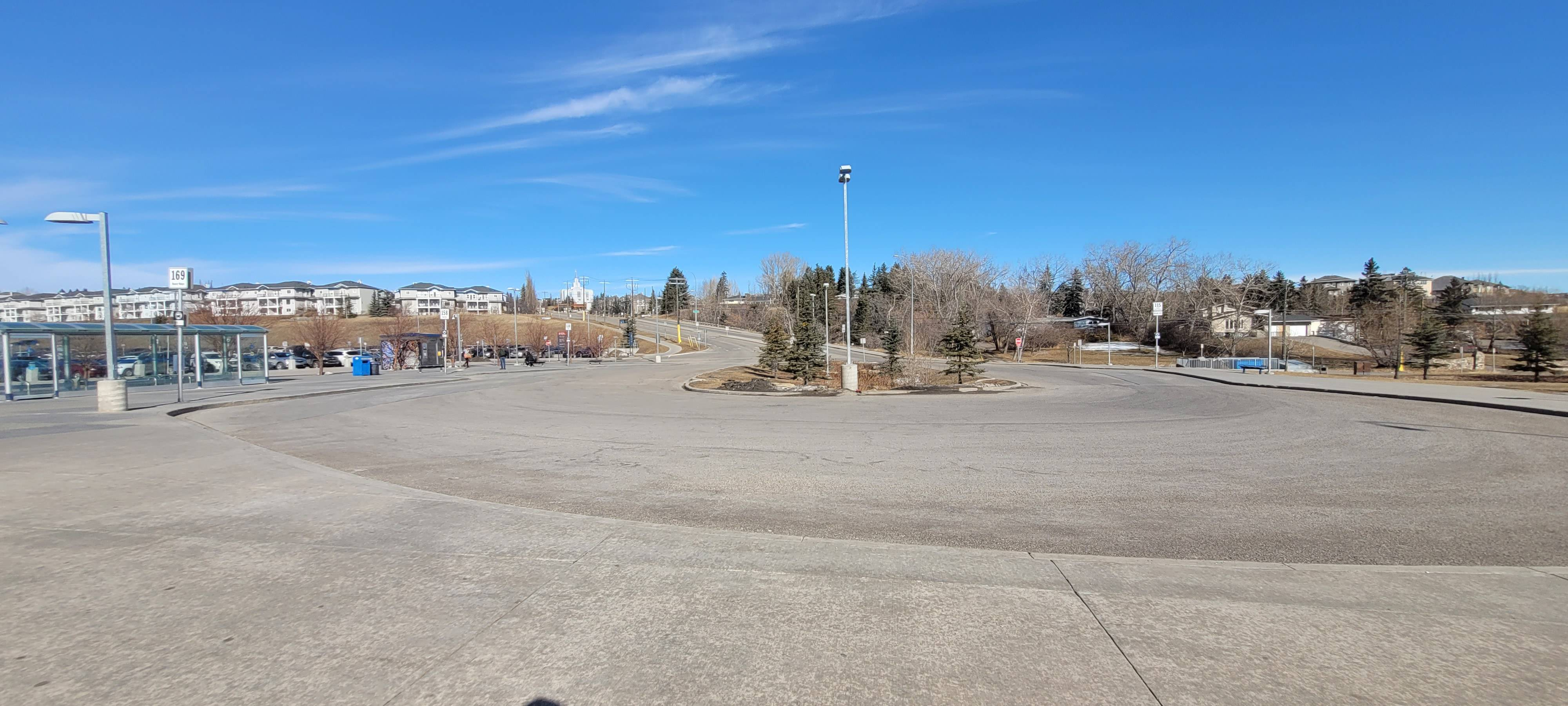
The Rocky Ridge bus terminal, facing north towards Rocky Ridge Road. All 4 bus stops are visible, the 138, 158 and 169 on the left side, and the 115 on the right. Image taken on February 26, 2025.

=== Rocky Ridge Terminal ===
The following bus routes originate from the Rocky Ridge terminal on the north side of the station:

- 115 - Symons Valley Parkway/North Pointe
- 138 - Citadel/Crowfoot
- 158 - Royal Oak
- 169 - Rocky Ridge

=== Tuscany Terminal ===
The following bus routes originate from the Tuscany terminal on the south side of the station:

- 26 - Sarcee Trail Crosstown/Westbrook
- 74 - Tuscany (Counterclockwise)
