= List of CTrain stations =

Calgary light rail system map

CTrain is a light rail system in Calgary, Alberta, Canada. It has been in operation since May 25, 1981. The system is operated by Calgary Transit, as part of the Calgary municipal government's transportation department. The CTrain system has two routes, with a combined route length of 59.9 kilometres (37.2 mi). The Red Line (also known as Route 201) is 35 kilometres (22 mi) long and serves the southern and northwestern areas of the city. The Blue Line (also known as Route 202) is 25.7 kilometres (16.0 mi) long, and serves the northeastern and western sections of the city.

Most CTrain track is at grade, within its own right-of-way. The downtown portion services both transit lines along the 7th Avenue South transit mall at street level, and is shared between the CTrain, Calgary Transit buses, and City of Calgary vehicles. This portion is a zero-fare zone and serves as a downtown people mover. The tracks split at the east and west ends of downtown into lines leading to the south, northeast, west and northwest residential neighbourhoods of Calgary. Six percent of the system is underground, and seven percent is grade-separated (elevated). Trains are powered by overhead electric wires, using pantographs to draw power.

== List of CTrain stations ==
Key

†	Terminus
*	7 Avenue Free Fare Zone
Red Line (Calgary)	Red Line
Blue Line (Calgary)	Blue Line

=== Active stations ===
Station	Route	Grade	Opened	Platform type	Parking spaces
Tuscany†	Red Line (Calgary)	Surface	2014	Centre	572
Crowfoot	Red Line (Calgary)	Surface	2009	Centre	1345
Dalhousie	Red Line (Calgary)	Surface	2003	Centre	740
Brentwood	Red Line (Calgary)	Surface	1990	Centre	980
University	Red Line (Calgary)	Surface	1987	Centre	None
Banff Trail	Red Line (Calgary)	Surface	1987	Side-loading	700 (at McMahon Stadium)
Lions Park	Red Line (Calgary)	Surface	1987	Side-loading	None
SAIT/AUArts/Jubilee	Red Line (Calgary)	Surface	1987	Centre	None
Sunnyside	Red Line (Calgary)	Surface	1987	Side-loading	None
8 Street SW*	Red Line (Calgary) Blue Line (Calgary)	Surface	1981	Side-loading (eastbound)	None
7 Street SW*	Red Line (Calgary) Blue Line (Calgary)	Surface	1981	Side-loading (westbound)	None
6 Street SW*	Red Line (Calgary) Blue Line (Calgary)	Surface	1981	Side-loading (eastbound)	None
4 Street SW*	Red Line (Calgary) Blue Line (Calgary)	Surface	1981	Side-loading (westbound)	None
3 Street SW*	Red Line (Calgary) Blue Line (Calgary)	Surface	1981	Side-loading (eastbound)	None
1 Street SW*	Red Line (Calgary) Blue Line (Calgary)	Surface	1981	Side-loading (westbound)	None
Centre St.*	Red Line (Calgary) Blue Line (Calgary)	Surface	1981	Side-loading (eastbound)	None
City Hall/Bow Valley College*	Red Line (Calgary) Blue Line (Calgary)	Surface	1981	Side-loading	None
Victoria Park/Stampede	Red Line (Calgary)	Surface	1981	Centre Side-loading (overflow)	None
Erlton/Stampede	Red Line (Calgary)	Surface	1981	Centre	None
39 Avenue	Red Line (Calgary)	Surface	1981	Side-loading	297
Chinook	Red Line (Calgary)	Surface	1981	Centre	320
Heritage	Red Line (Calgary)	Surface	1981	Centre	550
Southland	Red Line (Calgary)	Surface	1981	Centre	680
Anderson	Red Line (Calgary)	Surface	1981	Centre	1750
Canyon Meadows	Red Line (Calgary)	Surface	2001	Centre	260
Fish Creek–Lacombe	Red Line (Calgary)	Surface	2001	Centre	1130
Shawnessy	Red Line (Calgary)	Surface	2004	Staggered side-loading	200
Somerset–Bridlewood†	Red Line (Calgary)	Surface	2004	Centre	913
69 Street†	Blue Line (Calgary)	Trench	2012	Centre	827
Sirocco	Blue Line (Calgary)	Surface	2012	Side-loading	365
45 Street	Blue Line (Calgary)	Trench	2012	Side-loading	None
Westbrook	Blue Line (Calgary)	Underground	2012	Side-loading	None
Shaganappi Point	Blue Line (Calgary)	Surface	2012	Side-loading	None
Sunalta	Blue Line (Calgary)	Elevated	2012	Side-loading	None
Downtown West–Kerby*	Blue Line (Calgary)	Surface	2012	Side-loading	None
Bridgeland/Memorial	Blue Line (Calgary)	Surface	1985	Centre	None
Zoo	Blue Line (Calgary)	Surface	1985	Centre	500 (at Calgary Zoo)
Barlow/Max Bell	Blue Line (Calgary)	Surface	1985	Centre	50
Franklin	Blue Line (Calgary)	Surface	1985	Centre	578
Marlborough	Blue Line (Calgary)	Surface	1985	Centre	480
Rundle	Blue Line (Calgary)	Surface	1985	Centre	350
Whitehorn	Blue Line (Calgary)	Surface	1985	Centre	824
McKnight–Westwinds	Blue Line (Calgary)	Surface	2007	Centre	949
Martindale	Blue Line (Calgary)	Surface	2012	Staggered side-loading	None
Saddletowne†	Blue Line (Calgary)	Surface	2012	Centre	130

=== Former stations ===
Station	Route	Area	Open	Closed
3 Street SE	Blue Line (Calgary)	Downtown	1985	2010
Olympic Plaza	Red Line (Calgary) Blue Line (Calgary)	Downtown	1981	2011
10 Street SW	Blue Line (Calgary)	Downtown	1985	2012

=== Ghost station ===
Station	Area	Open	Location
Calgary Municipal Building	Downtown	Future	Planned subway line under 8th Ave

This underground station was built under the Municipal Building as part of a proposed future 8th Avenue subway. There is a short section of unused transit tunnel leading to it from the South leg that was blocked off after underground urban explorers started following it into the station.
