= Bow Trail =

Expressway in the southwest quadrant of Calgary, Alberta, Canada

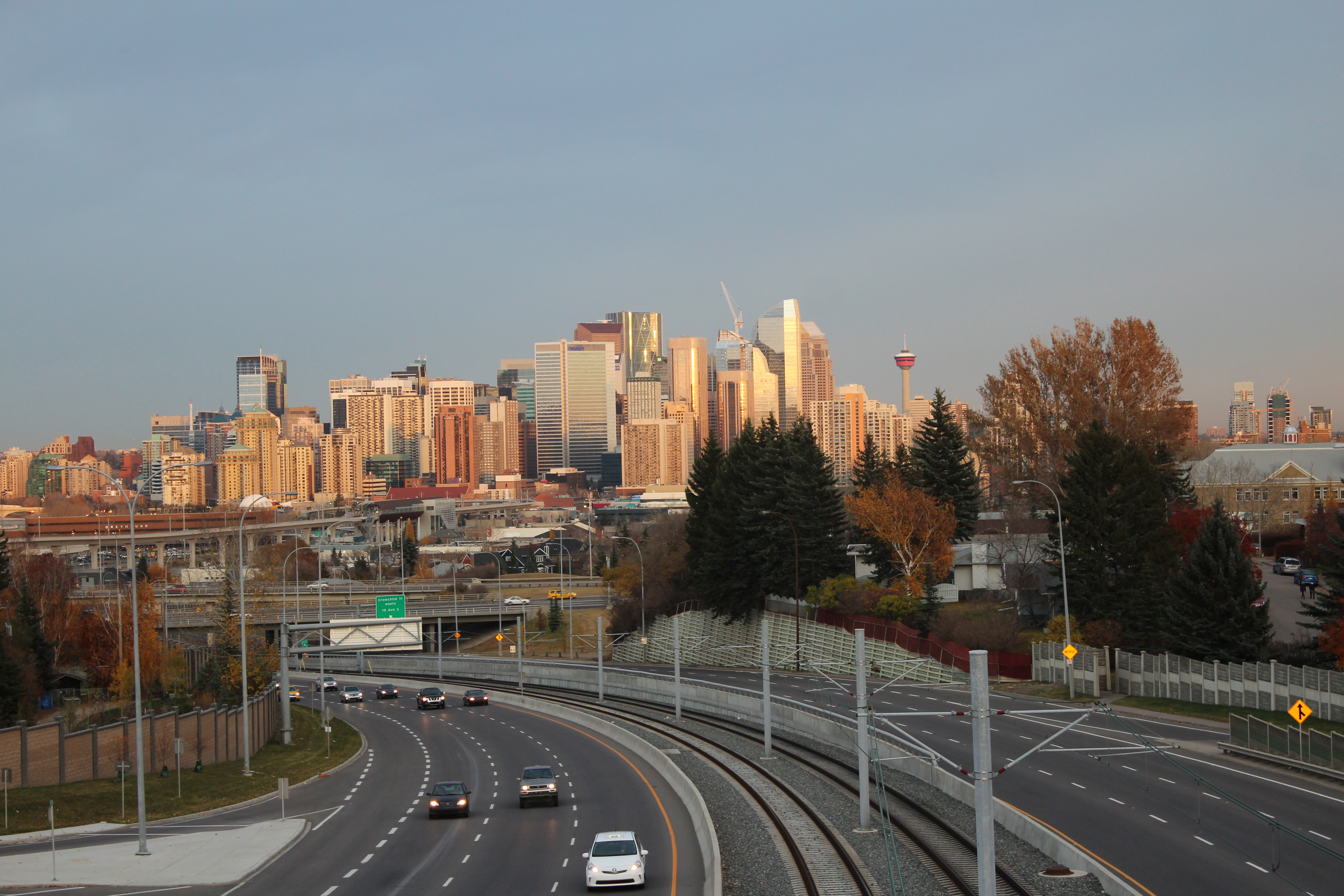
- Eastbound into Downtown Calgary
- Interactive map of Bow Trail
- Length: 9.3 km (5.8 mi)
- East end: 9 Avenue SW / 6 Avenue SW
- Major junctions: Crowchild Trail; Sarcee Trail
- West end: 101 Street SW

Bow Trail is an expressway in the southwest quadrant of Calgary, Alberta. It gets its name from the Bow River, which runs through the city north of the road itself. It runs from downtown Calgary, where the westbound traffic continues from 6 Avenue SW and eastbound traffic becomes 9 Avenue SW, past Stoney Trail to 101 Street SW at the city limits.

Bow Trail, along with 17 Avenue SW, are two major thoroughfares linking downtown Calgary to the west end of the city. In the late 1960s, there were plans to extend Bow Trail along a more northerly alignment (roughly at the present-day 3 Avenue S) before linking with Memorial Drive east of downtown. Fierce opposition to freeways running through downtown Calgary scuttled the plans, and the C-Train gained favour.

== History ==
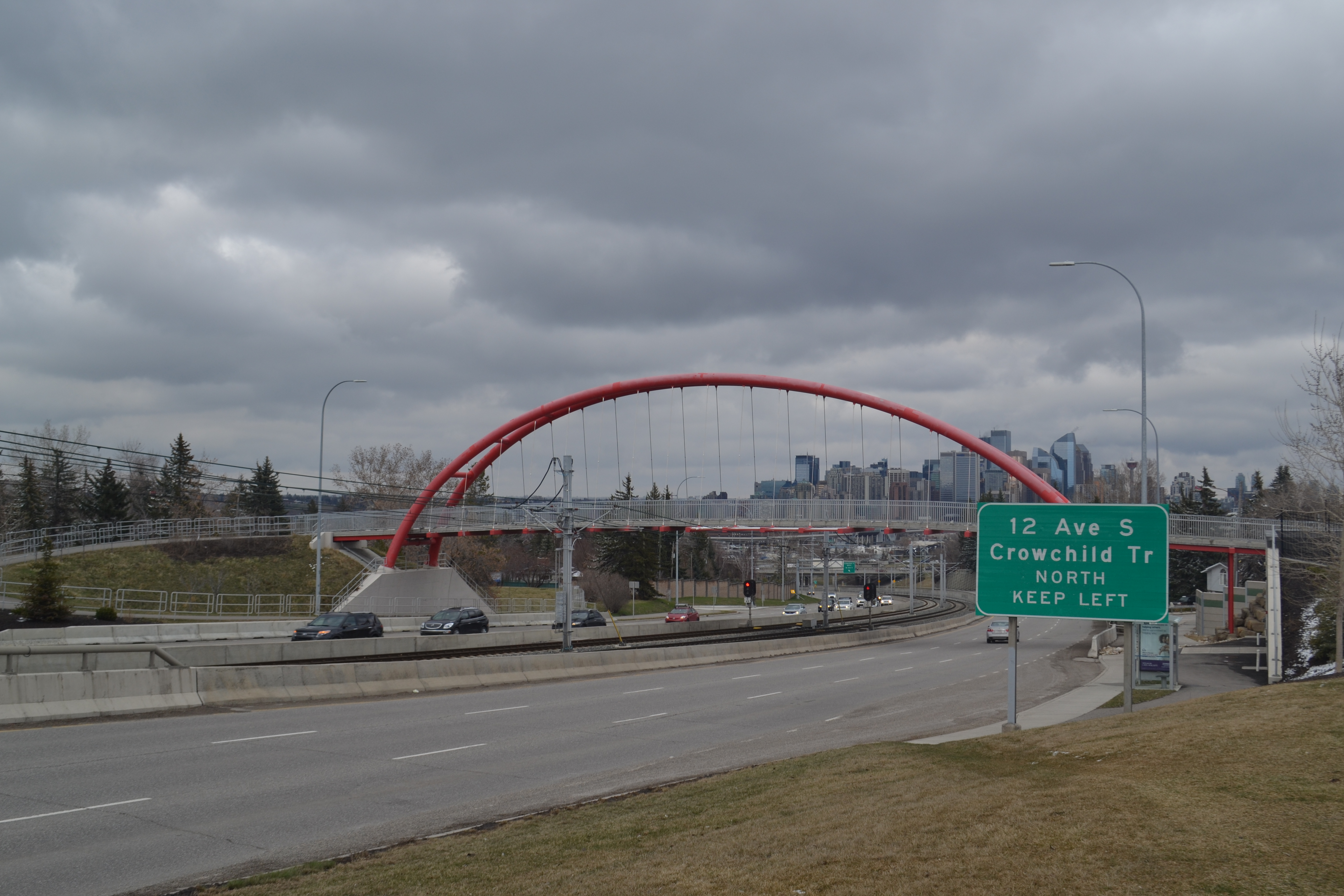
Bow Trail Pedestrian Bridge

Prior to it being named Bow Trail, the road west of 33 Street SW was known as Banff Coach Road. The road was rerouted with westbound expansion, with Bow Trail being rerouted on a more southerly route west of Sarcee Trail. The remainder of the road exists today, as Old Banff Coach Road. East of 33 Street SW and west of Crowchild Trail, Bow Trail conformed to Calgary's street numbering conventions, and was known as 12 Avenue SW.

In 2004, the city of Calgary conducted a traffic volume study along Bow Trail that found the four lane road inadequate. Consequently, an additional westbound lane was added between 33 Street and Sarcee Trail by 2006. The section between Sarcee Trail and Strathcona Boulevard was widened and landscaped by 2007, while the intersection with Sarcee Trail was improved. Although an interchange with Sarcee has been proposed for many years (with the abandoned "Go Plan" of the mid-1990s at one point proposing the interchange include a link to a southern extension of Shaganappi Trail), as of 2018 none is planned; the city built one further south at Sarcee and 17th Avenue S.W. in the late 2000s instead.

In 2010, construction of the west leg of the C-Train light rail transit system begun along the Bow Trail between Crowchild Trail and 33 Street West. This involved widening Bow Trail east of 33rd Street, and a slight realignment at 33rd and Bow to allow room for the tracks and a tunnel entrance. Construction was completed in December 2012.

Until 2023, Bow Trail ended at 85th Street, though the road at the time continued for a short way beyond as 12th Avenue S.W., an unpaved rural access road. In 2023, an interchange with the then-recent southwestern leg of the Stoney Trail ring road was added with Bow Trail officially ending at 101 Street SW at the city limits.

== Major intersections ==
From east to west. The entire route is in Calgary.

km	mi	Destinations	Notes
0.0	0.0	9 Avenue SW / 6 Avenue SW	One-way split; eastbound traffic continues as 9 Ave SW; westbound traffic continues from 6 Ave SW
0.0	0.0	11 Street SW	
0.5	0.31	14 Street SW	Interchange; no eastbound exit and westbound entrance
0.9	0.56	16 Street SW	Left-in/left-out; access to former Greyhound bus depot
0.9	0.56	Passes Sunalta CTrain station	
1.0	0.62	Pumphouse Avenue	Eastbound right-in/right-out; eastbound access to 5 Avenue SW from M-F, 6-9AM
1.0	0.62	4 Avenue SW	Westbound entrance only; closed M-F, 6-9AM
1.0	0.62	Pumphouse Road	Westbound right-in/right-out; no access M-F, 6-9AM
1.8	1.1	Crowchild Trail	Interchange; no westbound to southbound exit; no northbound to westbound entrance
1.8	1.1	12 Avenue SW	Via 10 Avenue SW; eastbound exit and westbound entrance
2.3	1.4	24 Street SW	Westbound right-in/right-out
2.7	1.7	26 Street SW	
2.7	1.7	Shaganappi Point CTrain station (located in median)	
3.5	2.2	33 Street SW, Spruce Drive	Access to Westbrook CTrain station and Westbrook Mall
4.1	2.5	37 Street SW	
5.3	3.3	45 Street SW	Access to Edworthy Park
5.9	3.7	Sarcee Trail	Partial cloverleaf interchange proposed.
7.2	4.5	Strathcona Boulevard, Old Banff Coach Road	Single-point urban interchange proposed.
9.3	5.8	85 Street SW	Single-point urban interchange proposed.
		Stoney Trail (Highway 201)	Partial cloverleaf Interchange
		101 Street SW	Western terminus
1.000 mi = 1.609 km; 1.000 km = 0.621 mi: Incomplete access

== See also ==
- Transportation in Calgary
