= 4 Street SW station =

Light rail station in Calgary, Alberta, Canada

4 Street SW
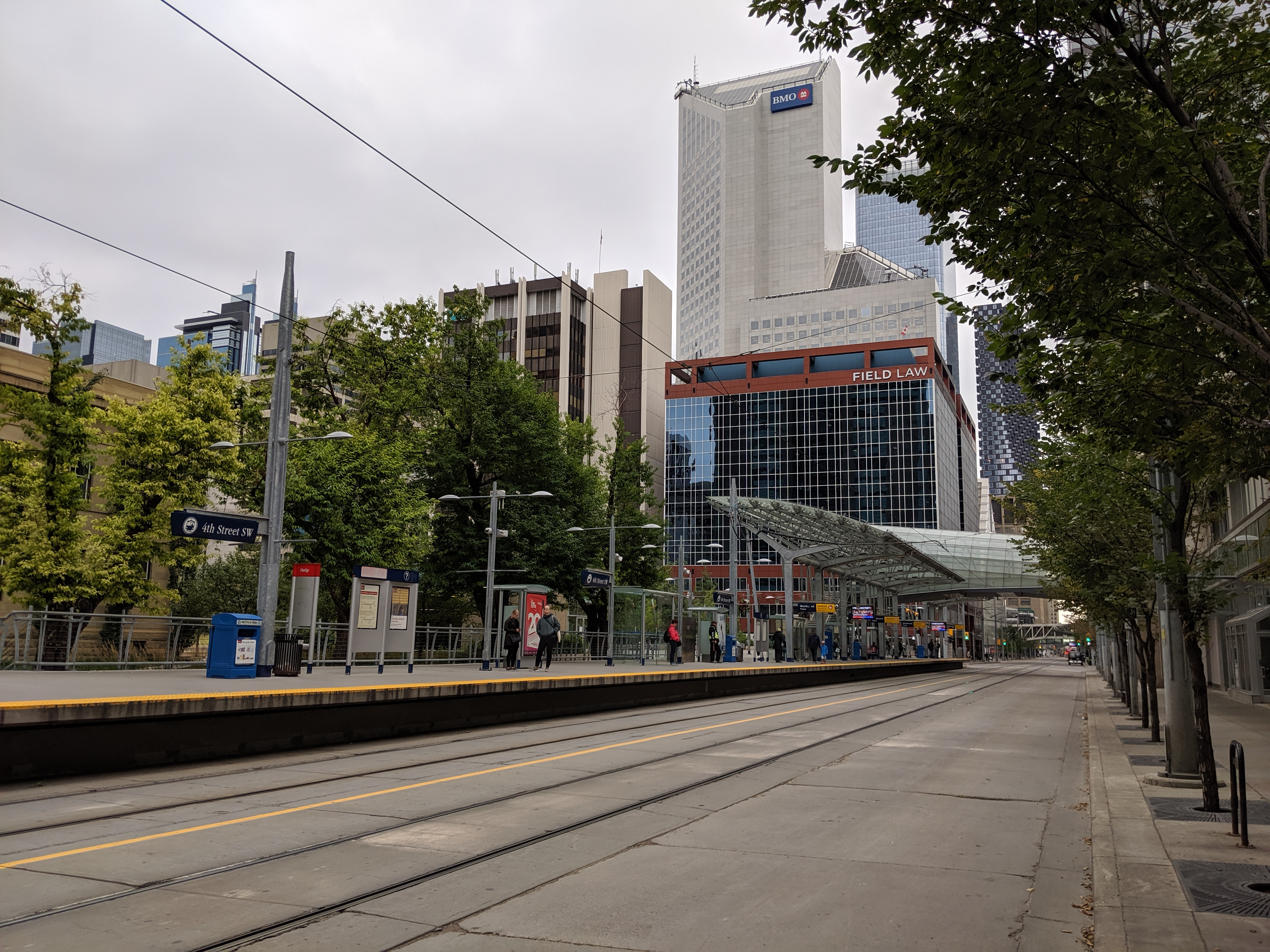
- 4 Street SW station

General information
- Location: 530C - 7 Avenue SW
- Coordinates: 51°02′48.5″N 114°04′20″W
- Owner: Calgary Transit
- Platforms: Single side-loading platform
- Connections: 1 Bowness/Forest Lawn; 2 Kilarney-17 Avenue; 3 Elbow Drive; 4 Huntington; 5 North Haven; 6 Killarney 26 Ave; 7 Marda Loop; 13 Altadore; 15 Deerfoot Meadows; 17 Renfrew; 101 Inglewood; 302 BRT Southeast; Max Yellow City Centre/Woodpark; 500 Airport Express

Construction
- Structure type: At-grade
- Accessible: yes

History
- Opened: 1981; 45 years ago
- Rebuilt: 2011; 15 years ago

Services
Preceding station	Calgary Transit	Following station
7 Street SW toward Tuscany	Red Line	1 Street SW One-way operation
7 Street SW toward 69 Street	Blue Line	1 Street SW One-way operation
Location

The 4 Street SW Station is a Calgary C-Train light rail station in located Downtown Calgary, Alberta, Canada. The 4 Street SW platform is served by westbound trains only, with the nearest eastbound platforms being the 3 Street SW station and the 6 Street SW station. The platform is located on the north side of 7 Avenue South, within the free-fare zone serving both Routes 201 and 202.

== History ==
The 4 Street W station is located between 4 Street & 5 Street SW. The station opened on May 25, 1981 as part of Calgary's original LRT line from 8 Street W to Anderson. The original station was closed on January 7, 2010, and demolished immediately with the new station constructed in its place. The new station opened on January 21, 2011.

On March 22, 2023, as part of an attempt to deal with crime along the C-Train system, 4th Street SW Station, along with every other station between City Hall and Downtown West-Kerby Stations would have the lighting and cameras upgraded.

== Crime ==
Random man attacked random strangers across Calgary’s Downtown Commercial District on the early Friday morning of October 15, 2021. Of the four victims of the machete attacks, the first attack happened at the 4th Street LRT Station at around 3:15 AM.

On December 21, 2021, across two different LRT stations in the downtown core, three stabbings took place. Of the three stabbings, two took place at the 4th Street LRT Station. In all three cases it was suspected that the motive was out of hate, as all three victims were homeless.

During the night hours of January 10th, 2022, a violent fight would take place between two men right outside of the 4th Street LRT Station. This violent fight would be recorded and would end up with one of the men in the fight getting stabbed.

On Wednesday March 15th, 2023 at roughly 6:20 AM, police were called to 4 Street SW Downtown LRT station. A man and a woman were rushed to hospital with stab wounds in non-life-threatening condition. The station was shut down at 7:26 am for further investigation and a man was taken into custody. This incident would get widely publicized, with people criticizing Calgary Transit and general concern being brought up due to a surplus in crime happening along the C-Train system.

== Ridership ==
According to data released by Calgary Transit, the 4 Street SW Station had an average weekday daily ridership of 11,100 in the year of 2007.

== Transit connections ==
Bus connections to the station as of 31 August, 2026:

- 1 - Bowness / 1 - Forest Lawn
- 2 - Killarney-17 Avenue / 2 - Mount Pleasant
- 3 - Centre St /3 - Elbow Drive
- 4 - Huntington
- 5 - North Haven
- 6 - Kilarney-17 Ave
- 7 - Marda Loop/City Centre
- 13 - City Centre / 13 - Westhills
- 15 - City Centre
- 17 - Renfrew
- 101 - City Centre
- 302 - BRT South Health Campus
- - Max Yellow (City Centre) / - Max Yellow (Woodpark)
- 500 - Airport Express
