= 7 Street SW station =

Light rail station in Calgary, Alberta, Canada

7 Street SW
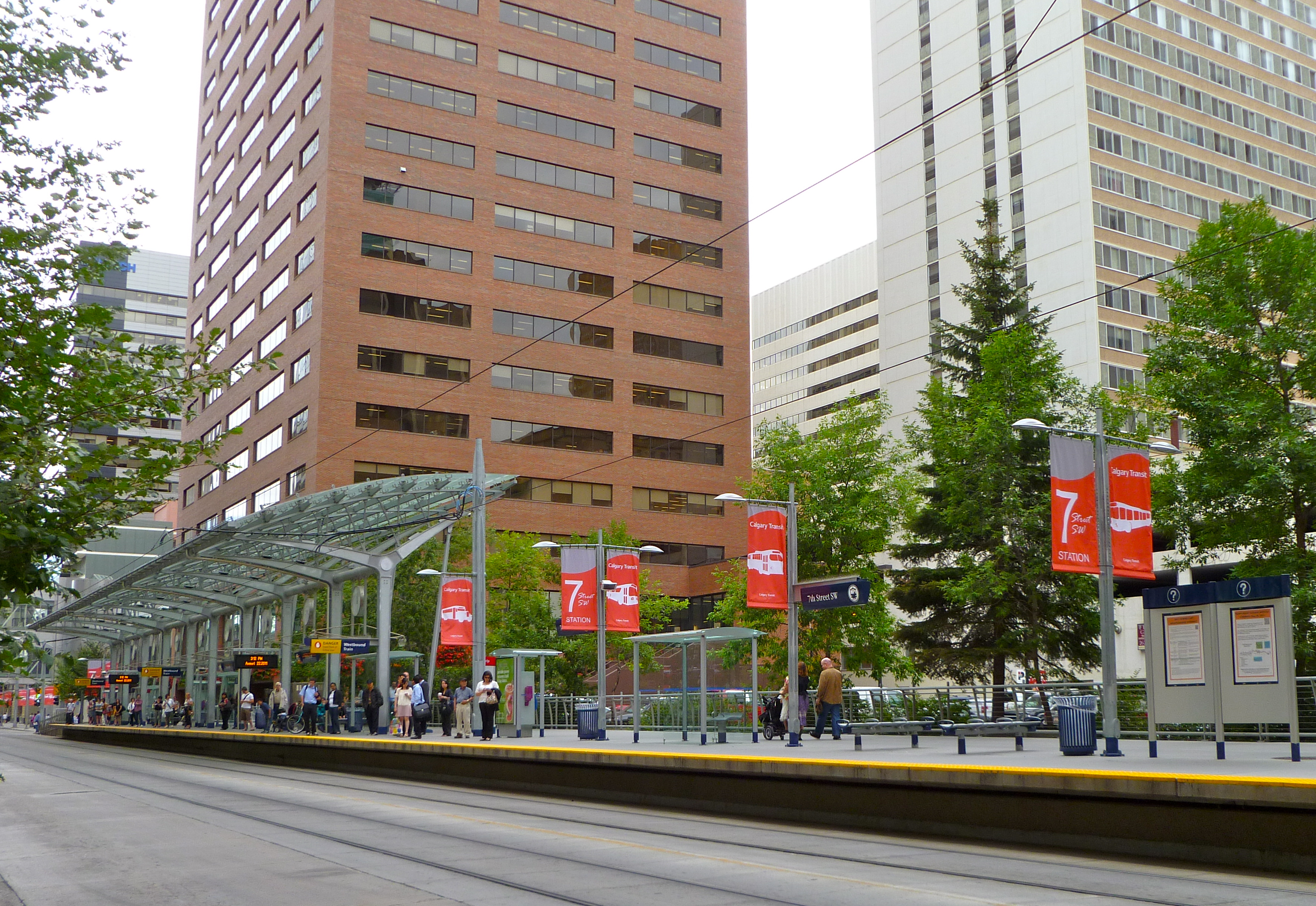

General information
- Location: 840C - 7 Avenue SW
- Coordinates: 51°02′49.2″N 114°04′48″W
- Owner: Calgary Transit
- Platforms: Single side-loading platform
- Connections: 1 Bowness/Forest Lawn; 4 Huntington; 5 North Haven; 6 Killarney 26 Ave; 7 Marda Loop; 13 Altadore; 22 Richmond Road; 66 Lakeview; Max Green North Pointe; Max Yellow Woodpark

Construction
- Structure type: At-grade
- Accessible: yes

History
- Opened: 1981; 45 years ago
- Rebuilt: 2009; 17 years ago

Services
Preceding station	Calgary Transit	Following station
Sunnyside toward Tuscany	Red Line	4 Street SW One-way operation
Downtown West–Kerby toward 69 Street	Blue Line	4 Street SW One-way operation

Former services
Preceding station	Calgary Transit	Following station
10 Street SW Terminus	Blue Line	4 Street SW One-way operation
Location

7 Street SW station is a CTrain light rail station in downtown Calgary, Alberta, Canada. It is used only by westbound trains, with the nearest stations serving east bound trains being 6 Street SW station and 8 Street SW station, both of which only serve eastbound trains. The station platform is located on the north side of 7 Avenue South, within the free fare zone of the CTrain and serves both routes 201 and 202.

The original 7 Street W station was located between 7 Street & 8 Street SW (adjacent to the Sandman Hotel) and opened on May 25, 1981, as part of Calgary's original LRT line from 8 Street W to Anderson. On February 27, 2009, the new 7 Street W station opened one block East (between 6 Street & 7 Street SW) and the old platform was immediately closed and demolished shortly afterwards.

Like all refurbished 7 Avenue platforms, the entire sidewalk slopes up to the station at both ends and the platform can handle 4-car trains.

The station registered an average of 12,400 weekday boardings in 2005.

In 2008, according to the Calgary Transit Website, the daily weekday ridership remains at an unchanged rate of 12,400 boardings.

== Transit connections ==
Bus connections to the station as of 31 August, 2026:

- 1 - Bowness/Forest Lawn
- 4 - Huntington
- 5 - North Haven
- 13 - City Centre
- 22 - Richmond Road
- 66 - Lakeview
- - Max Green (North Pointe)
- - Max Yellow (Woodpark)
