= Killarney, Calgary =

Killarney/Glengarry Killarney
- Neighbourhood
- Location of Killarney/Glengarry in Calgary
- Coordinates: 51°01′54″N 114°07′36″W
- Country: Canada
- Province: Alberta
- City: Calgary
- Quadrant: SW
- Ward: 8
- Established: 1906
- Annexed: 1910

Government
  - Mayor: Jeromy Farkas
  - Administrative body: Calgary City Council
  - Councillor: Nathaniel Schmidt (Independent)
- Elevation: 1,120 m (3,670 ft)

Population (2011)
  - Total: 6,543
  - Median household income: $53,799
- Website: Killarney Community Association

Killarney/Glengarry, also known as Killarney, is a residential neighbourhood in the city of Calgary, Alberta, Canada. It is bounded by 17th Avenue S.W. on the north, 37th Street S.W. on the west, Richmond Road S.W. on the south, and 25A Street S.W. on the east. It was named after Glengarry County, Ontario, as the place the first settlers originated from.

== History ==
The first subdivision plan for the community of Killarney was registered with the Alberta Land Titles Office in 1906, and the lands were formally annexed by the City in 1910. Development before the Second World War was slow; most houses built at the time were one-storey clapboard structures. The community was filled out in the post-war era, when developers erected hundreds of small stucco and clapboard bungalows on the 25- and 50-foot (15 m) wide lots. Since approximately 2002, developers have been replacing the older structures with low- and medium-density infill housing on a piecemeal basis.

Westbrook Mall, a small regional shopping centre featuring Walmart and Canada Safeway, is located directly north of the community. There are also numerous shops along 17th Avenue, 26th Avenue and 37th Street S.W.

The community has an area redevelopment plan in place.

== Demographics ==
In the City of Calgary's 2012 municipal census, Killarney/Glengarry had a population of 6,816 living in 3,679 dwellings, a 4.2% increase from its 2011 population of 6,543. With a land area of 1.8 km^{2} (0.69 sq mi), it had a population density of 3,790/km^{2} (9,810/sq mi) in 2012.

Residents in this community had a median household income of $53,799 in 2005, and there were 19.5% low income residents living in the neighbourhood. As of 2006, 19.1% of the residents were immigrants. A proportion of 41.4% of the buildings were condominiums or apartments, and 46.0% of the housing was used for renting.

The Killarney community is a part of the Calgary Centre federal electoral district, the Calgary Currie provincial constituency. It is represented in the Calgary City Council by the Ward 8 councillor.

== Crime ==
Crime Data
Year	Crime Rate (/100 pop.)
2018	3.1
2019	3.6
2020	3.2
2021	3.3
2022	3.1
2023	2.1

== Schools ==
Killarney is home to the following schools:

- Holy Name Elementary School (Bilingual) (separate school board)
- Killarney Elementary School (public school board - Montessori programming)

Killarney is also served by the following schools in adjoining neighbourhoods:

- A.E. Cross Junior High School (public)
- Vincent Massey Junior High School (public)
- Ernest Manning High School (public)
- Salvation Army Children's Village School (run in partnership between the public school board and the Salvation Army)

== Public transit ==
Killarney is serviced by the following Calgary Transit routes (as of December 10, 2012):

- Route 2, Killarney/17 Avenue/Mt.Pleasant
- Route 6, Killarney 26th Avenue
- Route 94, Strathcona/Westbrook
- Route 306 BRT (Bus Rapid Transit), Westbrook/Heritage

The West LRT C-Train began operation on December 10, 2012 and includes a stop near Westbrook Mall just north of 17th Ave SW.

== See also ==
- List of neighbourhoods in Calgary
