= 3 Street SW station =

Light rail station in Calgary, Alberta, Canada

3 Street SW
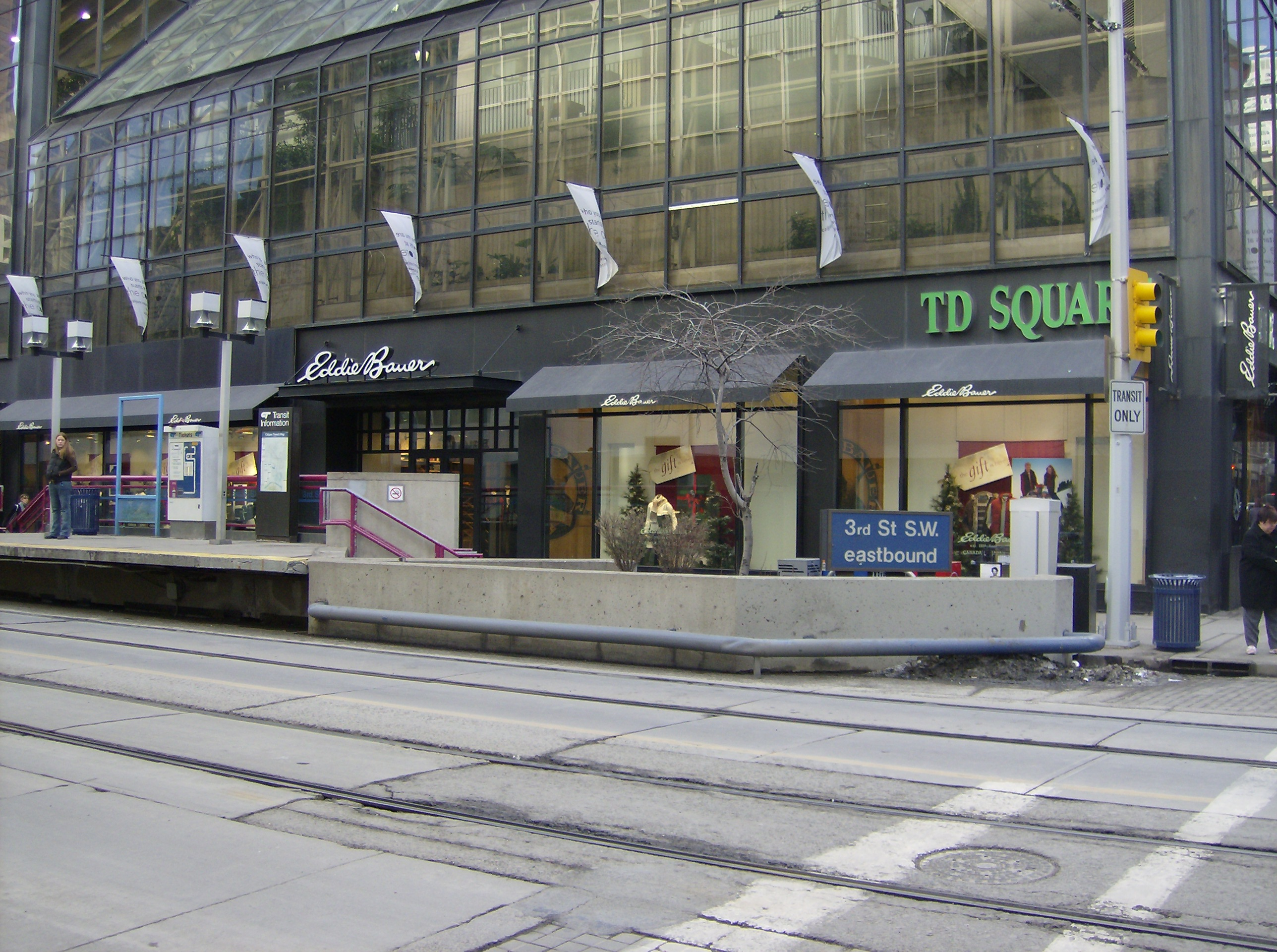
- 3rd St SW (eastbound)

General information
- Location: 333C - 7 Avenue SW
- Coordinates: 51°02′47.8″N 114°04′09″W
- Owner: Calgary Transit
- Platforms: Single side-loading platform
- Connections: 1 Bowness/Forest Lawn; 2 Kilarney-17 Avenue; 3 Elbow Drive; 4 Huntington; 5 North Haven; 6 Killarney 26 Ave; 13 Altadore; 17 Renfrew; 22 Richmond Road; 66 Lakeview; 101 Inglewood; Max Green City Centre; Max Yellow City Woodpark

Construction
- Structure type: At-grade
- Accessible: yes

History
- Opened: 1981
- Rebuilt: 2010

Services
Preceding station	Calgary Transit	Following station
6 Street SW One-way operation	Red Line	Centre Street toward Somerset–Bridlewood
6 Street SW One-way operation	Blue Line	Centre Street toward Saddletowne

Future services (at 7 Avenue SW)
Preceding station	Calgary Transit	Following station
Terminus	Green Line	Beltline toward Shepard
Location

3 Street SW station is a Calgary C-Train light rail station in Downtown Calgary, Alberta, Canada. The 3 Street SW platform is used by eastbound trains, with the nearest stations serving westbound trains being and the 4 Street SW station and the 1 Street SW station. The platforms is located on the south side of 7 Avenue S and is located within the free-fare zone serving both Routes 201 and 202.

== History ==
The 3 Street W station, located between 3 Street and 2 Street SW and adjacent to The CORE/TD Square shopping centre that opened on May 25, 1981, as part of Calgary's original LRT line from 8 Street W to Anderson. The original station was closed on April 20, 2009, and demolished immediately with the new station constructed in its place. The new station opened on March 12, 2010.

On March 22, 2023, as part of an attempt to deal with crime along the C-Train system, 3rd Street SW Station, along with every other station between City Hall and Downtown West-Kerby Stations would have the lighting and cameras upgraded.

== Ridership ==
According to data released by Calgary Transit, the 3 Street SW Station had an average weekday daily ridership of 16,300 in the year of 2007.

== Transit connections ==
Bus connections to the station as of 31 August, 2026:

- 1 - Bowness/Forest Lawn
- 2 - Killarney-17 Avenue/Mount Pleasant
- 3 - Centre St/Elbow Drive
- 4 - Huntington
- 5 - North Haven
- 6 - City Centre/Westhills
- 13 - City Centre/Westhills
- 17 - Ramsay
- 22 - Richmond Road/City Centre
- 66 - City Centre/Lakeview
- 101 - City Centre
- - Max Green (City Centre)
- - Max Yellow (Woodpark)
