= Sunalta station =

CTrain light rail in Calgary, Alberta, Canada

Sunalta
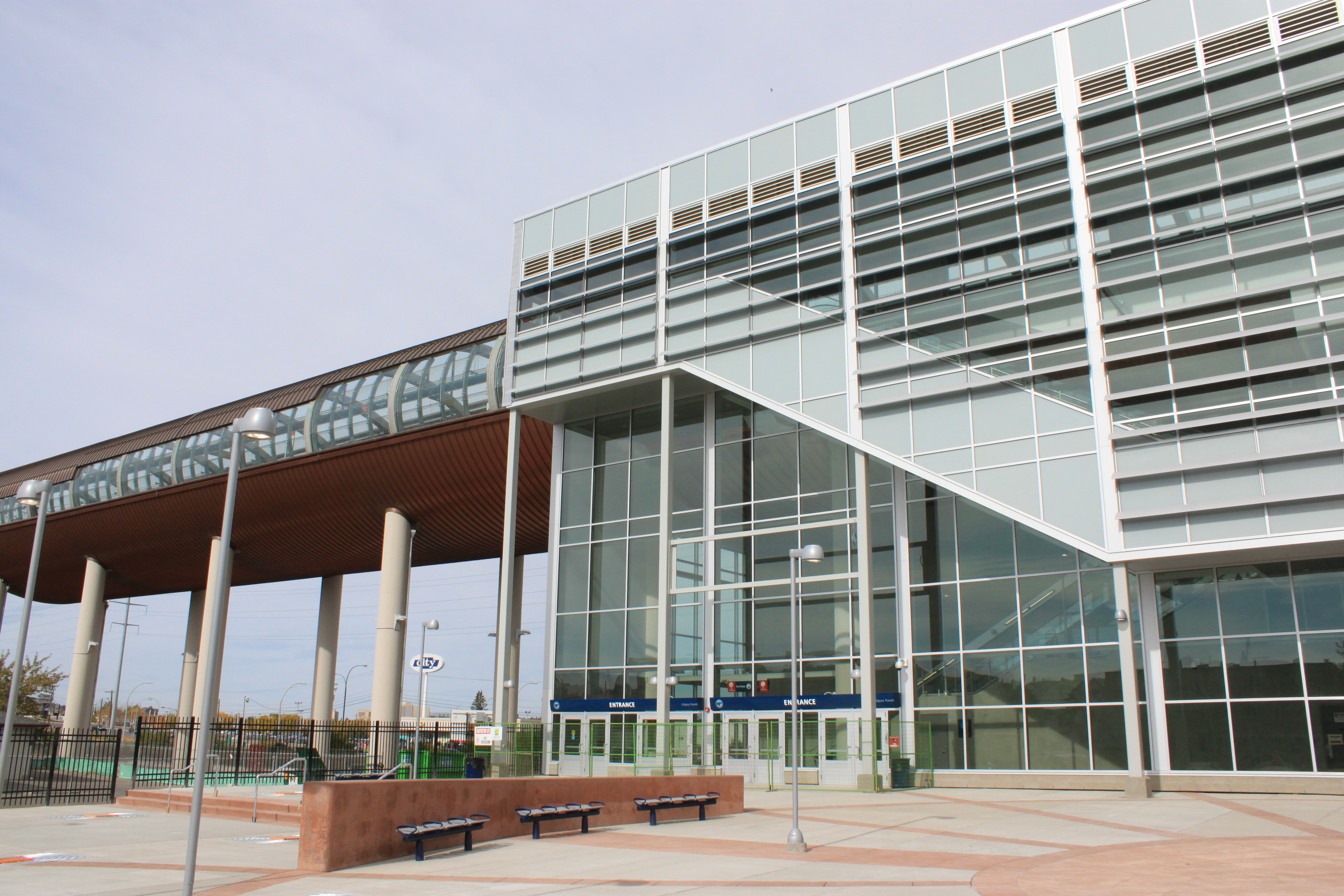

General information
- Location: 10 Ave. SW, Calgary, AB; Canada
- Coordinates: 51°02′41″N 114°05′58″W
- Owner: Calgary Transit
- Platforms: Side-loading platforms
- Connections: 66 Lakeview/City Centre; 90 Bridgeland/University of Calgary

Construction
- Structure type: Elevated
- Parking: None
- Accessible: yes

History
- Opened: 2012; 14 years ago

Services
Preceding station	Calgary Transit	Following station
Shaganappi Point toward 69 Street	Blue Line	Downtown West–Kerby toward Saddletowne

Former services
Preceding station	Calgary Transit	Following station
Shaganappi Point toward 69 Street	Blue Line	10 Street SW toward Saddletowne
Location

Sunalta Station is a CTrain light rail station in Calgary, Alberta, Canada. It serves the West segment of the Blue Line.

The station is located on an elevated guideway, constructed on the south side of the CPR mainline. It is located inside the community of Sunalta adjacent to 10 Avenue SW and Bow Trail, 1.1 km west of the 7 Avenue & 9 Street SW Interlocking.

Inside the station building, escalators, stairs and an elevator provide access to the mezzanine level where the pedestrian overpass connects the station to Bow Trail and the now-closed Greyhound Bus Depot. From the mezzanine level, a further two sets of escalators, stairs, and elevators provide access up to the side-loading platform. Sunalta is the first elevated station in the CTrain system. An Area Redevelopment Plan for the station's surroundings was approved by City Council in March 2010.

In its first year of service, Sunalta served an average of 5,640 boardings per day.

== History ==
Construction on Sunalta station began on July 14, 2010. The ceremonial opening was held on December 9, 2012, and on December 10, the station, and the West LRT project as a whole, opened for revenue.

== Transit connections ==
Bus connections to the station as of 22 December, 2025:

- 66 - Lakeview
- 90 - Bridgeland / 90 - University of Calgary

== Around the station ==
=== Major destinations ===
- Shaw Millennium Park
- Sunalta Station Place

=== Communities ===
Residential

- Beltline
  - West Connaught (sub-community of the Beltline)
- Downtown West End
- Scarboro
- Scarboro West/Sunalta West
- Sunalta

=== Education facilities ===
Primary schools

- Connaught Elementary
- Sunalta Elementary

=== Major streets ===
- 10 Avenue SW
- 14 Street SW
- 17 Avenue SW
- Bow Trail
- Crowchild Trail

== Crime ==
Sunalta Station has been criticized for being a crime hotspot in the Calgary C-Train System. On a CityNews interview in January 2022 with Calgary Transit Lead Staff 'Stephen Tauro', it was listed as one of the 5 stations with an unusually high crime rate. The others being: Marlborough, Rundle, Southland and Heritage Stations.

During the month of March 2023, an underground drug operation along the Calgary C-Train system would get disrupted. Officers seized the substances of fentanyl, methamphetamine, cocaine, morphine and xanax. Multiple weapons such as 21 knives, two machetes, two hatchets, a handgun, and a can of bear spray were also seized by police. 40 people would get arrested between multiple stations, Sunalta Station along with Franklin, Southland, Marlborough, Heritage, Rundle, Whitehorn, Brentwood, Chinook, Crowfoot, 8th Street SW, Anderson, Dalhousie, Westbrook Stations would have arrests relating to the aforementioned drug trade.

Emergency crews were called to Sunalta LRT Station at around 11:30 PM on the Friday night of April 28, 2017, after reports of a physical altercation between two men came in. When arrived, one of the men had suffered from serious stabbing-related injuries, and would be pronounced dead on the scene.

Transit peace officers were called to Sunalta LRT Station at approximately 11:40 PM on Wednesday November 30, 2022 after they were notified about a group of people loitering and causing disturbances at the station. The officers spoke with the individuals; during the interaction, one individual became argumentative with the officers and refused to leave. The man was determined to already have outstanding warrants and would be taken into custody after the altercation, where quantities of heroin, methamphetamine and fentanyl were seized.

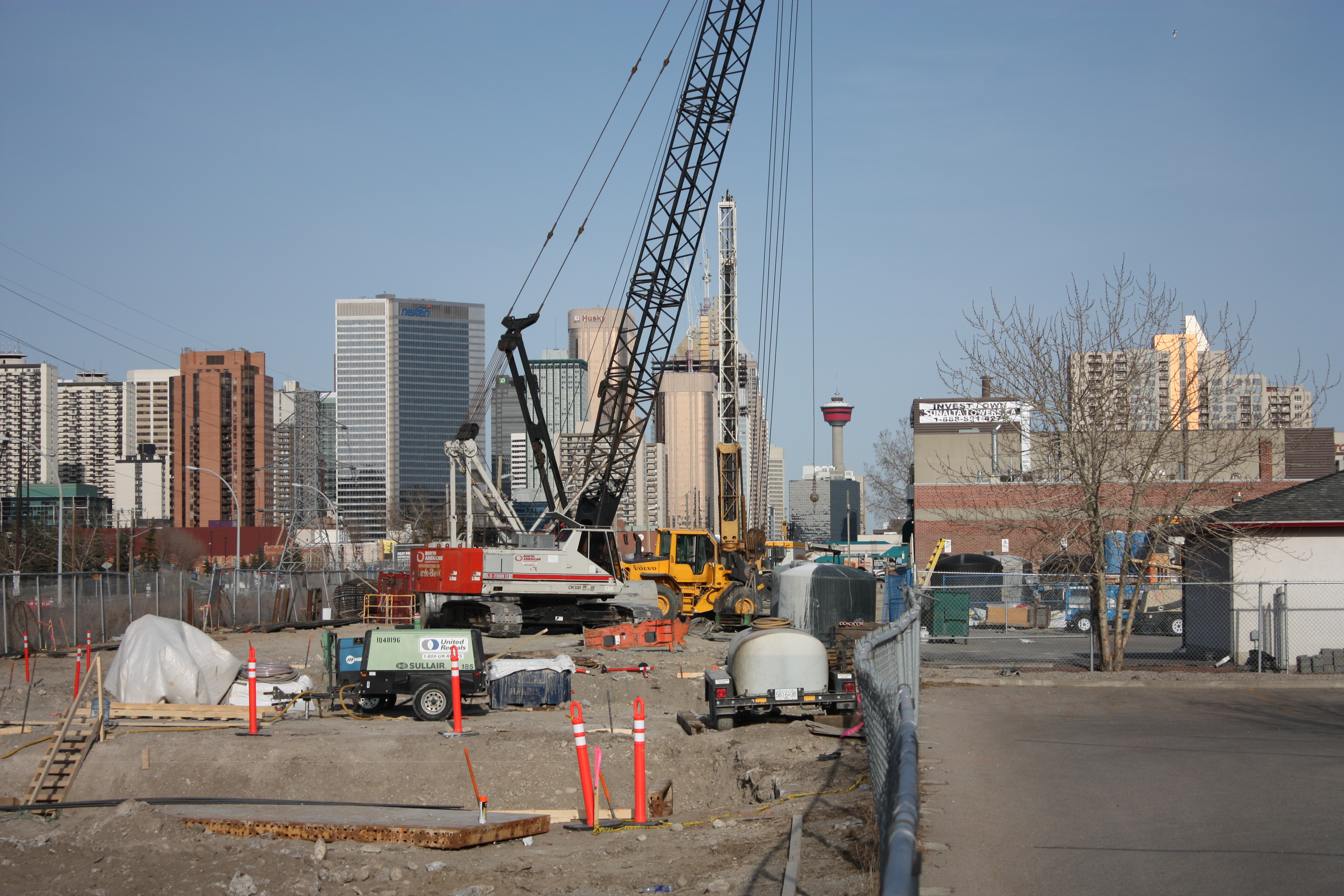
Construction of Sunalta Station in April 2010

== See also ==
- CTrain
- Blue Line (Calgary)
- Elevated railway
- Westbrook station (Calgary)
- Sunalta, Calgary
- Davies station (Edmonton)
