= Masabi (company) =

British technology company

Masabi Ltd.
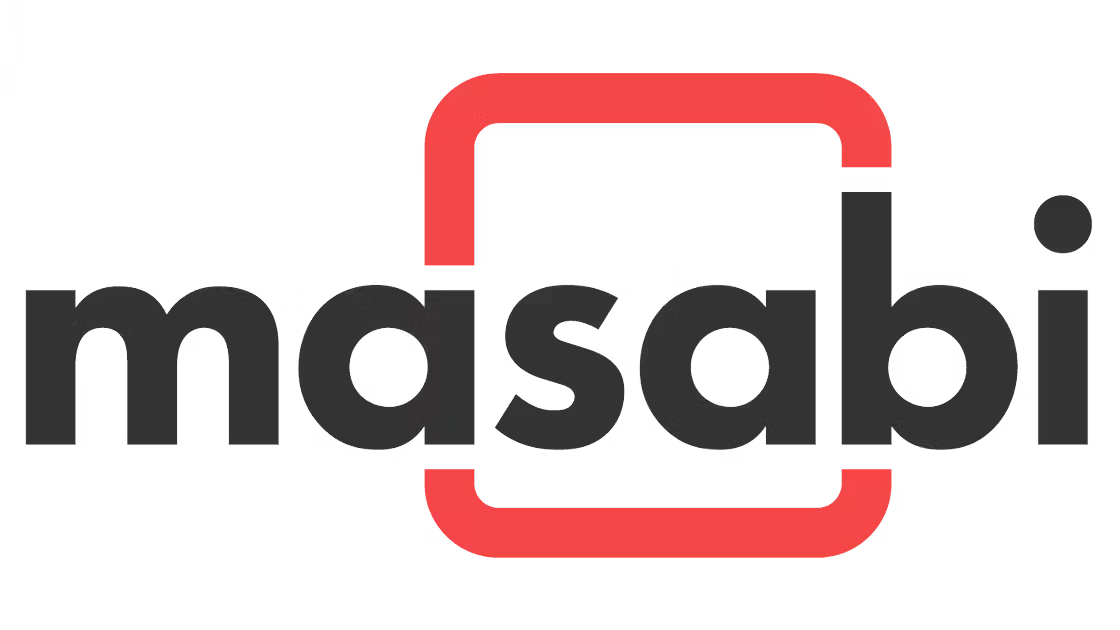
- Type: Private
- Industry: Technology
- Founded: 2001; 25 years ago
- Headquarters: London, UK
- Products: fare collection services for public transport companies
- Website: masabi.com

Masabi Ltd. is a British technology company that develops and markets fare collection services for public transport systems. The company offers mobile ticketing apps, smart cards, and other fare media for electronic fare collection, allowing users to buy tickets by app, on the web, at kiosks, and retail locations, and allowing tickets to be read by an electronic reader or scanned by a rail conductor by mobile phone.

== Services ==
The company's customers include public transit authorities in Calgary, Boston, London, Athens, Rome, Madrid, Adelaide, New York, Las Vegas, Los Angeles, Denver, Ohio and Japan.

In 2012, the company launched the first ticketless rail system in the United States, for the Massachusetts Bay Transportation Authority. In January 2019 Uber announced that its "transit offering" had gone live in Denver with RTD, with in-app ticketing provided by Masabi using its Justride SDK.

In April 2019, the company reported that it was on track to exceed US$1 billion in annual ticketing sales in the next year. It is currently located in offices in Tech City, London and in New York and Boston in the USA.

In 2020, Masabi's Justride SDK was recognized as Ticketing Technology of the Year at the Transport Ticketing Global Awards 2020.

== Funding ==
The company was founded in 2001 and raised seed funding of $2.8 million in 2013. In December 2015, the company raised $12 million in venture capital from an investor group including the public transport operator Keolis, MasterCard, Lepe Partners and existing investor MMC Ventures. A further $20 million was raised in April 2019, led by Smedvig Capital, with participation from MMC Ventures and other investors.
