= 8 Street SW station =

Light rail station in Calgary, Alberta, Canada

8 Street SW
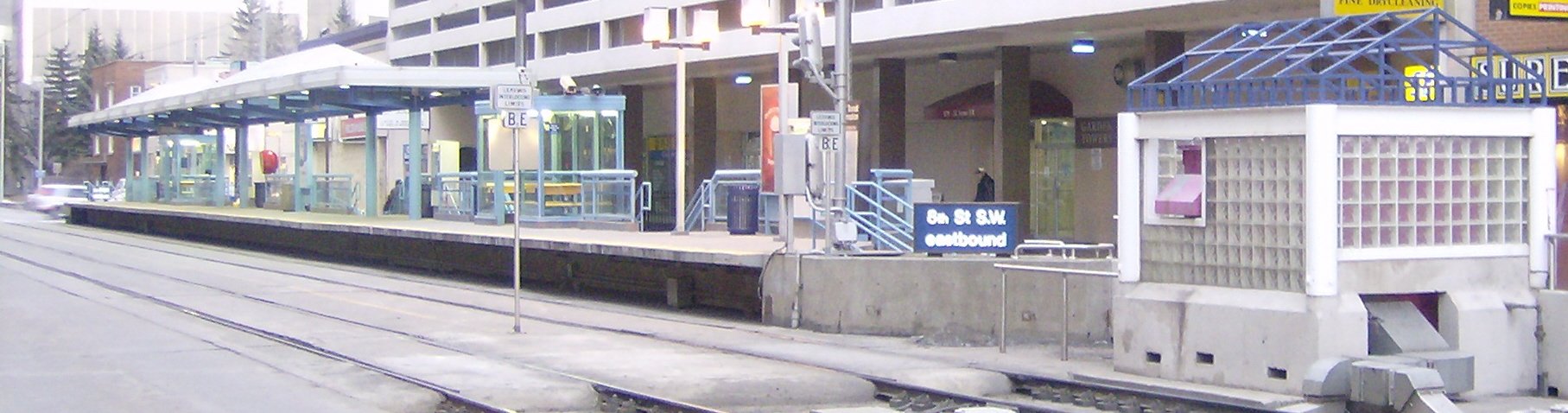

General information
- Location: 901C - 7 Avenue SW
- Coordinates: 51°02′49″N 114°04′52″W
- Owner: Calgary Transit
- Platforms: Single side-loading platform
- Tracks: 1
- Connections: 2 Killarney-17 Ave; 6 Killarney-26 Ave; 7 Marda Loop; 13 Altadore

Construction
- Structure type: At-grade
- Parking: None
- Accessible: Yes

Other information
- Fare zone: Fare free

History
- Opened: 1981
- Rebuilt: 2009
- Electrified: Overhead catenary

Services
Preceding station	Calgary Transit	Following station
Sunnyside One-way operation	Red Line	6 Street SW toward Somerset–Bridlewood
Downtown West–Kerby One-way operation	Blue Line	6 Street SW toward Saddletowne

Former services
Preceding station	Calgary Transit	Following station
Sunnyside One-way operation	Red Line	6 Street SW toward Somerset–Bridlewood
10 Street SW One-way operation	Blue Line	6 Street SW toward Saddletowne
Location

8 Street SW station is a CTrain light rail station in Downtown Calgary, Alberta, Canada. The station is used only by eastbound trains. The platform for the station is located on the south side of 7 Avenue SW.

For Route 201 Southbound, it is the first station in Downtown Calgary, and within the Downtown free fare zone. The station is used by trains serving both Routes 201 and 202.

The original platform was located between 9th and 8th streets SW adjacent to the Circle K. It opened on May 25, 1981, as part of Calgary's original LRT line from 8 Street W to Anderson. As part of the 7 Avenue Refurbishment Project, a new station was constructed one block east (between 8 Street & 7 Street SW and adjacent to Century Park) of its previous location and was opened on December 18, 2009. The original platform was immediately closed following the opening of the new platform and was demolished shortly afterwards.

Like all refurbished seven Avenue stations, the entire sidewalk slopes up to the platform level and the platform can accommodate four-car trains.

The station registered an average of 12,600 daily boardings in 2005.

According to the Calgary Transit website, in 2008, the ridership of the station of daily weekday boardings remained at an unchanged rate of 12,600 boardings.

== Crime ==
During the month of March 2023, an underground drug operation along the Calgary C-Train system would get disrupted. Officers seized the substances of fentanyl, methamphetamine, cocaine, morphine, and Xanax. Multiple weapons such as 21 knives, two machetes, two hatchets, a handgun, and a can of bear spray were also seized by police. 40 people would get arrested between multiple stations, 8th Street SW along with Franklin, Southland, Marlborough, Heritage, Sunalta, Rundle, Whitehorn, Brentwood, Chinook, Crowfoot, Anderson, Dalhousie, Westbrook Stations would have arrests relating to the aforementioned drug trade.

== Transit connections ==
Bus connections to the station as of 31 August, 2026:

- 2 - Killarney-17 Ave/Mount Pleasant
- 6 - City Centre/Westhills
- 7 - City Centre
- 13 - City Centre
