= Sunalta Station Place =

Three-story building constructed by Louis Weissgerber

Coordinates: 51.0432°N 114.0990°W

Sunalta Station Place is a three-story building constructed between 1904 and 1905 by Louis Weissgerber.

The structure was originally located at 325 6th Avenue West Calgary Alberta on land purchased from Lord Strathcona. This lot is now occupied by the 41 storey First Canadian Centre which was built in 1982. Sunalta Station Place was moved in 1947 to its current location at 1639 11th Ave SW by local businessman Oscar Lindquist. This lot was previously acquired by the City on January 9, 1926 for unpaid property taxes pursuant to the Tax Recovery Act of 1922 and remained vacant until 1947. Due to the significant housing demand following World War II, the building was extensively modified and utilized as a five suite apartment building. The structure functioned as an apartment building until 1996 at which time it was purchased by Calgary geologist Philip Young. The building was subsequently upgraded and converted into offices for Columbus Energy Corporation, a junior oil and gas company owned by Young.

In 2008, the structure was named Sunalta Station Place. In December 2010 the building was returned to its original use as a private residence. The building is situated within 500 metres of the new $25 Million Sunalta C-Train Station constructed to service the west leg expansion of Calgary's LRT transportation network.
