= Shaganappi Point station =

Light rail station in Calgary, Alberta, Canada

Shaganappi Point
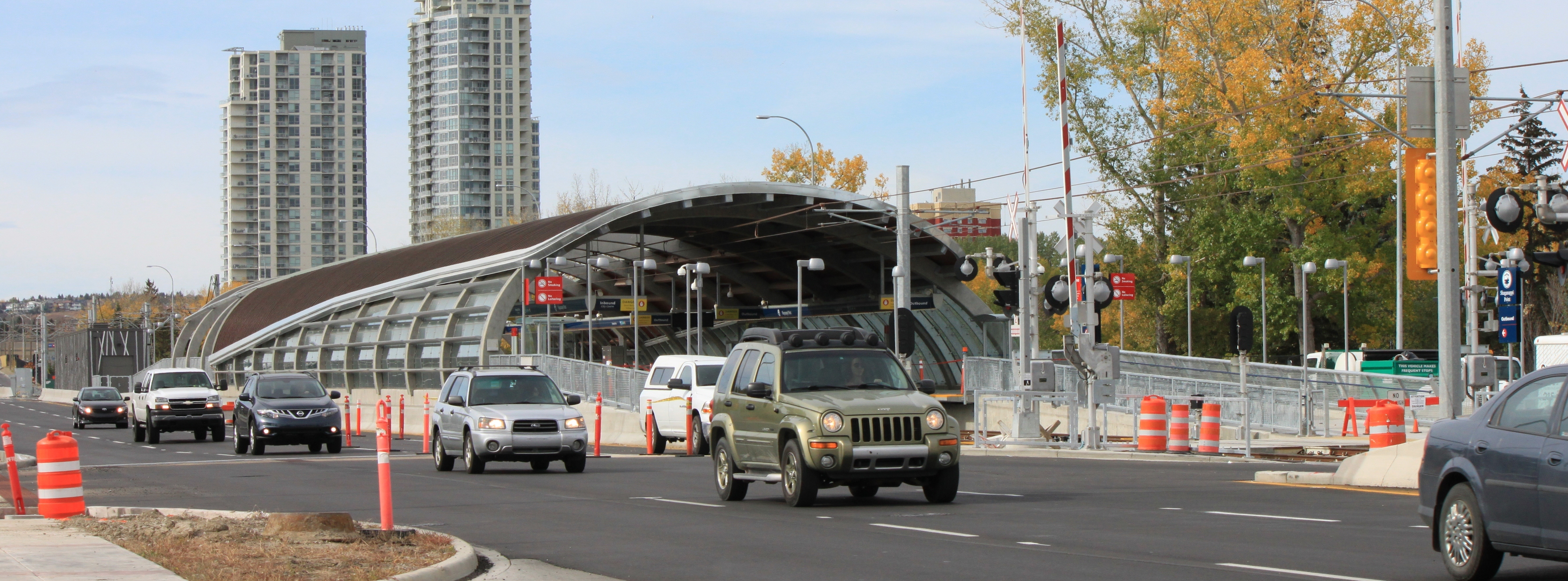

General information
- Coordinates: 51°02′30.12″N 114°07′27.18″W
- Owner: Calgary Transit
- Platforms: Side-loading platforms
- Connections: 9 Dalhousie/Chinook

Construction
- Structure type: At-grade
- Parking: None
- Accessible: yes

History
- Opened: 2012; 14 years ago

Services
Preceding station	Calgary Transit	Following station
Westbrook toward 69 Street	Blue Line	Sunalta toward Saddletowne
Location

Shaganappi Point station is a CTrain light rail station in Shaganappi, Calgary, Alberta, Canada. It is located in the median of Bow Trail, just west of 26th St. SW, 3km West of the 7 Avenue & 9 Street SW Interlocking. The second station on the West line, it opened with preview service on December 8, 2012, and opened for revenue service on December 10, 2012.

The station has side-loading platforms that are only accessed by ramps from the intersection of Bow Trail and 26 Street SW immediately east.

The 27-hole Shaganappi Point Golf Course is located near the station.

In its first year of service, Shaganappi Point served an average of 1,320 boardings per day.

The Kerby Centre (a major drop-in centre for seniors) was planned to be relocated to a location beside this LRT station by 2017 from its current location in downtown Calgary, but this plan was later dropped in favour of considering other locations. As of spring 2023, new residential development is underway north of Bow Trail.

== Transit connections ==
Bus connections to the station as of 22 December, 2025:

- 9 - Dalhousie / 9 - Chinook
