= Rosscarrock =

- Neighbourhood
- Location of Rosscarrock in Calgary
- Coordinates: 51°02′27″N 114°09′10″W
- Country: Canada
- Province: Alberta
- City: Calgary
- Quadrant: SW
- Ward: 8
- Established: 1954

Government
  - Mayor: Jeromy Farkas
  - Administrative body: Calgary City Council
  - Councillor: Nathaniel Schmidt (Independent)

Area
  - Total: 1.1 km^{2} (0.42 sq mi)
- Elevation: 1,140 m (3,740 ft)

Population (2006)
  - Total: 3,200
  - Average Income: $40,733
- Postal code: T3C
- Website: Rosscarrock Community Association

Rosscarrock is a residential neighbourhood in the southwest quadrant of Calgary, Alberta. It is bounded to the north by Bow Trail to the east by 33 Street W, to the south by 17 Avenue S and to the west by 45 Street W. The Westbrook Mall is located in the northeast corner of the neighbourhood, and it is bordered by the Shaganappi golf course.

Rosscarrock was established in 1954. It is represented in the Calgary City Council by the Ward 8 councillor.

== Demographics ==
In the City of Calgary's 2019 municipal census, Rosscarrock had a population of 3,625 living in 1,715 dwellings, a 0.3% increase from its 2018 population of 3,613. With a land area of 1.04 km^{2} (0.40 sq mi), it had a population density of 3,300/km^{2} (8,500/sq mi) in 2019.

Residents in this community had a median household income of $65,633 in 2016, and there were 27.6% low income residents living in the neighbourhood. As of 2016, 37% of the residents were immigrants. A proportion of 53.3% of the buildings were condominiums or apartments, and 65.8% of the housing was used for renting.

== Crime ==
Crime Data
Year	Crime Rate (/100 pop.)
2018	4.8
2019	6.2
2020	4.7
2021	6.1
2022	4.8
2023	5.2

== Education ==
The community is served by Rosscarrock Elementary public school, as well as by St. Michael Elementary & Junior High (Catholic, Late French Immersion, International Baccalaureate).

== See also ==
- List of neighbourhoods in Calgary
