= 10 Street SW station =

Former light rail station in Calgary, Alberta, Canada

10 Street SW
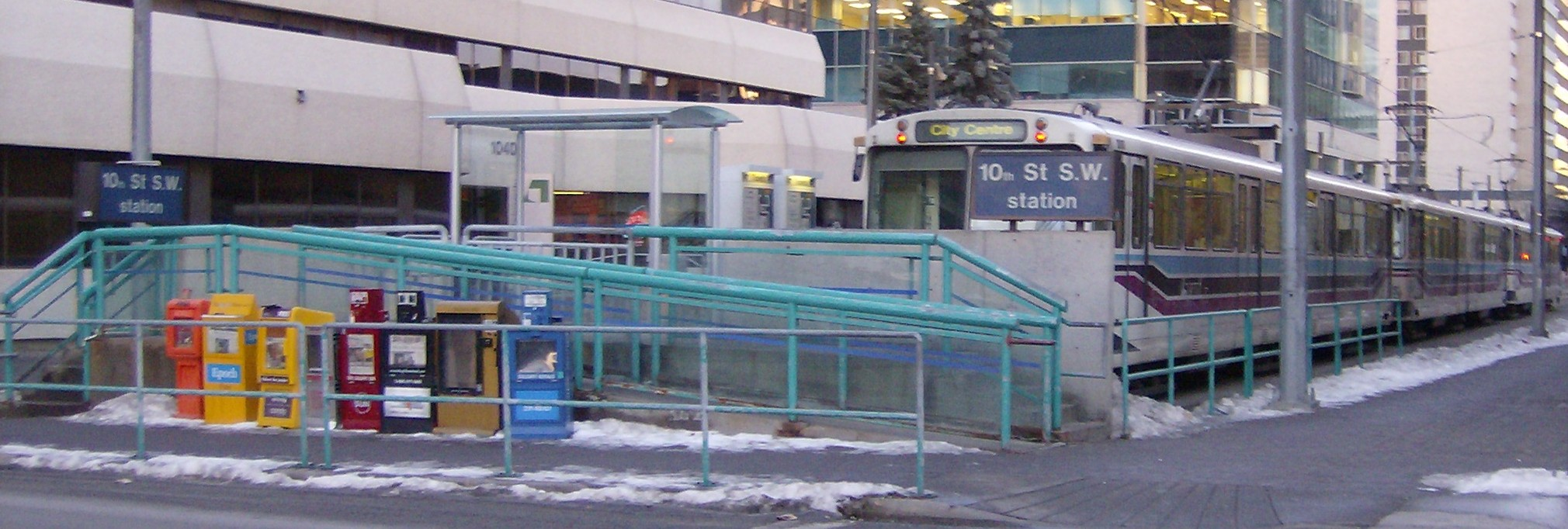

General information
- Location: 1029C - 7 Avenue SW
- Coordinates: 51°2′49.4772″N 114°5′5.2188″W
- System: Former CTrain station (7th Avenue Transit Corridor)
- Owner: Calgary Transit
- Platforms: Centre-loading platform

Construction
- Structure type: At-grade

History
- Opened: 1985
- Closed: 2012 (replaced by Downtown West–Kerby)

Former Services
Preceding station	Calgary Transit	Following station
Terminus	Blue Line	7 Street SW One-way operation
Terminus	Blue Line	8 Street SW toward Saddletowne
Location

10 Street SW station was a CTrain light rail station in Calgary, Alberta, Canada. It was the western terminus of Route 202. It was closed and replaced with Downtown West–Kerby station.

Opened in 1985 with the opening of the Northeast line, this stop was the terminus for Route 201 until the Northwest Line opened in 1987. Until the West Line to 69 Street Southwest opened in 2012, Route 202's western terminus was at this platform. In addition, some Route 201 trains going southward started trips here. It was located at the western end of the free fare zone.

Unlike other side-loading platforms on the 7 Avenue S transit mall, 10 Street station was the only centre-loading platform, allowing passengers to board on either side of the station (access to the station was offered from the nearby intersection, though users commonly jumped off the platform and walked across the street).

The 10 Street SW platform was one of six downtown platforms slated for refurbishment as part of the next phase of Calgary Transit's Seventh Avenue refurbishment project. The station underwent a design study in 2006, and at that time was chosen as the next of the downtown stations to be rebuilt and expanded to handle four car trains. Construction of the new station was deferred in 2007 with the approval of funding for the West LRT, and was constructed when the West LRT extension began construction in late 2009. The new station is located one block west of the current station and is designed as a dual side-loading station with a similar design to the rest of the refurbished downtown stations.

The platform served the Downtown West End community, both residential and businesses. A short walk from the platform is the Mewata Armoury, Kerby Centre (a major seniors facility) and Shaw Millennium skatepark. Greyhound Canada provided a shuttle service from the station to its bus depot. Once the West LRT project was completed in 2012, the shuttle ceased operation, as the new Sunalta station is located across a major street with an overpass to the bus terminal itself.

In 2012, the City of Calgary renamed the station from "10 Street Southwest" to Downtown West–Kerby station. On September 15, 2012, this station was permanently closed and removed, in preparing for the realignment of the tracks between 9 and 10 streets SW.
