= Calgary municipal railway =

Former streetcar service in Calgary, Alberta

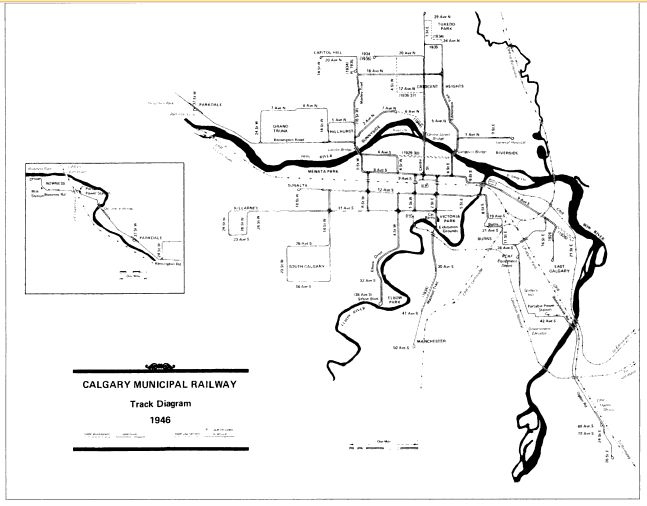
The Calgary municipal railway, in 1946, when streetcars fell from favour.

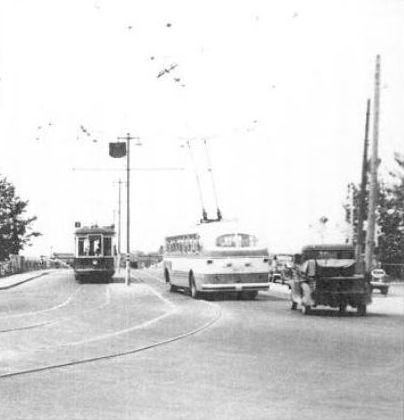
This 1947 photo shows a soon to be retired streetcar passing a new electric trolley bus, the kind of vehicle that would replace it.

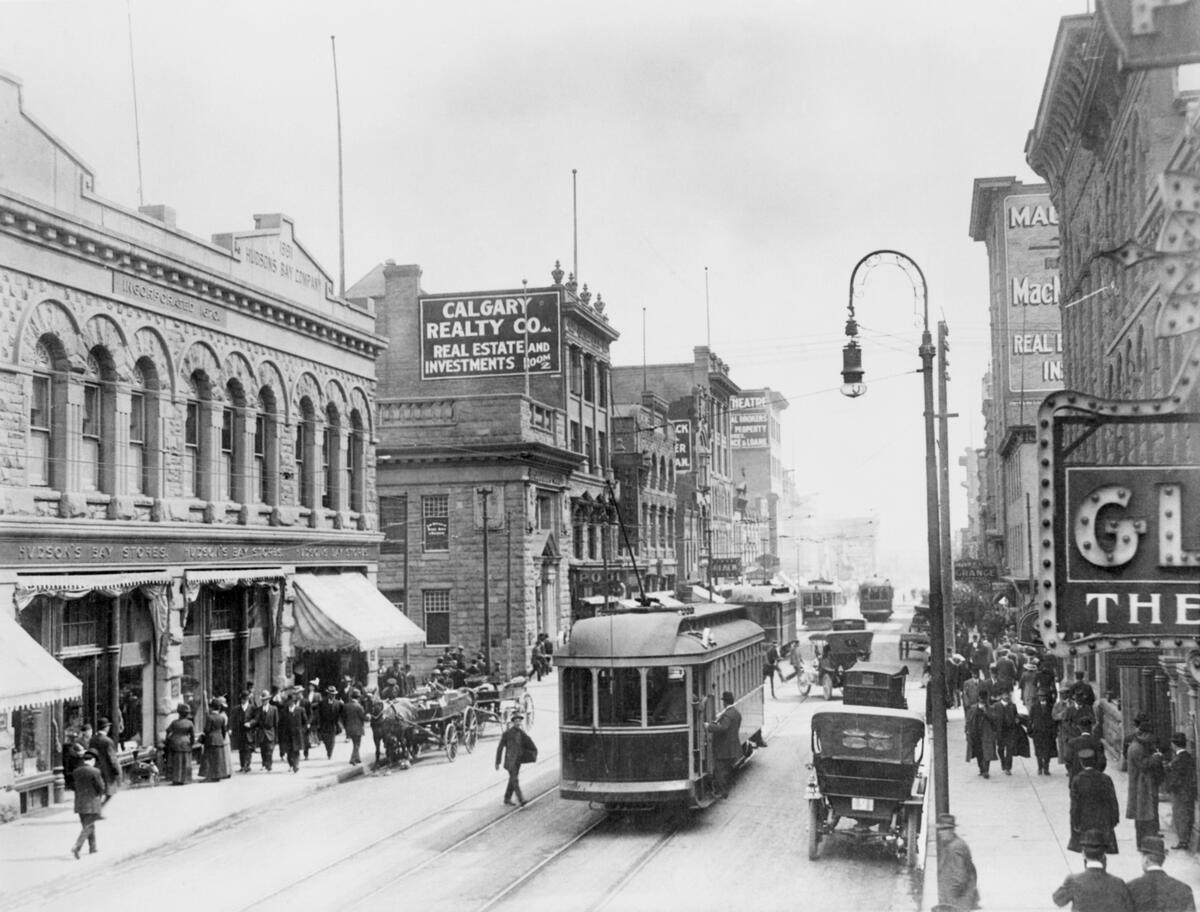
Looking east, at a streetcar, on 8th Avenue W, at Centre Street, Calgary, 1912.

The Calgary municipal railway operated a system of streetcar routes in Calgary, Alberta, from 1909, until 1950. From 1909 to 1910 the system was named the "Calgary Electric Railway". In 1946, the system was renamed the "Calgary Transit System", to reflect the decision that all the streetcars routes were to be replaced with electric trolley buses.

The Calgary Stampede grounds were the terminus of the first streetcar route.

According to Maxwell Foran and Charles Reasons, streetcars were built to working-class neighbourhoods, enabling workers to get to their workplaces, while those neighbourhoods were underserved by water and electric utilities.

== Routes ==
- 1 - Hillhurst - East Calgary
- 2 - Mount Pleasant - Elbow Park
- 3 - Tuxedo Park - Elbow Park
- 4 - Crescent Heights
- 5 - Beltline
- 6 - Killarney
- 7 - South Calgary / Marda Loop
- 8 - Sunnyside - Burns
- 9 - Riverside / Manchester
- A - Parkdale / Grand Trunk
- B - Bowness
- C - Capitol Hill - Rosedale
- D - Ogden
- S - Sunalta
