= Westbrook station (Calgary) =

Light rail station in Calgary, Alberta

Westbrook
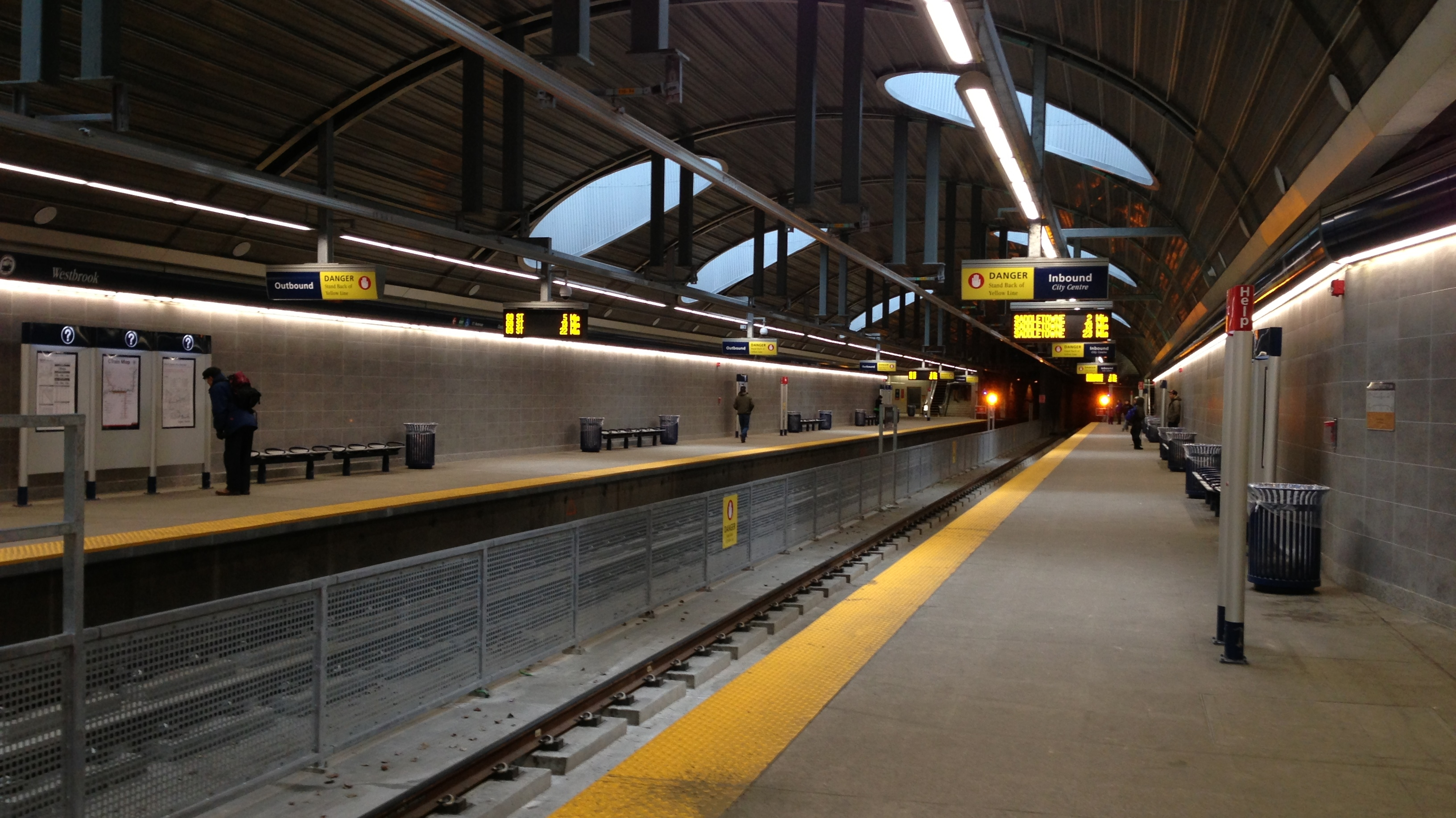

General information
- Coordinates: 51°02′20″N 114°08′12″W
- Owner: Calgary Transit
- Platforms: Side-loading platforms
- Connections: 9 Dalhousie/Chinook; 93 Wildwood/Westhills Centre/Coach Hill; 111 Old Banff Coach Road; Max Teal Douglas Glen

Construction
- Structure type: Underground
- Parking: Yes
- Accessible: yes

History
- Opened: 2012; 14 years ago

Services
Preceding station	Calgary Transit	Following station
45 Street toward 69 Street	Blue Line	Shaganappi Point toward Saddletowne
Location

Westbrook station is the third station on the West LRT line of the CTrain light rail system in Calgary, Alberta. The station, along with the rest of the line, opened on December 10, 2012. However, on December 8, 2012, it was opened as a preview for the public to use. It is located in the neighbourhood of Rosscarrock, in the Southwest quadrant of Calgary.

The station is located underground beside 33 Street SW between Bow Trail and 17 Avenue SW, 4 km from the 7 Avenue & 9 Street SW Interlocking. The station, along with associated office block above it, occupies the site of the former Ernest Manning High School, which closed in June 2011, and a former Petro-Canada service station that closed in 2009. The school and station were demolished to make room for this station and a new school (using the same name) was built 3.5 kilometres away near the 69 Street SW station. The new school opened in September 2011. The Westbrook station also offers a new BRT service to Mount Royal University and Heritage station.

The station platform is located underground, with two entrances above ground, and is the first operational underground CTrain station in Calgary. A station was planned for under Calgary's Olympic Plaza. However, only the approach tunnel exists below Calgary's Municipal Building, as part of a subway tunnel that was partially built and mothballed in the mid-1980s. The station was built with provisions for a spur line to Mount Royal University in the future.

The platform is side-loading and is connected via two entrances: the north entrance is located in the lobby of a four-storey office block constructed on the former site of the service station; the south entrance is via a standalone building. An escalator, stairs and an elevator provide access to the platform at both entrances. A small bus loop has been constructed near the north entrance which also doubles as an access road to the nearby Westbrook Mall.

In its first year of service, Westbrook served an average of 8,180 boardings per day.

The station primarily serves the communities of Spruce Cliff, Rosscarrock, and Killarney. Also, the Westbrook Mall is located near this station and the general area is part of the Westbrook Area Redevelopment Plan (ARP).

In April 2016, a Calgary Public Library branch, named the Nicholls Family Library, opened inside the main floor of the office block adjacent to the station entrance, replacing the nearby Shaganappi branch. A café operated within the library branch for a short time after its opening, but subsequently closed and was converted for further library use.

== Transit connections ==
Bus connections to the station as of 22 December, 2025:

- 9 - Chinook / 9 - Dalhousie
- 26 - Tuscany
- 93 - Coach Hill
- 111 - West Springs
- - Max Teal (Douglas Glen)
