= 6 Street SW station =

Light rail station in Calgary, Alberta, Canada

6 Street SW
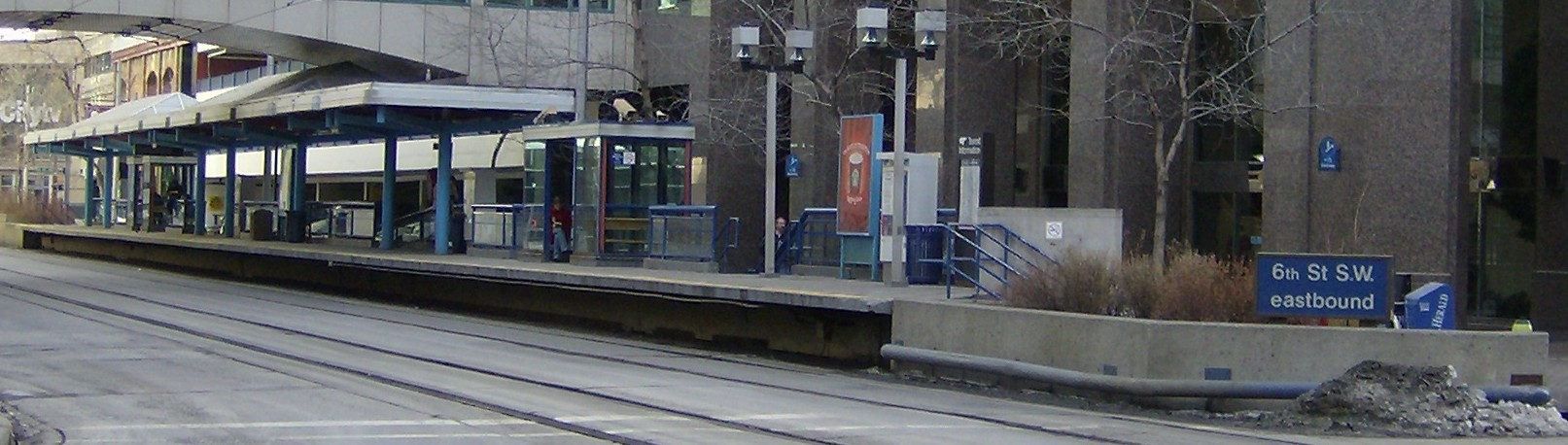

General information
- Location: 631C - 7 Avenue SW
- Coordinates: 51°02′48.4″N 114°04′29″W
- Owner: Calgary Transit
- Platforms: single side-loading platform
- Connections: 1 Bowness/Forest Lawn; 2 Kilarney-17 Avenue; 4 Huntington; 5 North Haven; 6 Killarney-26 Ave; 7 Marda Loop; 13 Altadore; 22 Richmond Road; 66 Lakeview; Max Green North Pointe; Max Yellow Woodpark

Construction
- Structure type: At-grade
- Accessible: yes

History
- Opened: 1981
- Rebuilt: 2009

Services
Preceding station	Calgary Transit	Following station
8 Street SW One-way operation	Red Line	3 Street SW toward Somerset–Bridlewood
8 Street SW One-way operation	Blue Line	3 Street SW toward Saddletowne
Location

6 Street SW station is a CTrain light rail station in downtown Calgary, Alberta, Canada. The 6 Street SW is only used by eastbound trains, with the nearest westbound stops being the 7 Street SW station and the 3 Street SW station, both of which are only served by westbound trains. The platform is located on the south side of 7 Avenue S, within the free fare zone of the CTrain and serves both routes 201 and 202.

The original 6 Street W station, located between 6 Street & 5 Street SW opened on May 25, 1981, as part of Calgary's original LRT line from 8 Street W to Anderson. As part of Calgary's 7 Avenue Refurbishment project, On April 7, 2008, the station was closed and demolished and the new station rebuilt in its place. The new station opened on March 27, 2009, just under one year after the original station closed down.

Like all refurbished 7 Avenue platforms, the entire sidewalk slopes up to the station at both ends and the platform can handle 4-car trains.

The station registered an average of 7,900 weekday boardings in 2005.

In 2008, according to the Calgary Transit Website, the daily weekday ridership remains at an unchanged rate of 7,900 boardings.

== Transit connections ==
Bus connections to the station as of 31 August, 2026:

- 1 - Forest Lawn
- 2 - Killarney-17 Avenue
- 4 - Huntington
- 5 - North Haven
- 6 - Westhills
- 7 - City Centre
- 22 - Richmond Road
- 66 - Lakeview
- - Max Green (North Pointe)
- - Max Yellow (Woodpark)
