= Westbrook Mall =

Coordinates: 51.0419°N 114.1400°W

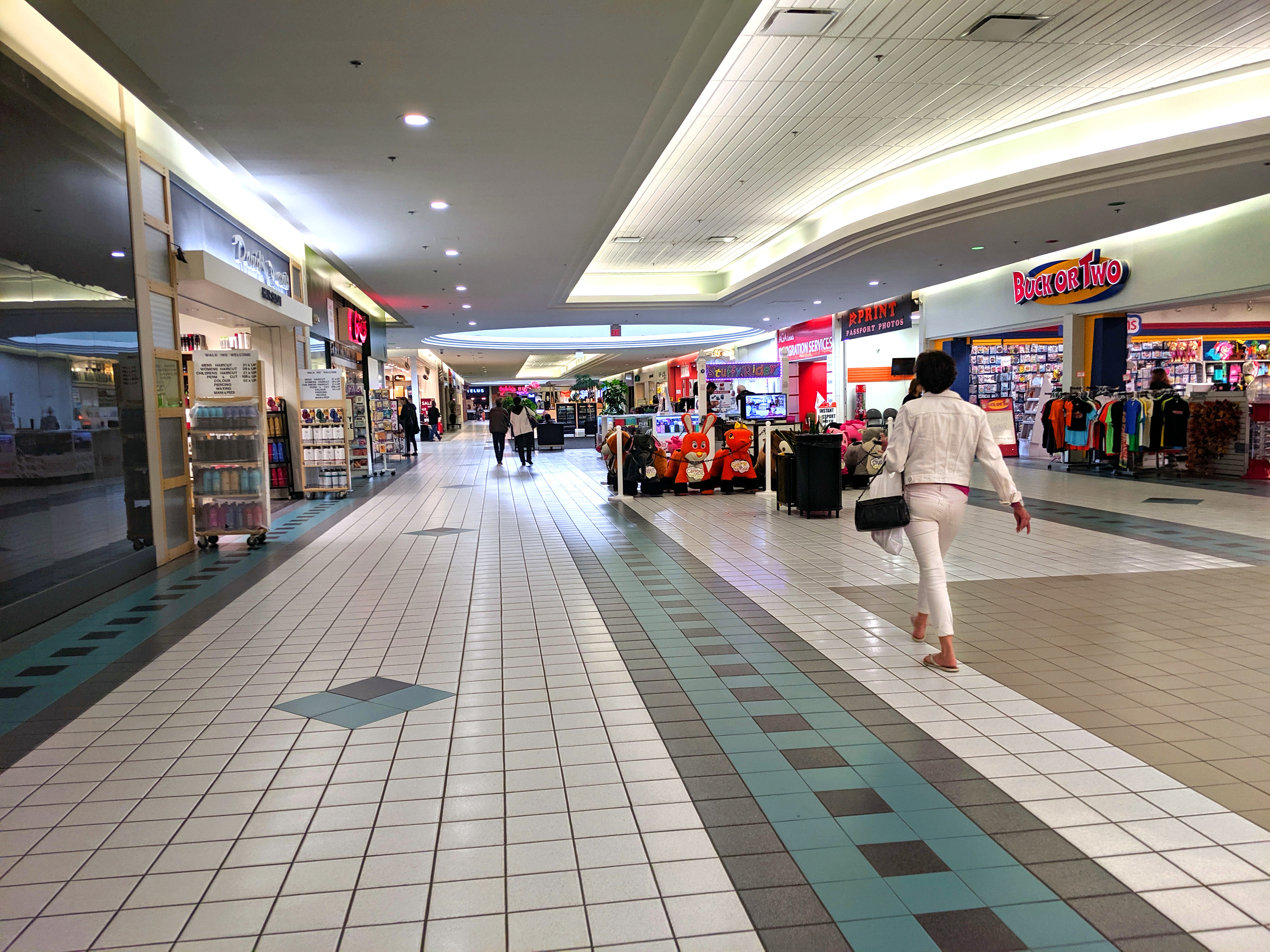
- Location: 1200 37 Street SW, Calgary, AB T3C 1S2
- Opened: 1964
- Num. of stores: 50
- Num. of anchor tenants: 4
- Floor area: 399,306 sq ft
- Floors: 1
- Public transit: Westbrook Station
- Website: https://westbrookmall.com/

Westbrook Mall is a shopping centre in Calgary, Alberta. Its anchors are Safeway and Walmart. The Westbrook Station on the West Line of the C-Train is located adjacent to the mall.

The mall was originally opened in 1964 but was renovated in 2002.

== Location ==
Westbrook Mall is located in the west part of Calgary, not far away from Shaganappi Golf Course, on the corner of Bow Trail SW and 37 St SW. The shopping mall is easily accessible by car, by bus or by the C-Train. A bus stop is located next to the mall, serving bus routes 9, 26, 93, 111 and MAX Teal. Westbrook LRT Station is a short walk away from the mall.

Tenants

- Jubilations Dinner Theatre
- Safeway
- Walmart
