= Downtown West–Kerby station =

Light rail station in Calgary, Alberta, Canada

Downtown West–Kerby
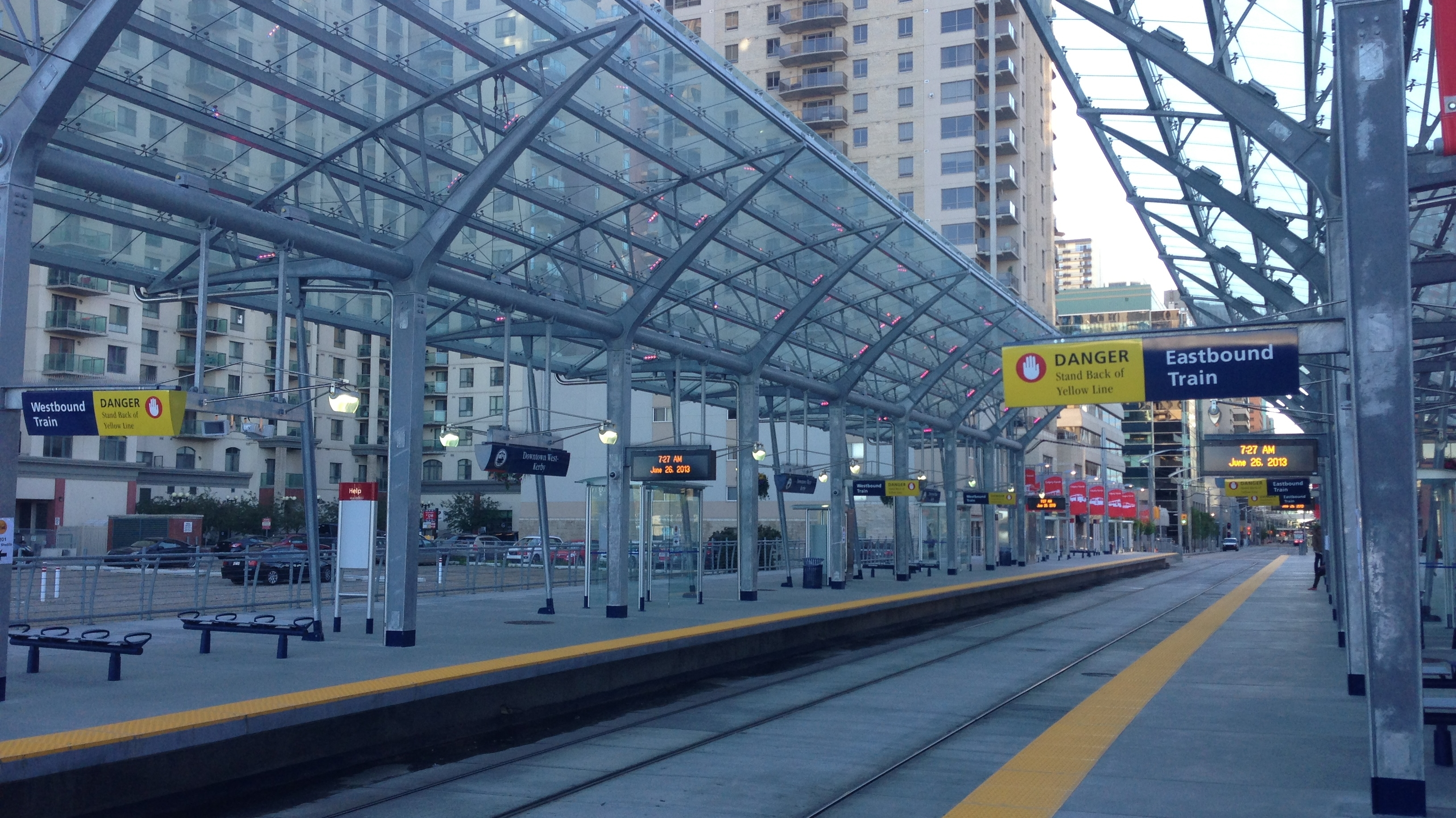

General information
- Location: 11 Street & 7 Avenue SW
- Coordinates: 51°02′49.8″N 114°05′14.34″W
- Owner: Calgary Transit
- Platforms: Side-loading platforms
- Connections: 22 Richmond Road; 65 Market Mall; 66 Lakeview

Construction
- Structure type: At grade
- Accessible: Yes

History
- Opened: 2012; 14 years ago

Services
Preceding station	Calgary Transit	Following station
Sunalta toward 69 Street	Blue Line	7 Street SW One-way operation
Sunalta toward 69 Street	Blue Line	8 Street SW toward Saddletowne
Location

Downtown West–Kerby station is a Calgary CTrain station in Calgary, Alberta, Canada. It is located in the free-fare zone on the 7 Avenue transit-only corridor. It is the only station in the downtown corridor that is exclusively for the Blue Line. A public preview occurred on December 8, 2012, and the station opened for revenue service on December 10, 2012.

This station replaces the former centre-loading 10 Street SW platform and relocated one block to the west. Initially, the name of this new dual side-loading platform was to be just 11 Street SW. However, Calgary City Hall changed the name to its present form because of the history of the Kerby family name in this location and the proximity to the Kerby Centre (a major social services centre primarily for seniors). The only other two-platform station in downtown is the City Hall station at the eastern end of the 7 Avenue SW transit mall. As part of the Calgary Transit Seventh Avenue refurbishment project, Downtown West–Kerby has been built to accommodate 4-car consists.

On March 22, 2023, as part of an attempt to deal with crime along the CTrain system, every station between City Hall station and Downtown West–Kerby would have the lighting and cameras upgraded.

This station mainly serves the Downtown West End community, both residential and businesses.

== Crime ==
A woman said she was approached by an unknown man at roughly 12:30 PM on November 1, 2017, on the platform of Downtown West–Kerby station. Police say the man was asking the woman for information about the train schedule, when he allegedly started to follow the woman and unwantedly kiss the woman multiple times on her neck and cheek. The woman pushed the man away but the man continued to touch her until she pushed past him onto an incoming train. The woman also mentioned that the man also approached another woman on the platform, which security camera footage confirmed that the man had approached two women on the C-Train platform.

49 year old Russell David Younker was stabbed to death at the Downtown West–Kerby station when getting into a heated fight at roughly 6:20 PM on April 15, 2021.

== Notable places nearby ==
- Mewata Armoury
- Shaw Millennium skatepark
- The Kerby Centre
- The Chinese Consulate-General office at 6 Avenue SW (1 block north) and between 9 Street SW and 10 Street SW
- Athabasca University (Calgary Campus)

== Transit connections ==
Bus connections to the station as of 31 August, 2026:

- 22 - Richmond Road
- 65 - Market Mall
- 66 - Lakeview
