= Calgary Transit =

Public transit service in Alberta, Canada

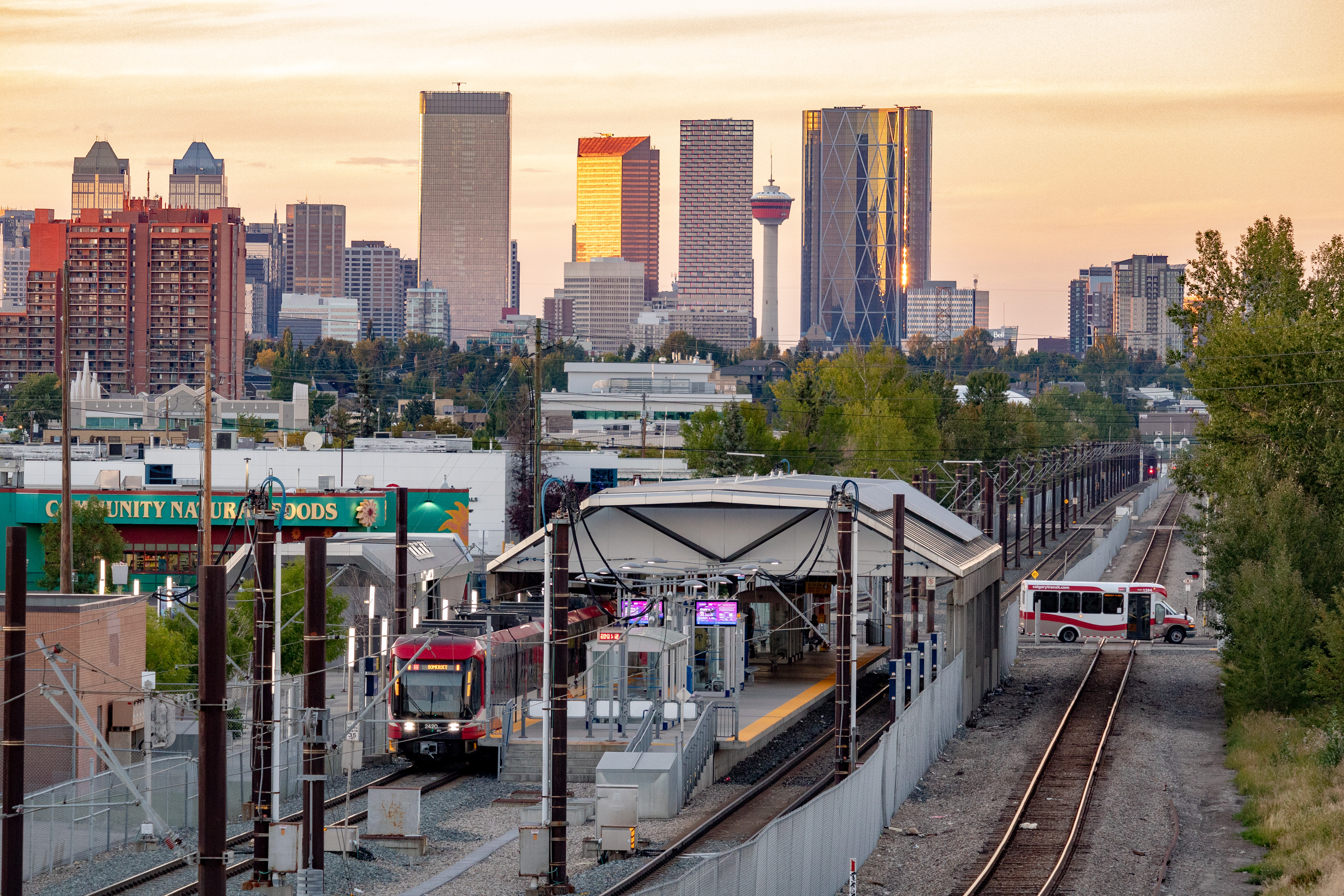
- CTrain and buses at Chinook station
- Parent: City of Calgary Transportation Dept.
- Founded: July 5, 1909
- Service area: Calgary, Alberta
- Service type: Bus and light rail
- Routes: 265 (147 regular, 116 school express, 2 LRT)
- Stops: 6,151
- Stations: 45 LRT stations
- Fleet: 1,101 buses 258 light rail vehicles
- Daily ridership: 396,300 (weekdays, Q2 2026)
- Annual ridership: 144,385,200 (2025)
- Fuel type: Bus: diesel, gasoline, compressed natural gas LRT: electric (600 V DC)
- Director: Sharon Fleming
- Website: calgarytransit.com

Calgary Transit is a public transit agency owned and operated by the city of Calgary, Alberta, Canada. It comprises the CTrain, a light rail system with 2 lines and 45 stations, and a bus network that spans 265 routes and serves over 6,000 stops. The agency also operates bus rapid transit and paratransit service in the city. In 2025, Calgary Transit had a ridership of 144,385,200, or about 396,300 per weekday as of the second quarter of 2026.

== History ==
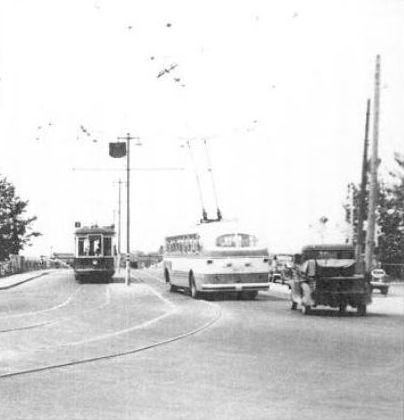
This 1947 image shows an older streetcar vehicle passing one of the new electric trolleybuses that replaced all the streetcars.

What would eventually become Calgary Transit began as the Calgary Street Railway on July 5, 1909, with twelve electric streetcars serving what was at the time a city of 30,000. This streetcar service expanded throughout the next thirty years (including the Depression) until 1946, when the company was renamed to Calgary Transit System as electric trolleybus vehicles began replacing the local streetcars. Eventually the electric trolley lines were phased out together — to be replaced by diesel buses. In 1972, CTS assumed its current name of Calgary Transit.

Between the early 1970s and 2000, Calgary Transit had a three tier bus service. Standard bus routes were identified with white bus stop signs. Blue Arrow bus routes, marked by blue signs, provided limited stops, and all day service to suburban neighbourhoods from the city centre. Express service was indicated with red signs and provided extremely limited bus service to the far reaches of the city during peak hours only. These tiers have been slowly phased out, since Calgary Transit began expanding CTrain lines and capacity, and implementing BRT service. The last Blue Arrow route was cancelled in December 2019. Express routes now appear side by side on the same signs as regular routes. MAX routes appear on a separate white and grey sign, while non-MAX BRT lines (routes 300, 301, 302, and 305) appear on red and white signs.

On July 18, 2007, Calgary Transit officially unveiled a new red and white livery for its CTrain, articulated buses and every new bus or train coming into the system.

In 2012, Calgary Transit planners presented mayor Naheed Nenshi's council with a tentative 30-year plan 'RouteAhead' to enhance the capacities of Calgary Transit.

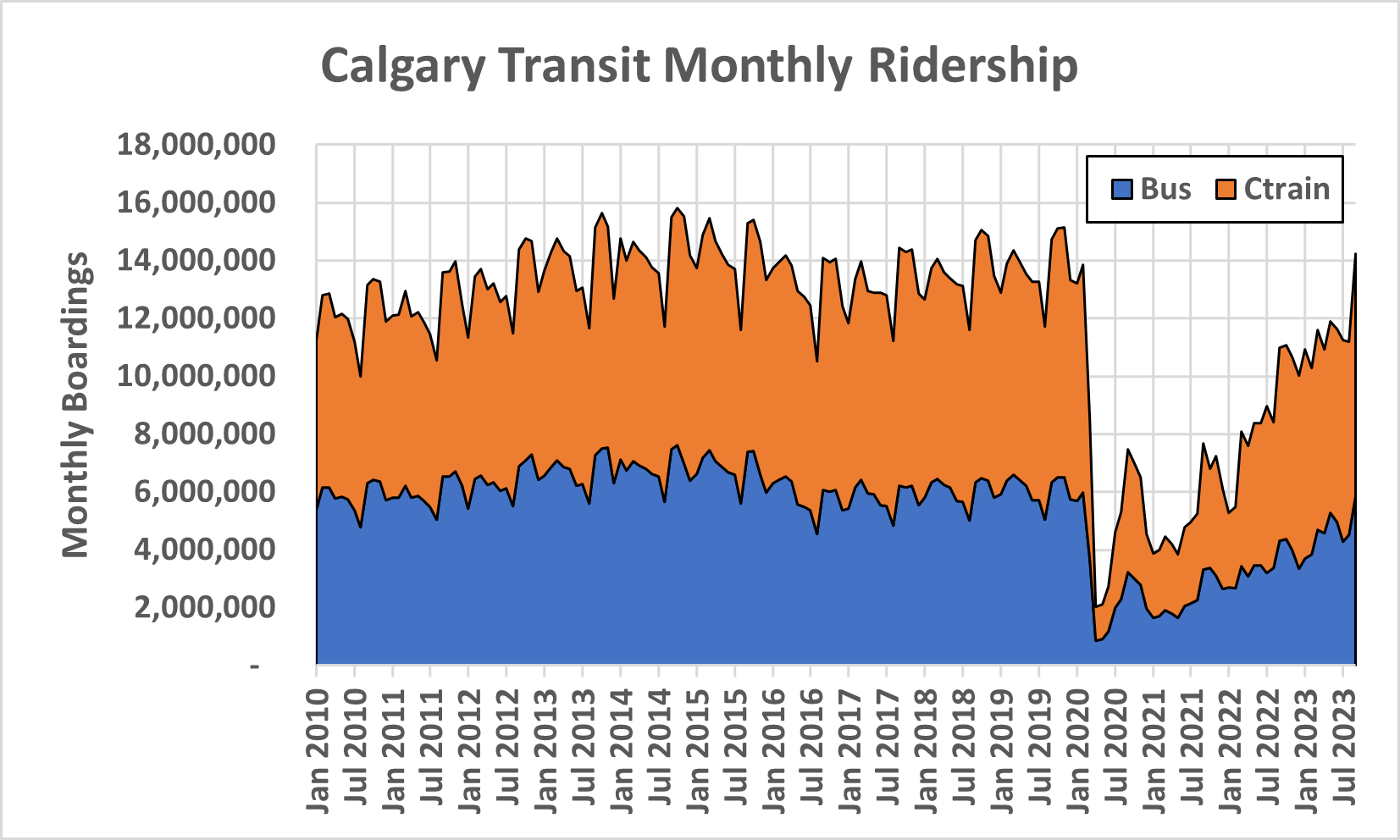
Calgary Transit Monthly Boardings, 2010 to September 2023.

== Services ==
The CTrain system along with several mainline bus routes provide the backbone of the system while many feeder bus routes and express services act to complement this backbone service. Service frequency on the CTrain and busier bus routes is typically from 5–30 minutes with operating hours of about 5 am – 2 am. Most feeder bus routes run at 15–45 minute intervals with similar operating hours on most routes and reduced on others. In addition there are many rush hour only services, some are feeder routes and some are express routes, these usually run 10–30 minutes apart.

=== CTrain light rail ===
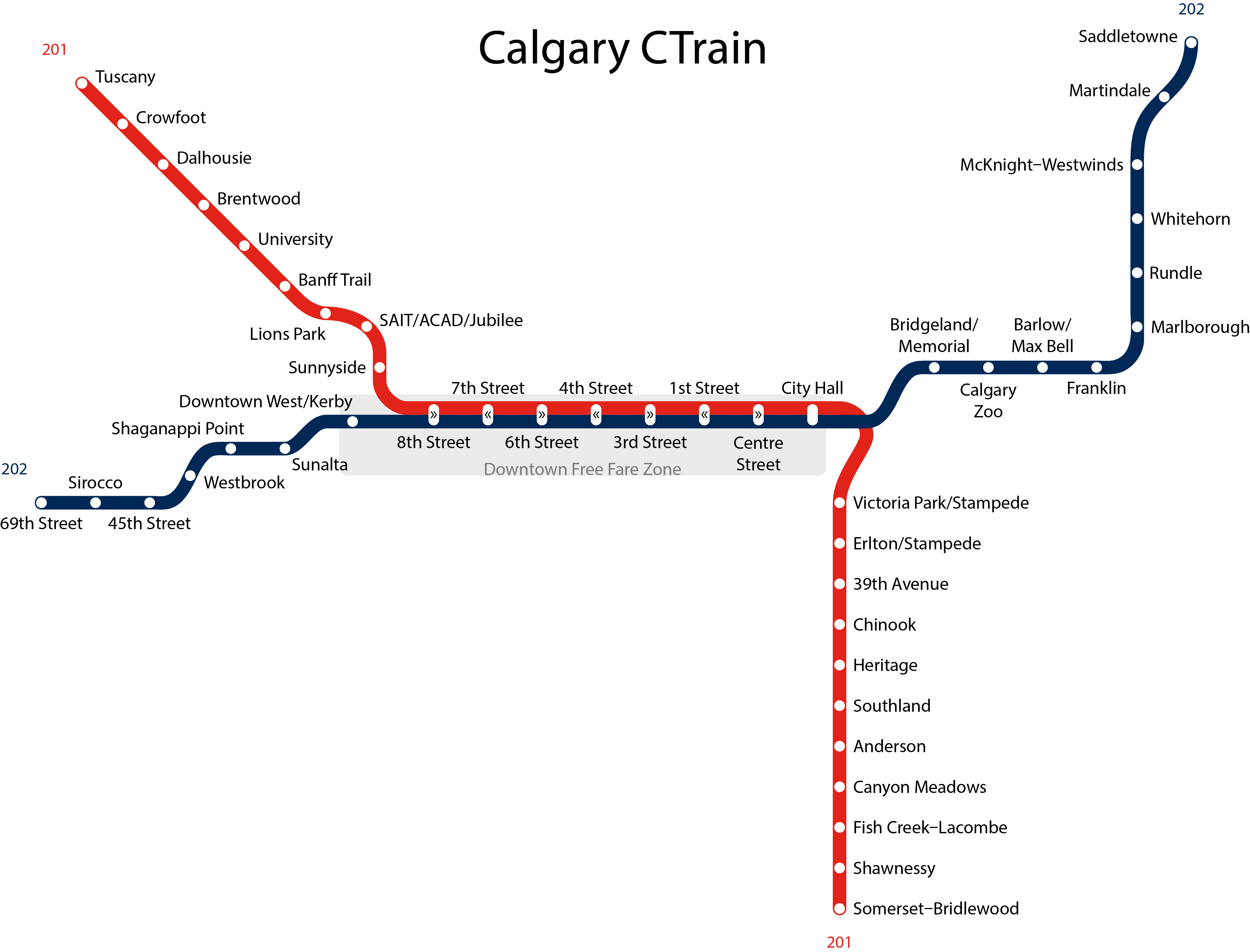
Calgary Light Rail System Map

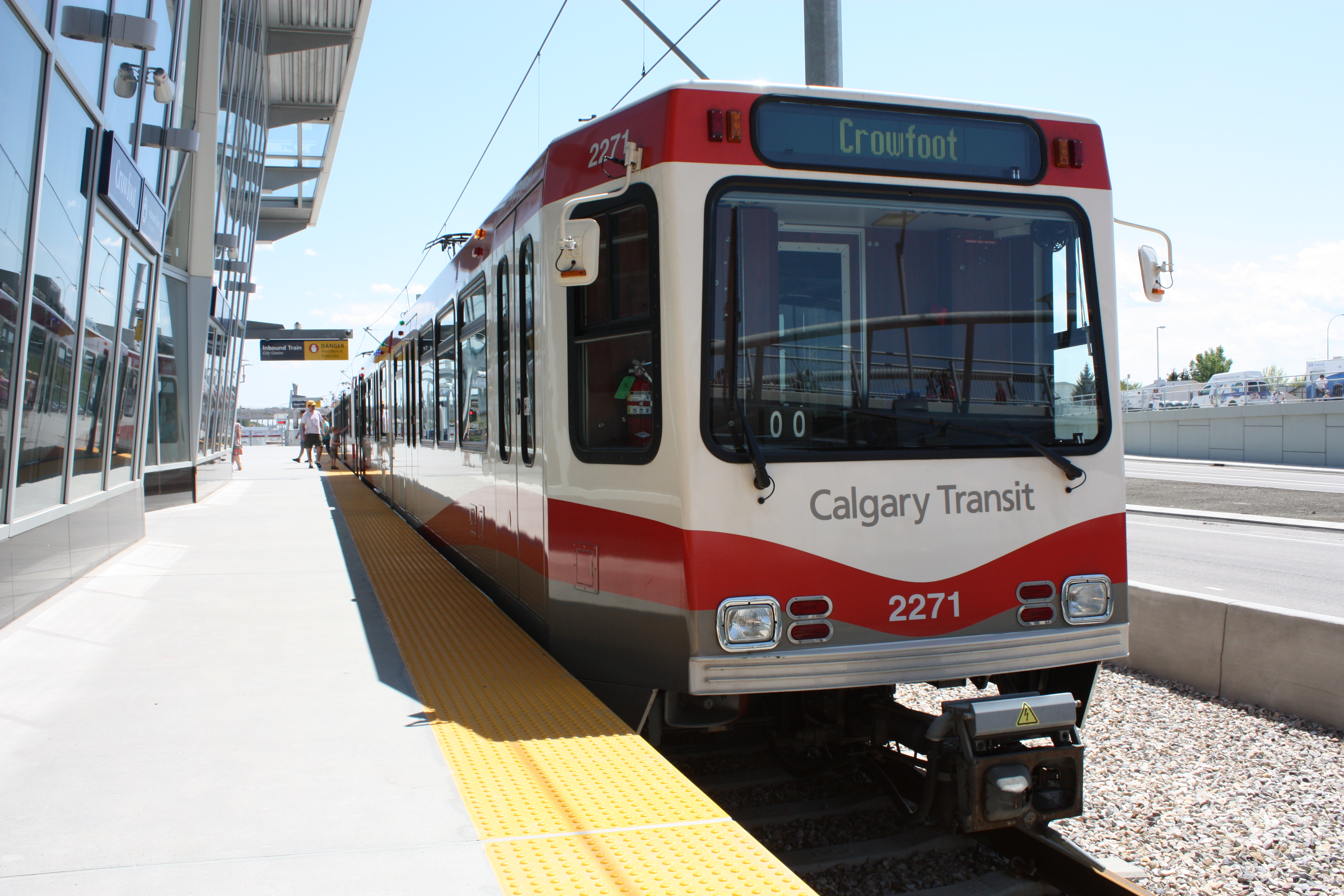
A CTrain at Crowfoot station

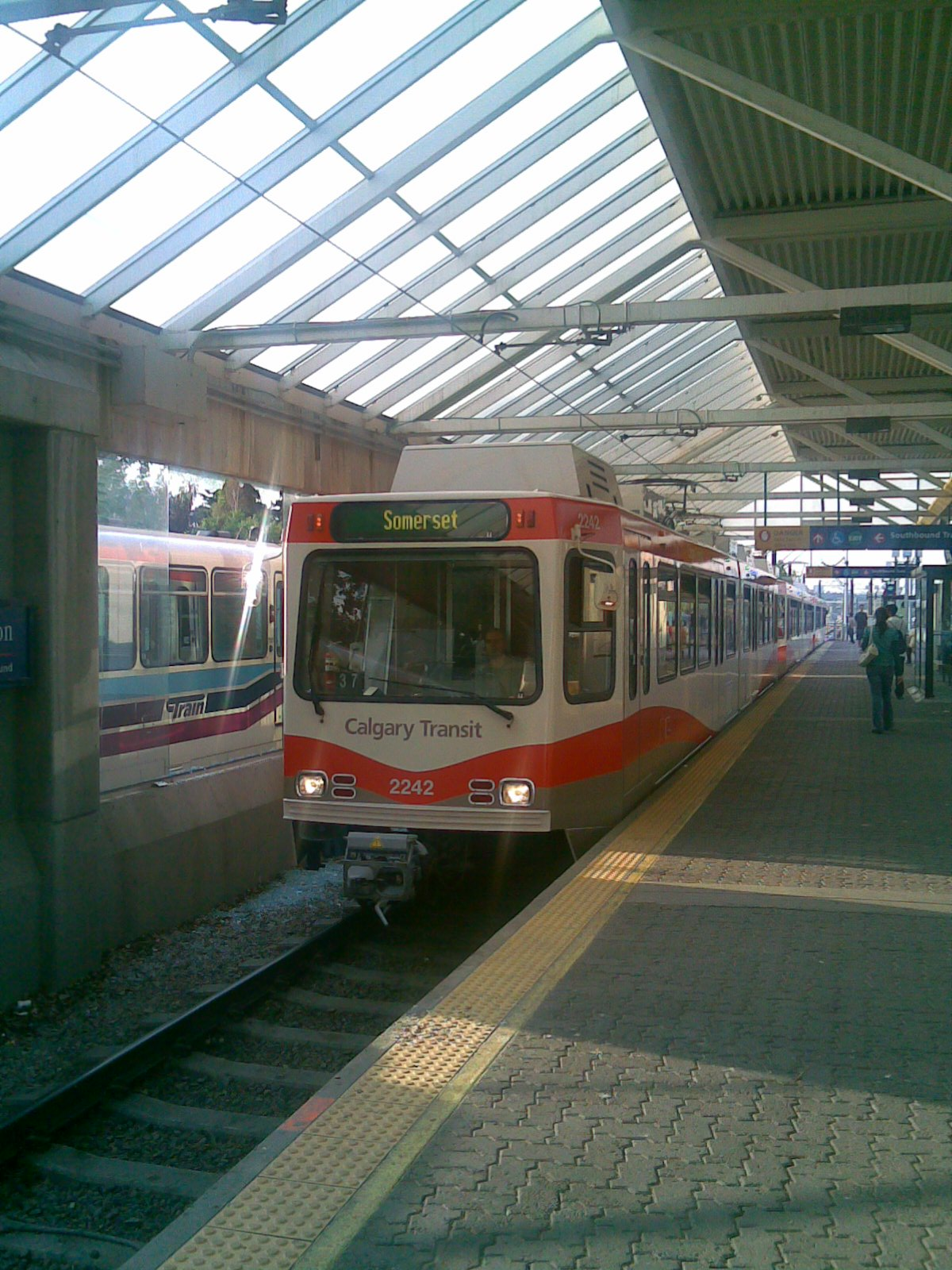
Train in red and white livery arriving at Anderson station

On May 25, 1981, Calgary Transit became one of the first transit systems in North America (behind Edmonton LRT which opened in 1978) to operate a light rail system — the CTrain, on which construction had begun in 1978. The original line (referred to internally as the Red Line, and externally as Route 201) ran from Anderson station (just north of Anderson Road in the south end of the city) to 8th St SW in Downtown Calgary. On April 27, 1985, a northeastern-bound line (Blue Line/Route 202) was opened, running from 8th St SW to Whitehorn station (just south of the intersection of McKnight Boulevard and 36th Street in the northeastern quadrant of the city), and on September 4, 1987, a northwestern-bound line (C-Line / part of Route 201) was opened in time for the 1988 Winter Olympics, running from downtown to University station (directly east of the University of Calgary campus, between 24th and 32nd Avenue on Crowchild Trail).

On September 3, 1990, a 1 km extension of the northwest line to Brentwood station (south of Brisebois Drive on Crowchild Trail) was opened; on October 9, 2001, two new stations — Canyon Meadows station (north of Canyon Meadows Drive and west of Macleod Trail) and Fish Creek–Lacombe station (south of Bannister Road and west of Macleod Trail) were added to the south line; on December 15, 2003, Dalhousie station (south of 53rd Street in the median of Crowchild Trail) was added to the northwestern line. On June 28, 2004, two new stations for the south line opened: Shawnessy station (south of a brand new interchange at Macleod Trail and Shawnessy Boulevard) and Somerset–Bridlewood station (south of 162nd Avenue and just north of Shawville Gate). On December 17, 2007, an extension was made to the Route 202 northeast line (first extension ever on the history of the line) from Whitehorn to the new McKnight–Westwinds station. On June 15, 2009, Crowfoot station was added on the northwest line located directly west of Crowfoot Town Centre in the median of Crowchild Trail.

On August 27, 2012, Martindale and Saddletowne stations were added to the northeast line, bringing the total number of stations on this line to 10. On December 10, 2012, the West LRT opened, with six new stations and Downtown West–Kerby station in downtown. Since it is Calgary's newest LRT line in 25 years, it is an extension of Route 202 (Blue Line). After this opening, the CTrain system's total length is now 56.2 kilometres (34.9 mi) long.

Future extensions include the North Central line and the Southeast line (together running as the Green Line) running from north of North Pointe Bus Terminal, down Centre Street, through downtown, into the communities of Ogden, Douglasdale and McKenzie in the southeastern portion of the city, finally ending at the South Health Campus in Seton. Phase one of the North Central Line will travel from Eau Claire downtown to Shepard in the SE. This is seen as the most complex portion of the line, requiring tunneling through downtown as well as a large elevated portion. Construction started in 2018 on works to enable future rail construction.

=== MAX bus rapid transit ===
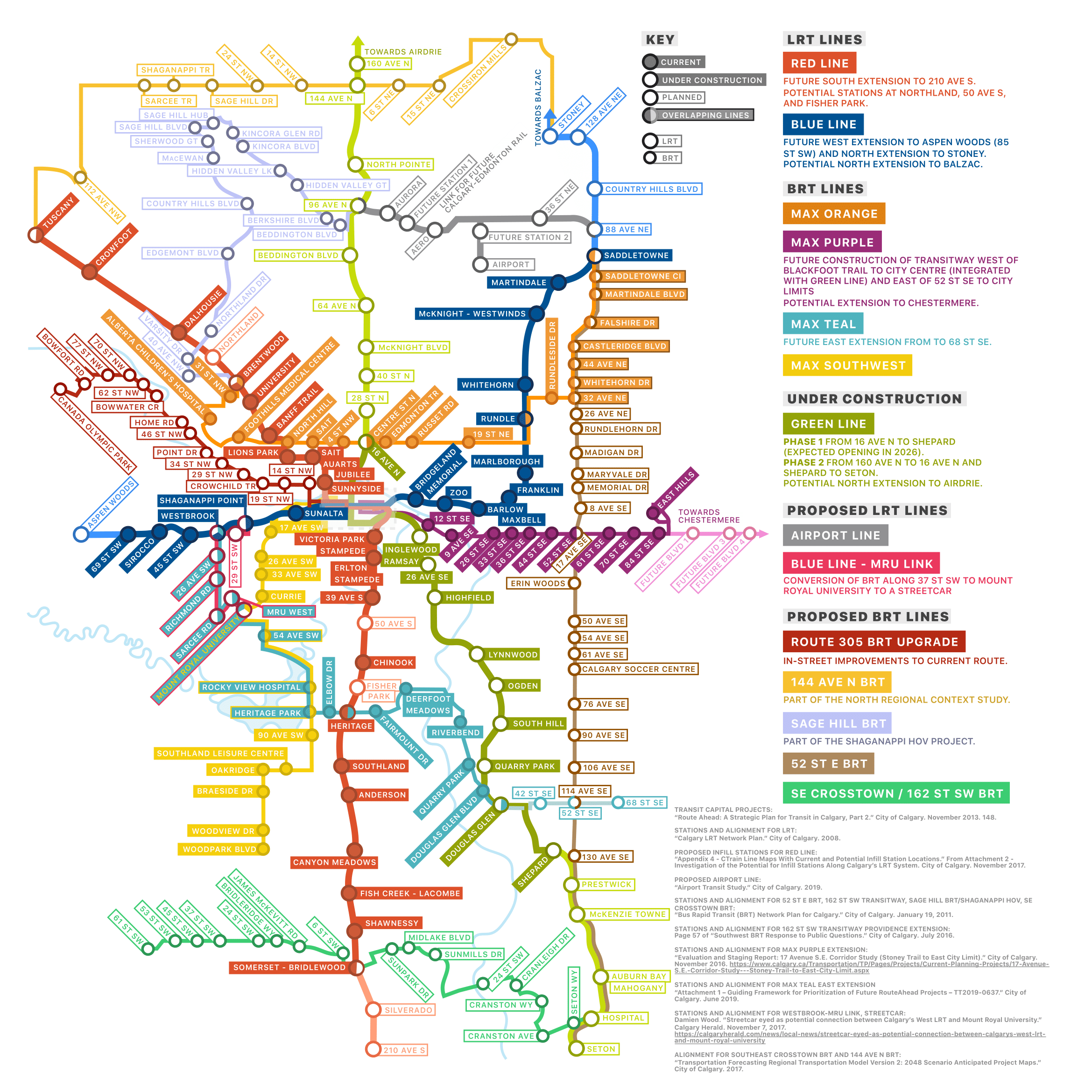
Proposed and planned transit projects in Calgary, as of 2013

The MAX bus rapid transit system comprises five routes that are branded with color names similar to CTrain. It debuted in November 2018 with three routes, including one corridor that had previously been branded as bus rapid transit, as part of a $304 million plan to improve transit service in areas without light rail access. The MAX corridors have a higher frequency and fewer stops than normal bus routes and include larger stations, bus lanes in some sections, and transit signal priority.

Earlier bus rapid transit lines had been launched from 2004 to 2009 on several corridors that had been identified for future CTrain service. A formal bus rapid transit system with nine routes was proposed in a 2011 plan that was approved by the city council. A route serving Calgary International Airport was launched in 2011.

=== Bus routes ===
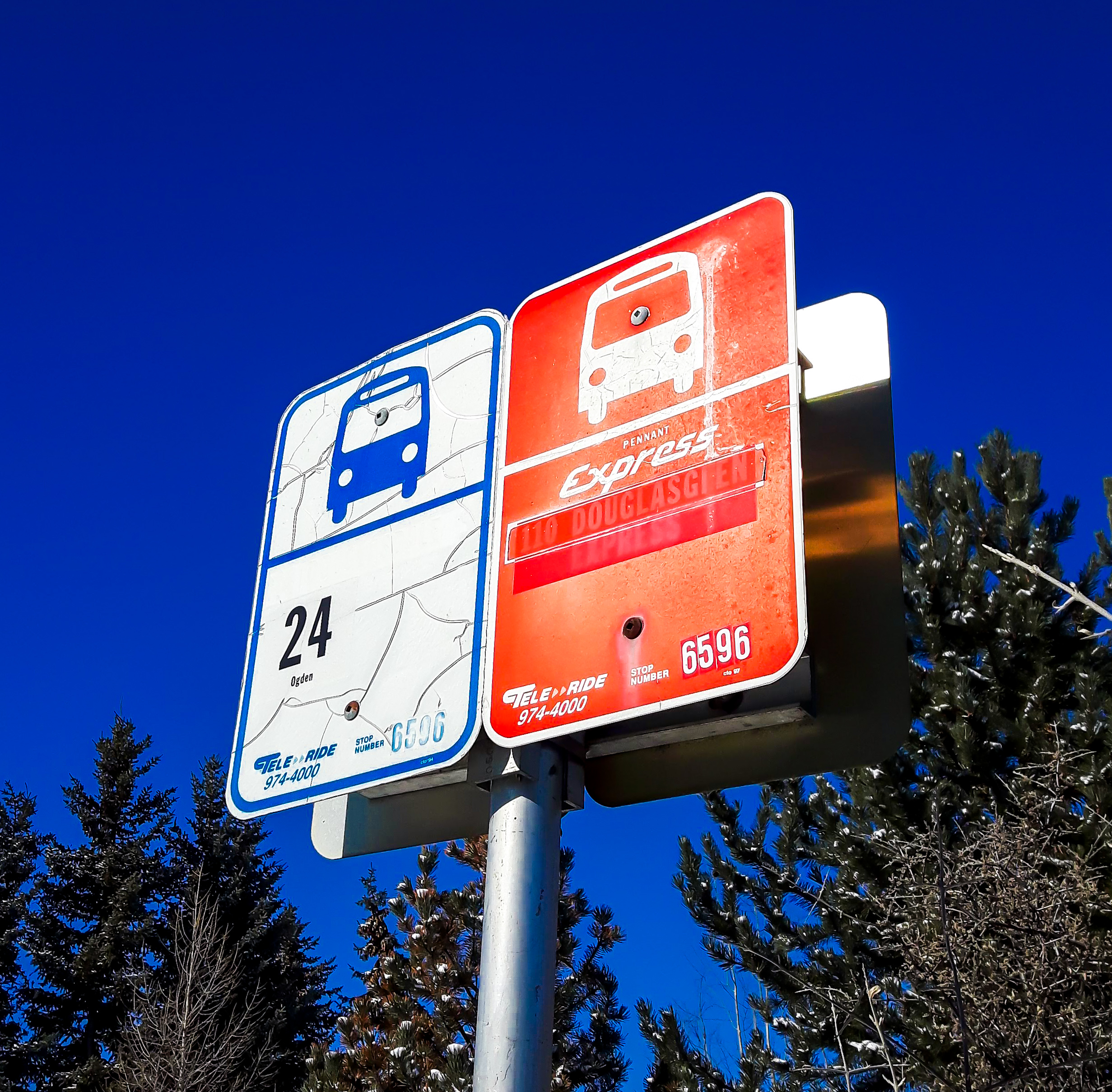
Archaic signs. Left: White sign, for regular routes. Right: Red sign, for express routes

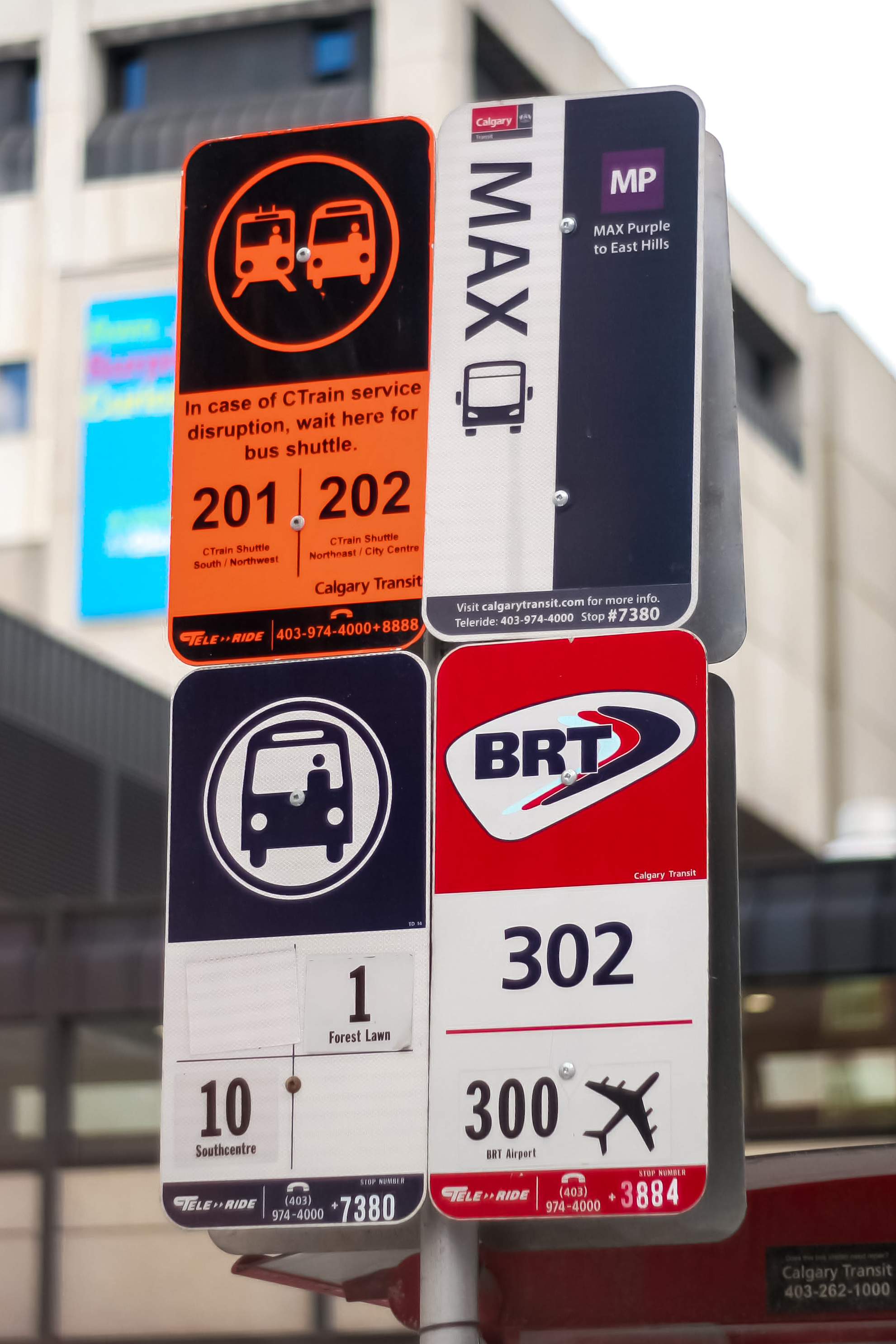
The current styles of bus stop signs in Calgary. Clockwise from top right: CTrain replacement shuttle, MAX BRT, non-MAX BRT, and a regular route sign.

Calgary Transit has 265 bus routes.

== Current service and fleet ==
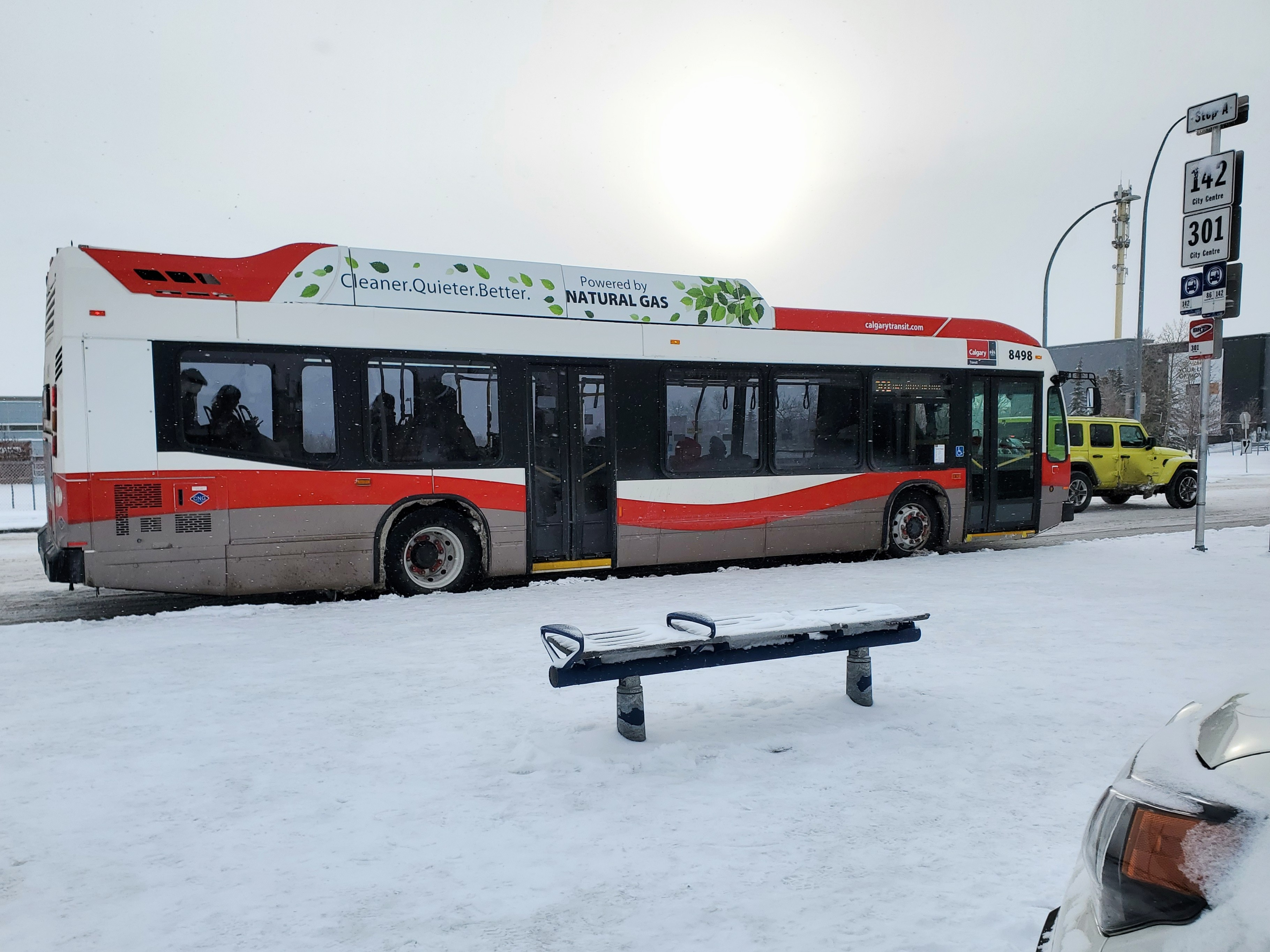
The NovaBus LFS CNG forms the newest part of the CT fleet, with all units sporting the most updated livery.

Calgary Transit operates 147 regular scheduled bus routes as well as over 150 school express or special routes using over 1,000 vehicles, all of which are low floor and wheelchair accessible, and most of which have bicycle racks. Vehicle models used include the 40-foot (12 m) New Flyer D40LF, D40LFR, XD40, XN40, as well as the Nova Bus LFS diesel and LFS CNG. The 60-foot (18 m) articulated bus fleet is composed of the New Flyer D60LFR and XD60. Community Shuttle, which provides scheduled local service with smaller buses, is currently made up of ARBOC Freedom vehicles.

The light rail vehicle (LRV) fleet includes the system's original Siemens–Duewag U2 cars, 110 Siemens SD-160s, and 69 Siemens S200s. Calgary Transit's 72 original style SD160s were delivered in three orders between 2000 and 2007. In June 2010, 38 new restyled Siemens SD160s, featuring factory equipped AC and various cosmetic and technical changes over the previous series, began to arrive. The first of the Siemens S200 cars entered service in July 2016.

== Fares ==
Calgary Transit currently operates as a single fare zone, with a flat rate fare for all standard service including bus, BRT, and the CTrain. As of January 2026, a single adult fare is $4.00, or $2.65 for youth. Children under 12 can ride for free. Books of 10 tickets are available at par to 10 fares. Monthly passes are also available, with youth passes for $86.00, and adult passes for $126.00. Seniors (65 and over) pay $169.00 for a yearly pass which is valid from July 1 to June 30 of the following year and which entitles them to travel at any time. Occasionally sponsors allow for free travel across the network for one day, such as New Year's Eve 2023 which was funded by Toronto-Dominion Bank. Travel between all CTrain stations along 7th avenue downtown is free. In order to transfer from one transit vehicle to another, proof of fare from the CTrain, or a transfer from a bus is required. A transfer or proof of fare is valid for 90 minutes from the time of issue, for any transit service (including stopovers). Fare inspections take place on the CTrain.

In cooperation with many of the post-secondary schools located in the city, a Universal Pass (U-Pass) program is offered to all students, paid as part of their tuition.

The MyFare app, available since 2020, is a fare payment system for mobile devices. It is based Masabi's Justride platform and allows for users to purchase most types of fare media and activate them for use.

Fare table
| Fare Type | Price |
|---|---|
| Cash Fare or Adult Single Ticket | $4.00 |
| Youth Cash Fare or Youth Single Ticket | $2.65 |
| Children Under 12 | Free |
| Day Regular Adult Pass | $11.60 |
| Day Youth Pass | $8.50 |
| UPass | $160.00 |

=== Connect Card ===
The "Connect Card" is the name of Calgary Transit's proposed electronic fare smart-card. After two years of work and after installing smart-card readers on every bus and at all CTrain stations that were supposed to start working in the summer of 2012, Calgary Transit cancelled the deal with its contractor, Spain-headquartered Telvent. The City of Calgary announced on November 8, 2012, that crews will remove the new smart-card machines out of all Calgary Transit 1,000 city buses and 160 LRT pay machines after repeated glitches and delays. About one year later, the City then announced that they would relaunch the initiative, again with Telvent as the provider. In June 2015, the City of Calgary decided to scrap the Connect Card project and attempt to recover costs from Schneider Electric (formerly Telvent).

Following the failure to implement CC, Calgary Transit reported in November 2016 that they were in contact with their counterparts in Vancouver, Edmonton, Salt Lake City and Philadelphia to study how the cities implemented their transit smart card systems.

== Facilities ==
There are six major Calgary Transit facilities to store and maintain the transit fleet, as well as run several operations departments to keep the system running:

- Spring Gardens Administrative Building/Garage: Conventional and shuttle bus storage, administration, machine shop, body shop, heavy duty diesel mechanical shop, bus operator training, maintenance and equipment training
- Victoria Park Garage: Articulated and Conventional bus storage, body shop, call centre, heavy duty mechanical shop, bus and rail operations control centre, protective services
- Anderson Garage: Conventional bus storage, LRV storage, LRV light/heavy duty maintenance, bus/LRV body shop, machine shop, heavy duty diesel mechanical shop, LRV operator training, maintenance and equipment training
- Haysboro LRV Storage Site: LRV storage
- Oliver Bowen Maintenance Facility: LRV storage, LRV light/heavy duty maintenance, machine shop
- Stoney Garage: Conventional CNG bus storage and CNG fueling station.

== Public Safety and Enforcement ==
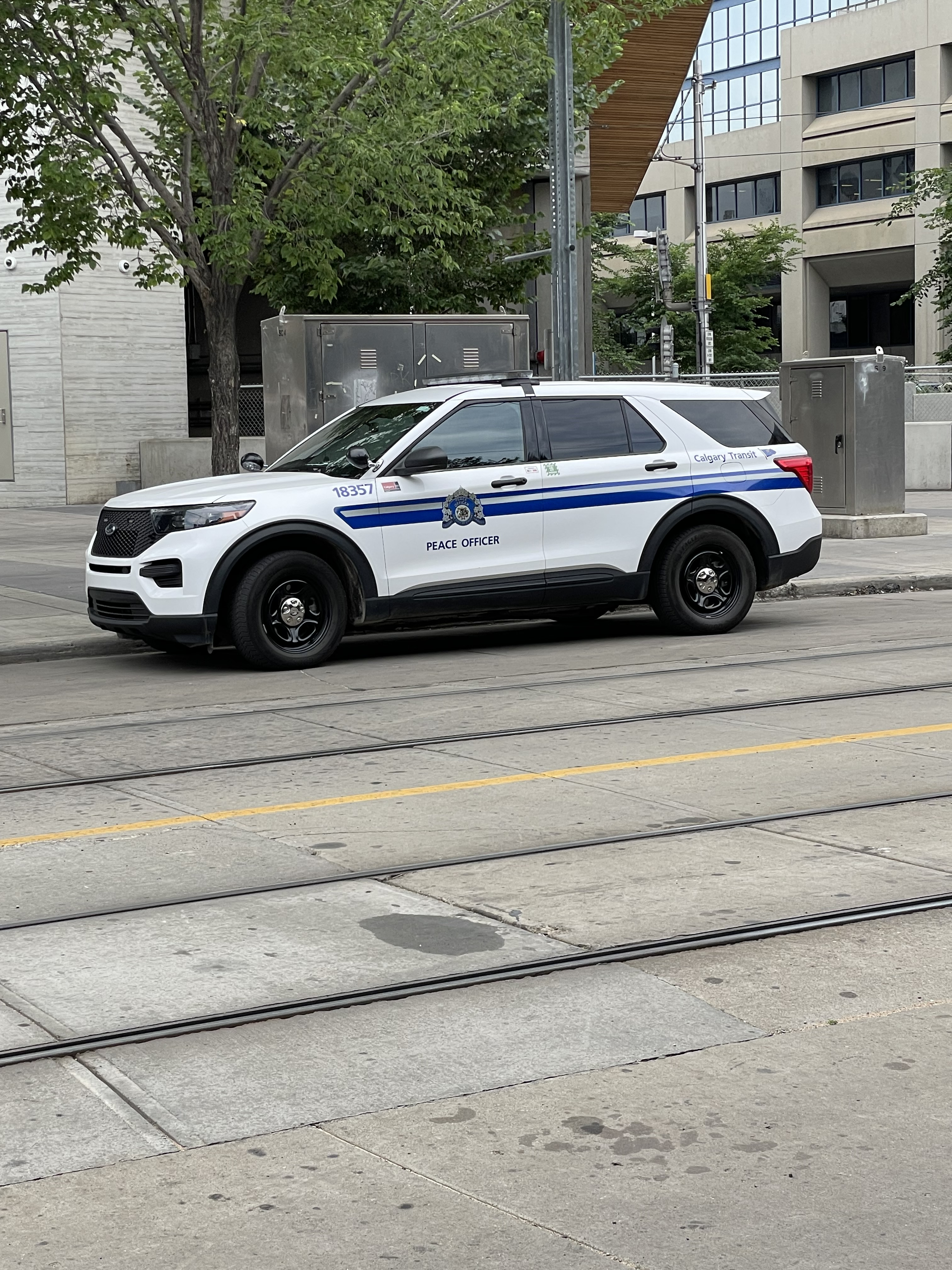
A Ford Police Interceptor Utility used by Calgary Transit Peace Officers.

The Calgary Transit Public Safety and Enforcement Section (formerly the Calgary Transit Protective Services) is the enforcement agency for Calgary Transit. Formed in 1981, as special constables under the Police Act of Alberta, special constables had most authorities given to regular police constables. In 2008, the new Peace Officer Act replaced the old police act. Officers were then redesignated as peace officers under this act and given full peace officer powers in the province of Alberta. All officers are equipped with handcuffs, OC spray, collapsible batons and protective body armour.

The main duties of a Calgary Transit peace officer are to protect the public using the system, its employees and its assets. Officers must respond to requests for assistance from customers and employees which include arresting persons found committing criminal offences (indictable or summary conviction) on or in relation to Calgary Transit facilities, vehicles and property. Other duties includes public education, regular patrols of the transit system, customer relations and issuance of violation tickets.

PS&E officers have a Memorandum of Understanding or (MoU) with the Calgary Police Service that gives transit peace officers extended authority to arrest and detain individuals with outstanding warrants and execute these warrants. This extended authority also allows for transport of arrested individuals to the Calgary Court Services Section (CSS) or Calgary Remand Center (CRC).

== Future plans ==
=== Commuter rail ===
Calgary Transit briefly experimented with a commuter train in 1996. The service consisted of a single line, running from a platform at 162 Avenue SW (present-day Somerset–Bridlewood station) to Anderson station (then the terminus of the South Line), where commuters could transfer to the CTrain network. Running every 20 minutes during the morning and evening rush hours, the free service carried an average of just over 800 people per day. The city did not lay any new track, but ran the trains on the CPR freight line running alongside the South Line's tracks. Siemens RegioSprinter diesel multiple units were used as the rolling stock. With a top speed of 120 kilometres per hour, the train could cover the roughly 7 kilometres in a matter of minutes. The city ultimately decided not to implement permanent commuter rail. The CTrain system was later extended along the same corridor, with more stations and regular service.

Since at least 2008, transit planners and some politicians have discussed adding commuter service to Airdrie (currently served by express bus routes by Airdrie Transit), Cochrane and Okotoks (currently served by the On-It commuter line), Strathmore (none, only on-demand mobility van service by Handi-Bus) and other nearby cities and towns, but no firm plans have been made.
