= MAX (Calgary) =

Bus rapid transit network in Calgary, Alberta, Canada

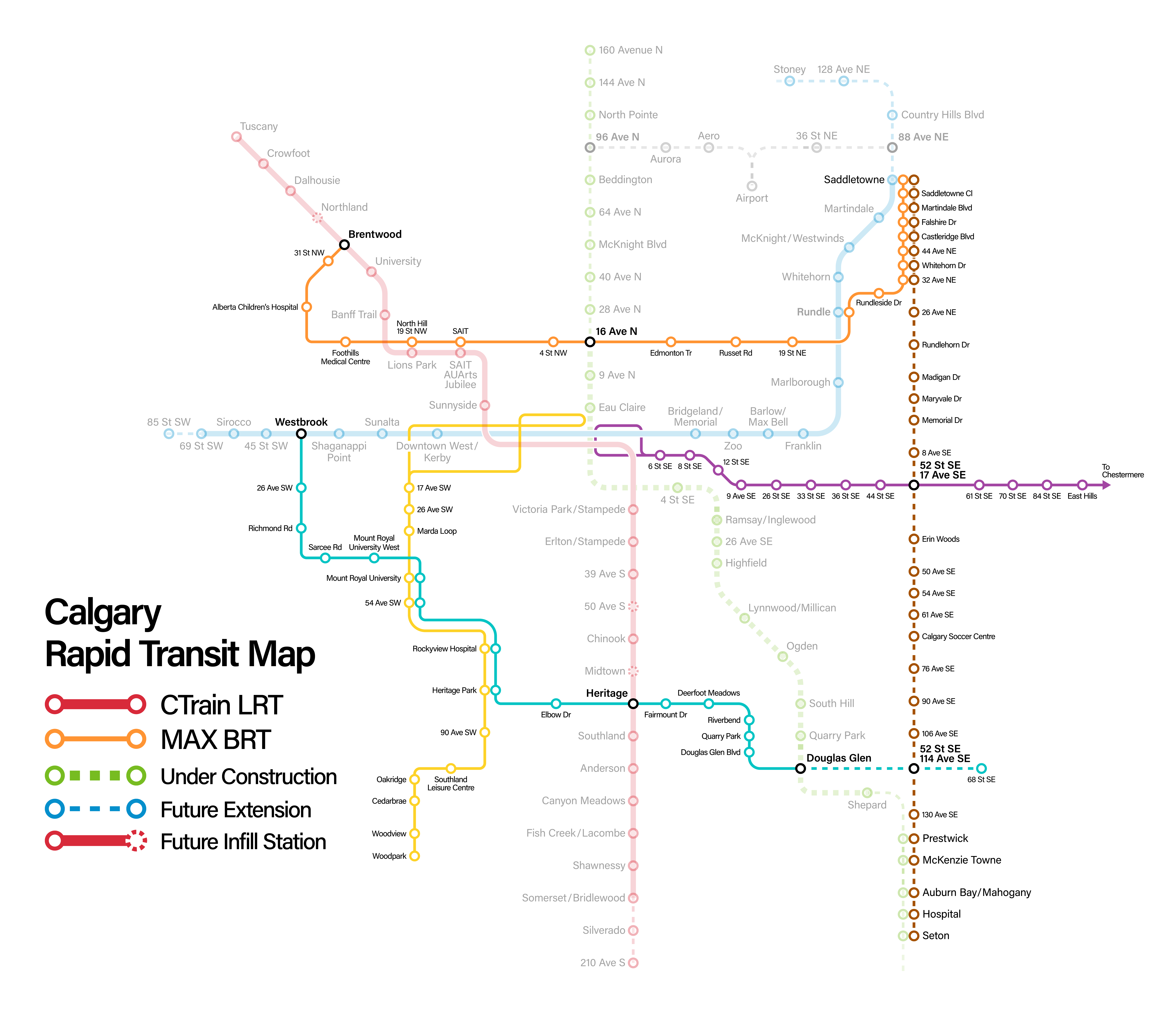
- MAX BRT Network
- Parent: Calgary Transit
- Founded: November 19, 2018
- Locale: Calgary, Alberta
- Service type: Bus rapid transit
- Routes: 4
- Stations: 63
- Operator: Calgary Transit
- Website: Official Website

MAX is a bus rapid transit network operated by Calgary Transit in Calgary, Alberta, Canada. MAX forms a part of Calgary Transit's rapid transit network, along with the CTrain light rail system.

The MAX system opened in November 2018 with three routes: MAX Orange, MAX Teal, and MAX Purple. The MAX Yellow line opened in December 2019. MAX routes are distinguished from Calgary's existing express bus network, branded as "BRT", by the use of dedicated transitway on three lines, heated shelters, real-time information, and elevated sidewalks.

== Routes ==
Line	Opening date	Terminus		Stations	Connecting rapid transit
MAX Orange	November 19, 2018	Brentwood	Saddletowne	21	Red Line; Blue Line; MAX Green
MAX Yellow	December 23, 2019	Woodpark	City Centre	14	Red Line; Blue Line; MAX Teal; MAX Purple; MAX Green
MAX Teal	December 10, 2012 (as Route 306); November 19, 2018 (as MAX Teal)	Westbrook	Douglas Glen	17	Red Line; Blue Line; MAX Yellow
MAX Purple	November 19, 2018	City Centre	East Hills	11	Red Line; Blue Line; MAX Yellow
MAX Green	August 30, 2004 (as Route 301); September 1, 2025 (as MAX Green)	North Pointe Terminal	City Centre	17	Red Line; Blue Line; MAX Yellow; MAX Orange

=== BRT routes ===
In addition to the MAX network, Calgary Transit operates three separate routes branded as "BRT". They are not considered to be part of Calgary's rapid transit network, and do not use dedicated transitway, heated shelter, real-time information, or elevated sidewalks.

Line	Opening date	Terminus		Connecting rapid transit
302 BRT Southeast	August 3, 2009	City Centre	South Health Campus	Red Line; Blue Line; MAX Yellow; MAX Teal; MAX Purple
500 Airport Express	July 27, 2011	City Centre	Airport	Red Line; Blue Line; MAX Orange; MAX Yellow; MAX Purple; MAX Green
503 Symons Valley Express	August 31, 2026	City Centre	Sage Hill Terminal	Red Line; Blue Line; MAX Orange; MAX Yellow; MAX Purple; MAX Green

== History ==
On August 30, 2004, Calgary Transit opened a bus rapid transit line to operate future CTrain routes (the D-Line and an as-yet unplanned northbound line), using conventional buses until articulated buses entered service on June 25, 2007. The BRT system consisted of a single route, Route 301, serving the northern and western parts of the city. A subsequent route, Route 305, was added in 2008, serving the Bowness and 17th Avenue East corridors. A third route, Route 302, entered service on August 31, 2009, along a proposed southeast LRT corridor.

The BRT is considered to be the successor to the Blue Arrow service introduced to the 1970s: both were a series of limited-stop routes that were to be intended to be replaced by LRT service in the future — however, the Blue Arrow service was never a true BRT (limited stop service, stopping at designated blue bus stop signs, was its only distinctive feature), the modern BRT includes priority at traffic signals, enhanced passenger waiting areas and offers a shorter travel time to the downtown with greater capacity articulated buses. The Blue Arrow name all but disappeared in 2000 in order to unify all bus stops under one common scheme, but certain Blue Arrow routes are still in service to this day. In fact, Route 305 replaces a Blue Arrow route (Route 105).

On September 28, 2009, Council approved the Calgary Transportation Plan (CTP), fulfilling Council's priorities of "a city that moves." The CTP identified over 20 corridors that would serve as the city's future Primary Transit Network. These corridors laid the foundations of Calgary Transit's future BRT network. Preliminary functional studies were undertaken – specifically for 17 Avenue SE (2010) and the Southwest Transitway (2011) – to explore the feasibility of major transit projects for the near future. On January 11, 2011, Council approved the Bus Rapid Transit Network Plan, which outlined 11 BRT projects that the City plans to pursue in the short, medium, and long terms respectively.

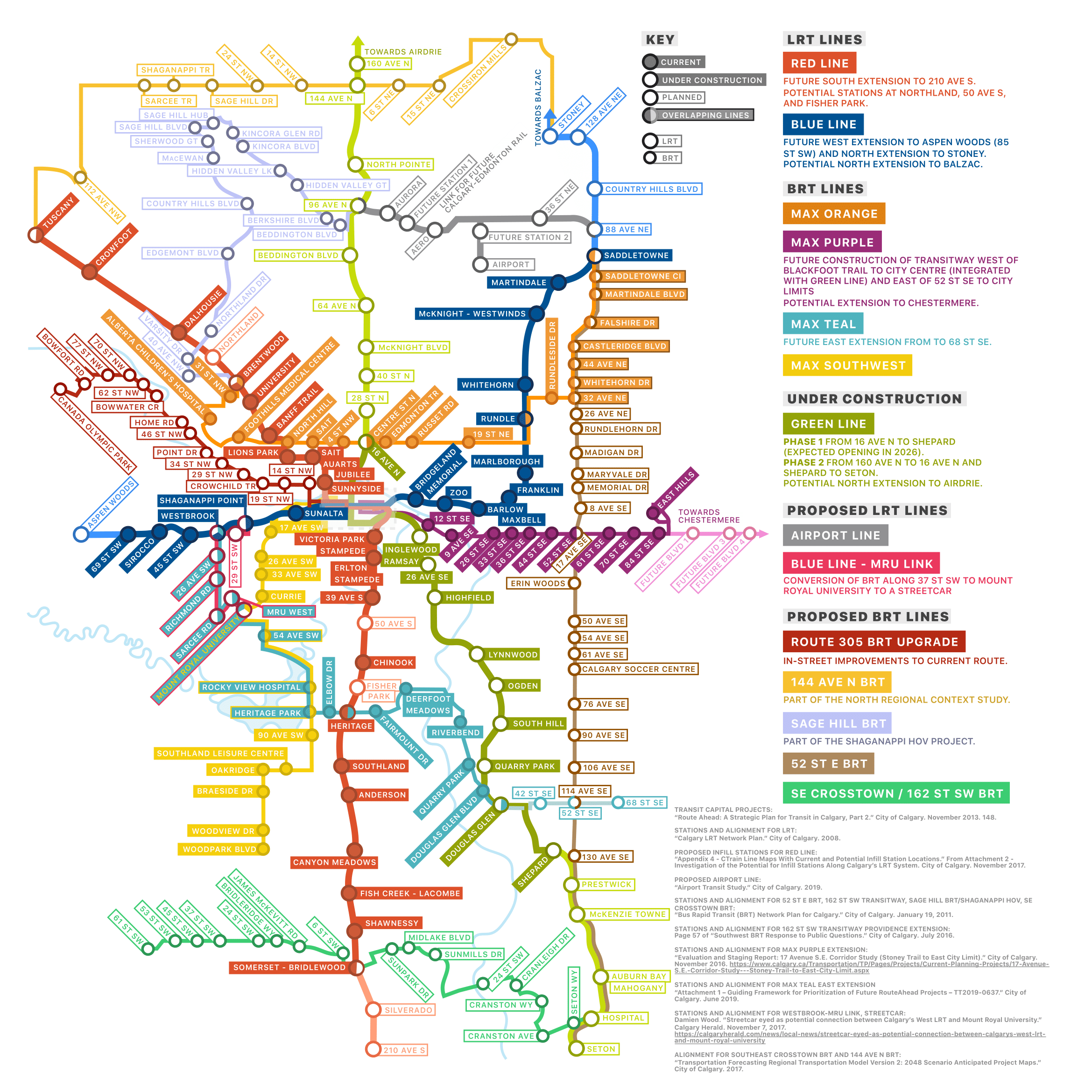
Proposed, planned, and under construction transit projects for the future Calgary rapid transit network. Map based on LRT Network Plan (2008), BRT Network Plan (2011), Route Ahead Plan (2013), and other City documents.

These plans included the introduction of 9 new BRT routes: the Airport BRT (short-long term), which would connect the Downtown Core with Calgary International Airport; the Southwest Transitway BRT (short-medium term), which would connect the Downtown Core with Mount Royal University (MRU) and Woodbine; the Southwest Crosstown BRT (short-medium term), which would connect Westbrook Station with MRU and Quarry Park; the North Crosstown BRT (medium term), which would connect Saddletowne Station with 16 Avenue N and the University of Calgary; the 17 Avenue SE Transitway BRT (medium-long term), which would connect the Downtown Core, Inglewood, 17 Avenue SE, towards the East City Limits; the 52 Street E BRT (medium term), which would connect Saddletowne and South Health Campus through the Southeast Industrial Area; the Sage Hill BRT (long term), which would connect Brentwood Station with the Sage Hill Transit Hub using the Shaganappi HOV; the 162 Avenue S BRT (long term), which would connect Somerset-Bridlewood Station with Providence; and the Southeast Crosstown BRT (long term), which would connect Somerset-Bridlewood Station with South Health Campus through Marquis of Lorne Trail. The plans also included enhancements of existing routes 301, 302, and 305.

The Airport BRT was actualised on July 27, 2011, with Route 300. This line was introduced after Calgary's Mayor promised to make the airport more accessible via public transit. On March 12, 2012, BRT service was cut significantly in Calgary. The 302 now runs with shuttle buses during off peak hours and weekends. The 305 does not run on weekends at all. These are both due to low ridership. The Southwest Crosstown BRT was actualised on December 10, 2012, with the Route 306. This route runs from Westbrook Station to Heritage Station, connecting MRU and Rockyview Hospital.

In December 2012, Council approved the RouteAhead Plan, which outlined the major transit projects the city would pursue for the next 30 years. RouteAhead identified the BRT routes Southwest Transitway, North Crosstown, Southwest Crosstown, 17 Avenue SE, 52 Street E, and Sage Hill (called Shaganappi HOV) as the key priorities for the city.

Plans not included in RouteAhead – like the 162 Avenue S BRT and the conversions of Route 300 and the 17 Avenue SE BRT into a LRT – were identified as projects to be conducted beyond the 30-year RouteAhead timeframe. RouteAhead also foreshadowed the plan of a new BRT route: the North Regional Context Study/144 Avenue N BRT (long term), which would connect Tuscany Station with the planned Stoney Station (Blue Line northeast extension), passing through communities north of 144 Avenue North and CrossIron Mills.

On November 19, 2018, Calgary's BRT network received an overhaul, and saw the introduction of three new lines. The new lines were incorporated under the MAX branding: MAX Orange (Route 303), connecting Brentwood Station with Saddletowne Station, passing through 16th Avenue N; MAX Teal (Route 306), connecting Westbrook Station with the Douglas Glen Transit Hub, passing through MRU, Rockyview Hospital, Heritage Station, and Deerfoot Meadows; and MAX Purple (Route 307), connecting the Downtown Core with East Hills, along a dedicated transitway along International Avenue (Deerfoot Trail to 52 Street SE). The former route 306 was reincorporated under MAX, and busses are now labelled as "MAX Teal." In order to make the new service unique from existing "BRT" routes, new stops now have heated shelters, real-time information, elevated sidewalks, and security cameras (for MAX Purple). MAX Purple is the first service in Calgary to run on a dedicated transitway. In November 2019, the Southwest MAX line, renamed MAX Yellow, opened to the public. It is the second bus service in Calgary to operate in a dedicated transitway. This route runs from the Downtown Core to Woodbine, passing through MRU and 14 Street SW. As the Currie Barracks area of Calgary develops, the route will eventually be re-routed to serve that area. When a bus equipped with a Luminator Spectrum colour display operates a MAX route, the corresponding colour is displayed alongside the route name.

On September 4, 2023, Calgary Transit eliminated route 305.

== Fares ==
MAX services use the same fare structure as the rest of the Calgary Transit system. As of January 2026, a single adult fare is $4, or $2.65 for youth. Day, monthly, low-income, and university passes are also available.

== Transitways ==
=== Southwest Transitway ===
The Southwest Transitway is a bus-only corridor along 14 Street SW, between 75 Avenue SW and Southland Drive. It has three stations along its length, used by MAX Yellow. MAX Teal also uses a portion of the Transitway. Both routes operate in mixed traffic and shoulder lanes for the rest of their routing.

=== 17 Avenue SE Transitway ===
The 17 Avenue SE Transitway is a bus-only corridor along 17 Avenue SE, between 9 Avenue SE and Hubalta Road SE It has six stations along its length, used by MAX Purple.

== See also ==
- Calgary Transit
- CTrain
