= 14 Street W (Calgary) =

Street in Calgary, Alberta, Canada

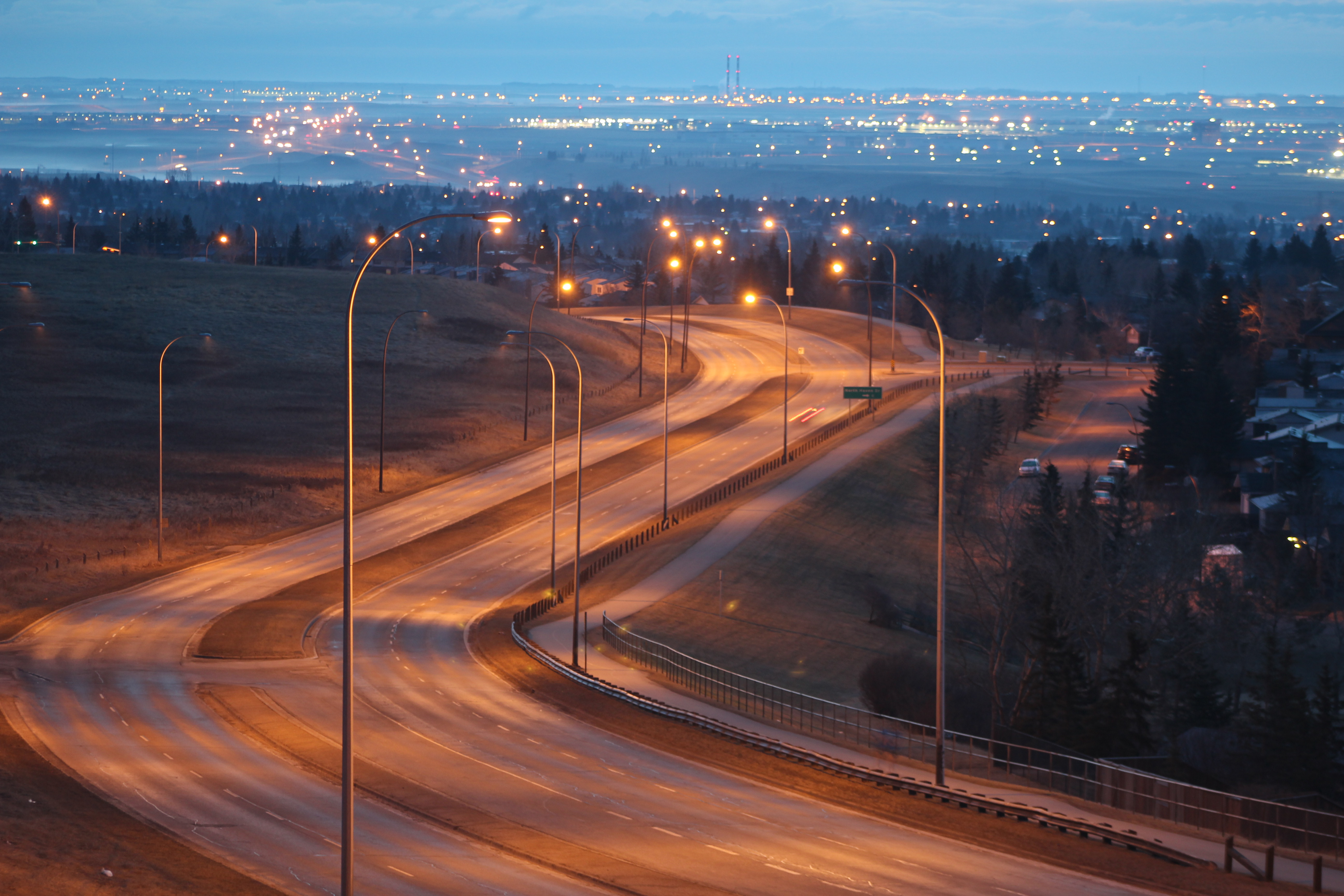
- 14 St NW along Nose Hill Park (2013).
- Location: Calgary, Alberta
- ---- Southern section
- 14 Street SW
- Length: 6.0 km (3.7 mi)
- South end: Canyon Meadows Drive
- Major junctions: Anderson Road; Southland Drive
- North end: Glenmore Trail
- ---- Central section
- 14 Street SW, 14 Street NW
- Length: 15.0 km (9.3 mi)
- South end: 38 Avenue SW
- Major junctions: 17 Avenue SW; 9 Avenue SW / Bow Trail; 16 Avenue NW (Highway 1); John Laurie Boulevard; Country Hills Boulevard
- North end: Hidden Valley Drive
- ---- Northern section
- 14 Street NW
- Length: 4.5 km (2.8 mi)
- South end: Panatella Boulevard
- Major junctions: Stoney Trail (Highway 201)
- North end: Hwy 566 (Calgary city limits)

Neighborhoods
- Southern section: Canyon Meadows; Woodlands; Southwood; Braeside; Pump Hill; Haysboro; Chinook Park; Central section: Altadore; Elbow Park; South Calgary; Mount Royal; Bankview; Beltline; Sunalta; Downtown West End; Hillhurst; Capitol Hill; Collingwood; Cambrian Heights; North Haven; Thorncliffe; Huntington Hills; Beddington Heights; MacEwan Glen; Sandstone Valley; Hidden Valley; Northern section: Panorama Hills; Evanston; Keystone Hills (future)

14 Street W is the name of two major arterial roads and a short collector road in Calgary, Alberta, separated by the Elbow River and the West Nose Creek valley. Originally proposed as a continuous route and north-south freeway, the plans were cancelled in favour of 24 Street W, which became Crowchild Trail.

== Route description ==
=== Southern segment ===
The south segment begins at Canyon Meadows Drive and is an expressway between Anderson Road and Glenmore Trail, passing by Heritage Park Historical Village and Rockyview General Hospital. Prior to the completion of Tssut'ina Trail, 14 Street SW was part of a bypass route which connected Highway 1 west and Highway 2 south.

The City of Calgary opened a 3-kilometre (2 mi) long dedicated bus-only transitway on December 23, 2019 as part of the city's MAX BRT network. The transitway, which carries MAX Yellow and MAX Teal, begins just west of 14 Street SW at the intersection of 75 Avenue SW and Eagle Ridge Drive near Rockyview General Hospital, and travels parallel to 14 Street SW, ending at the intersection of Southland Drive and Bradbury Drive.

=== Central segment ===
The central portion of 14 Street W travels between the communities of Altadore and Elbow Park in the south and Hidden Valley in the north, passing through Calgary's inner city west of downtown. A short segment intersects 50 Avenue SW at the south end of River Park, providing access to the Emily Follensbee School. The arterial road starts at the north end of the park, at the intersection of 38 Avenue SW as 14 Street SW and travels north where it crosses the Bow River on the Mewata Bridge and becomes 14 Street NW. It continues north past SAIT and North Hill Centre, crossing 16 Avenue NW (Highway 1) and John Laurie Boulevard. It continues along the eastern edge of Nose Hill Park, ending in the community of Hidden Valley north of Country Hills Boulevard.

14 Street W used to be part of Highway 1A between 9 Avenue SW and 16 Avenue NW, but the designation was dropped in the 1970s.

=== Northern segment ===
The extreme northern portion of 14 Street NW connects the communities of Panorama Hills and Evanston. The northern segment is split by Stoney Trail, where ramps allow for right-in/right-out access; however grading is in place for a future partial-cloverleaf interchange. North of Symons Valley Parkway, 14 Street NW becomes a rural road and ends at the Calgary city limits at the Highway 566 intersection; continuing as Range Road 14 in Rocky View County. The roadway will be expanded to a four lane, arterial road as the future community of Keystone Hills, located to the east, is developed.

== Major intersections ==
From south to north. The entire route is in Calgary.

km	mi	Destinations	Notes
0.0	0.0	Canyon Meadows Drive	Roadway turns east.
1.1	0.68	Anderson Road	
2.4	1.5	Southland Drive	South end of Southwest Transitway
3.6	2.2	90 Avenue SW	90 Avenue SW station
4.4	2.7	Heritage Drive	Heritage Park station; access to Heritage Park Historical Village
5.3	3.3	75 Avenue SW	Rockyview station; north end of Southwest Transitway; no westbound to southbound access; access to Rockyview General Hospital
6.0	3.7	Glenmore Trail	Semi-directional T interchange
2.9 km (1.8 mi) gap in 14 Street SW
8.9	5.5	38 Avenue SW	
9.4	5.8	33 Avenue SW / Council Way	
10.9	6.8	17 Avenue SW	
11.4	7.1	12 Avenue SW	One-way; eastbound
11.6	7.2	11 Avenue SW	One-way; westbound
11.6	7.2	10 Avenue SW	Access to Sunalta station
11.7– 11.9	7.3– 7.4	9 Avenue SW east / Bow Trail west – City Centre	Interchange; exit to 9 Ave SW, entrance from Bow Trail (6 Ave SW) only
11.9– 12.2	7.4– 7.6	Mewata Bridge crosses the Bow River	
12.2	7.6	Memorial Drive	Interchange; northbound to westbound exit, eastbound to southbound entrance
12.5	7.8	Kensington Road	
13.8	8.6	14 Avenue NW	Diamond interchange; access to SAIT/ACAD/Jubilee station, SAIT, Alberta University of the Arts, Jubilee Auditorium
14.1	8.8	16 Avenue NW (Highway 1)	Diamond interchange
15.9	9.9	Northmount Drive	
16.6	10.3	John Laurie Boulevard	Single-point urban interchange; traffic signals
19.1	11.9	64 Avenue NW	Access to Nose Hill Park
23.5	14.6	Country Hills Boulevard	
23.9	14.9	Hidden Valley Drive	
2.7 km (1.7 mi) gap in 14 Street NW
26.6	16.5	Panatella Boulevard	
27.2	16.9	Stoney Trail (Highway 201)	Partial cloverleaf interchange; Hwy 201 exit 52
27.7	17.2	Symons Valley Parkway	
31.1	19.3	Highway 566 (176 Avenue NW)	Calgary city limits; continues north as Range Road 14
1.000 mi = 1.609 km; 1.000 km = 0.621 mi: Closed/former; Incomplete access

== See also ==
- Transportation in Calgary
