= Brentwood station =

Brentwood station may refer to:

- Brentwood railway station in Brentwood, Essex, England
- Brentwood station (Calgary), a CTrain station in Calgary, Alberta, Canada
- Brentwood station (LIRR), a Long Island Rail Road station in Brentwood, New York, United States
- Brentwood Town Centre station, a SkyTrain rapid transit station in Burnaby, British Columbia
