= MAX Green (Calgary) =

Bus route in Calgary, Canada

Overview
- System: MAX
- Operator: Calgary Transit
- Began service: September 1, 2025

Route
- Start: North Pointe
- End: City Centre
- Stops: 15

MAX Green, also known as Route 301, is a bus rapid transit line in Calgary, Alberta. Part of Calgary Transit's MAX network, it largely travels north–south along Centre Street, and Harvest Hills Boulevard. It connects CTrain stations in downtown Calgary to communities north, using new bus stations and transit-only bus lanes on the existing route 301.

== Stations and route ==
MAX Green begins in the northeast community of Country Hills at North Pointe Terminal. It travels south on Harvest Hills Boulevard, on an alignment consistent with the planned northern expansion of the Green Line LRT. This rapid bus line has transfers available to MAX Orange at 16 Avenue N, and connects to the Red Line, Blue Line, and MAX Yellow at the Downtown Calgary stops.

Key
†	Terminus

Station	Route transfers
North Pointe†	8, 86, 89, 100, 114, 115, 124, 137, 157, 421
Country Hills Boulevard	89
Harvest Oak Gate NE	86
96 Ave N	86, 114, 500, 503
Beddington Towne Centre	2, 46, 47, 86, 114, 500
78 Ave N	2, 3, 4, 5, 20, 32, 46, 47, 86, 114, 500, 503
64 Ave N	3, 32, 47, 500, 503
Northmount Dr NW / 56 Ave NE	3, 500, 503
40 Ave NW / 41 Ave NE	3, 38, 500, 503
28 Ave N	3, 500, 503
16 Ave N	MAX Orange, 19
City Centre†	Red Line; Blue Line; MAX Yellow, 1, 2, 3, 4, 5, 6, 7, 10, 13, 15, 17, 22, 24, 90, 101, 302, 307

== See also ==
- MAX
  - MAX Purple
  - MAX Teal
  - MAX Orange
  - MAX Yellow
- Calgary Transit
