= MAX Yellow Line =

MAX Yellow Line may refer to:

- MAX Yellow (Calgary), a bus rapid transit line in Calgary, Alberta, Canada
- MAX Yellow Line (TriMet), a light rail line serving Portland, Oregon, U.S.
