= Cardel =

Cardel may refer to:

- Cardel Homes, a homebuilder in Calgary, Alberta, Canada
- José Cardel, Veracruz, a city in Mexico

== See also ==
- Cardell, a given name
