= MAX Orange Line =

MAX Orange Line may refer to:

- MAX Orange (Calgary), a bus rapid transit line in Calgary, Alberta, Canada.
- MAX Orange Line (TriMet), a light rail line serving the Portland metropolitan area in Oregon, U.S.
