= University station (Calgary) =

Light rail station in Calgary, Alberta, Canada

University
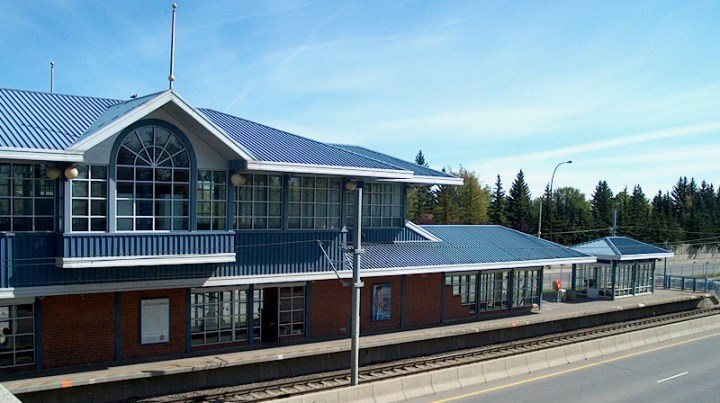

General information
- Location: 3101 Crowchild Trail NW
- Coordinates: 51°04′49″N 114°07′23″W
- Owner: Calgary Transit
- Platforms: Centre loading platform
- Connections: 9 Dalhousie/Chinook; 20 Heritage/Northmount

Construction
- Structure type: At-grade
- Parking: None
- Accessible: yes

History
- Opened: 1987; 39 years ago
- Rebuilt: 2013; 13 years ago

Services
Preceding station	Calgary Transit	Following station
Brentwood toward Tuscany	Red Line	Banff Trail toward Somerset–Bridlewood
Location

University station is a CTrain light rail station on the Northwest Line (Route 201) in Calgary, Alberta, Canada, that opened on September 7, 1987. The station served as the original line's terminus station until August 30, 1990. The station is located in the median of Crowchild Trail, just north of 24 Avenue NW and east of the University of Calgary grounds.

== Facilities ==
The station is connected by bridges to both sides of Crowchild Trail, and two sets of stairs and an elevator provide access to the platform. In addition to the University of Calgary, the station is another LRT station adjacent to Banff Trail. One of the busiest stations on the line, experiencing a high volume of traffic from students at the University of Calgary, and nearby William Aberhart High School.

As part of Calgary Transit's plan to operate 4-car CTrains by the end of 2014, all 3-car platforms were to be extended. Construction on the platform extension at University Station was completed in December 2013.

In 2007, the station registered an average of 16,100 boardings per weekday.

== Buses ==
The following routes have a connection at University Station:

- 9 - Dalhousie/Chinook
- 20 - Heritage/Northmount Dr N

University Station does not have a bus terminal.
