= MAX Yellow (Calgary) =

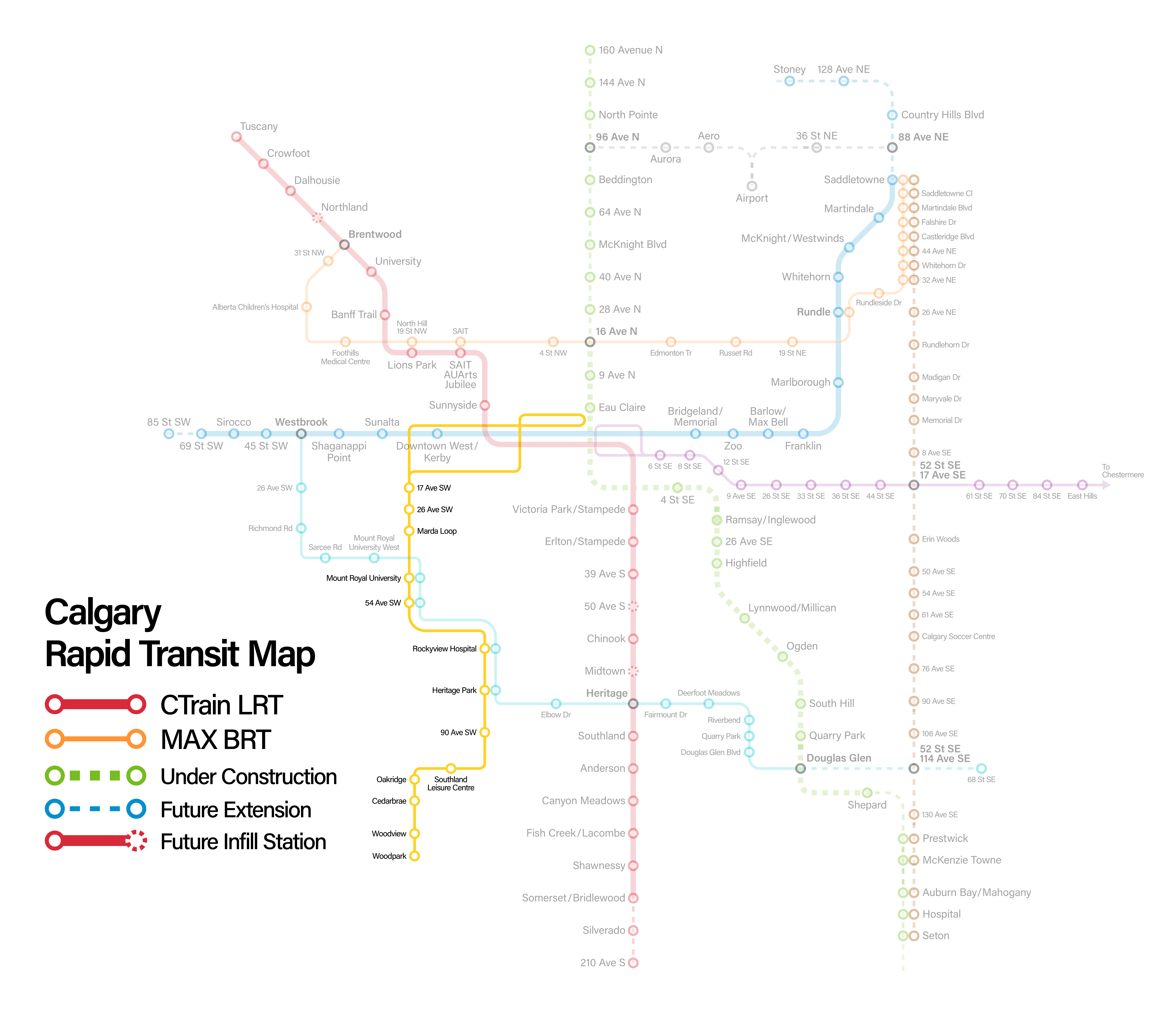
- MAX Yellow route

Overview
- System: MAX
- Operator: Calgary Transit
- Began service: December 23, 2019

Route
- Start: Woodpark
- End: City Centre
- Length: 11.6 miles (18.7 km)
- Stops: 14

MAX Yellow, also known as Route 304 or the Southwest BRT, is a bus rapid transit line in Calgary, Alberta. Part of Calgary Transit's MAX network, it largely travels north-south along Crowchild Trail SW, 14 Street SW, and 24 Street SW. It connects CTrain stations in downtown Calgary to the southwest quadrant.

== Stations and route ==
MAX Yellow begins in the southwest at Woodpark Boulevard. It travels northeast to the Southwest Transitway where it meets MAX Teal. After stopping at Mount Royal University, it travels north along Crowchild Trail to Bow Trail. MAX Yellow terminates in Downtown Calgary, connecting to the Red Line, Blue Line, and MAX Purple.

Key
†	Terminus

Station	Opened	Route transfers
Woodpark†	2019	—
Woodview	2019	56
Braeside/Cedarbrae	2019	56, 126
Oakridge	2019	56, 126
Southland Leisure Centre	2019	99, 125, 126
90 Ave SW	2019	56
Heritage Park	2018	MAX Teal, 20
Rockyview Hospital	2018	, 20
54 Ave SW	2018	, 7, 9, 20
Mount Royal University	2018	, 9, 13, 20
Marda Loop	2019	20, 66
26 Ave SW	2019	6, 20, 66
17 Ave SW	2019	2, 20, 66
City Centre†	2019	Red Line; Blue Line; MAX Purple; MAX Green

== See also ==
- MAX Orange
- MAX Teal
- MAX Purple
- MAX
- Calgary Transit
