= Cardel Homes =

Cardel Homes is a homebuilder based in Calgary, Alberta, Canada. Cardel was founded in 1973 and has additional operations in Ontario, Florida and Colorado.

== Brands ==
Several brands exist under the Cardel parent brand. Cardel's homebuilding divisions include Cardel Lifestyles, which specialises in multi-family homes, and Cardel Resorts, which builds resort properties in the Columbia Valley, in addition to the company's single-family homes division.

Cardel also operates a mortgage services division called Cardel Financial as well as a design division, Cardel Designs, which is based out of an 11,000 sq ft (1,000 m^{2}) design centre in the head office, located in Quarry Park, southeast Calgary. The Cardel head office is also home to a design kitchen that regularly hosts dinners for customers.

Additional design centres are located in Cardel's Ottawa, Denver and Tampa regional offices.
