= Cardell =

Cardell is both a given name and a surname. Notable people with the name include:

- Cardell Butler, AKA "Ballaholic", American streetball player
- Cardell Camper (born 1952), former Major League Baseball pitcher who played for one season
- Cardis Cardell Willis (1937–2007), influential Milwaukee comic
- Charles Cardell (1892–1977), English witch who had an influence on the modern neopagan religion of Wicca
- Christian Cardell Corbet (born 1976), Canadian painter, sculptor and designer

A cardell was a type of cot bed used in southern Africa in the nineteenth century.

== See also ==
- Florence Cardell-Oliver (1876–1965), Western Australian politician and political activist
- Cardel (disambiguation)
