= MAX Teal =

Canadian bus line

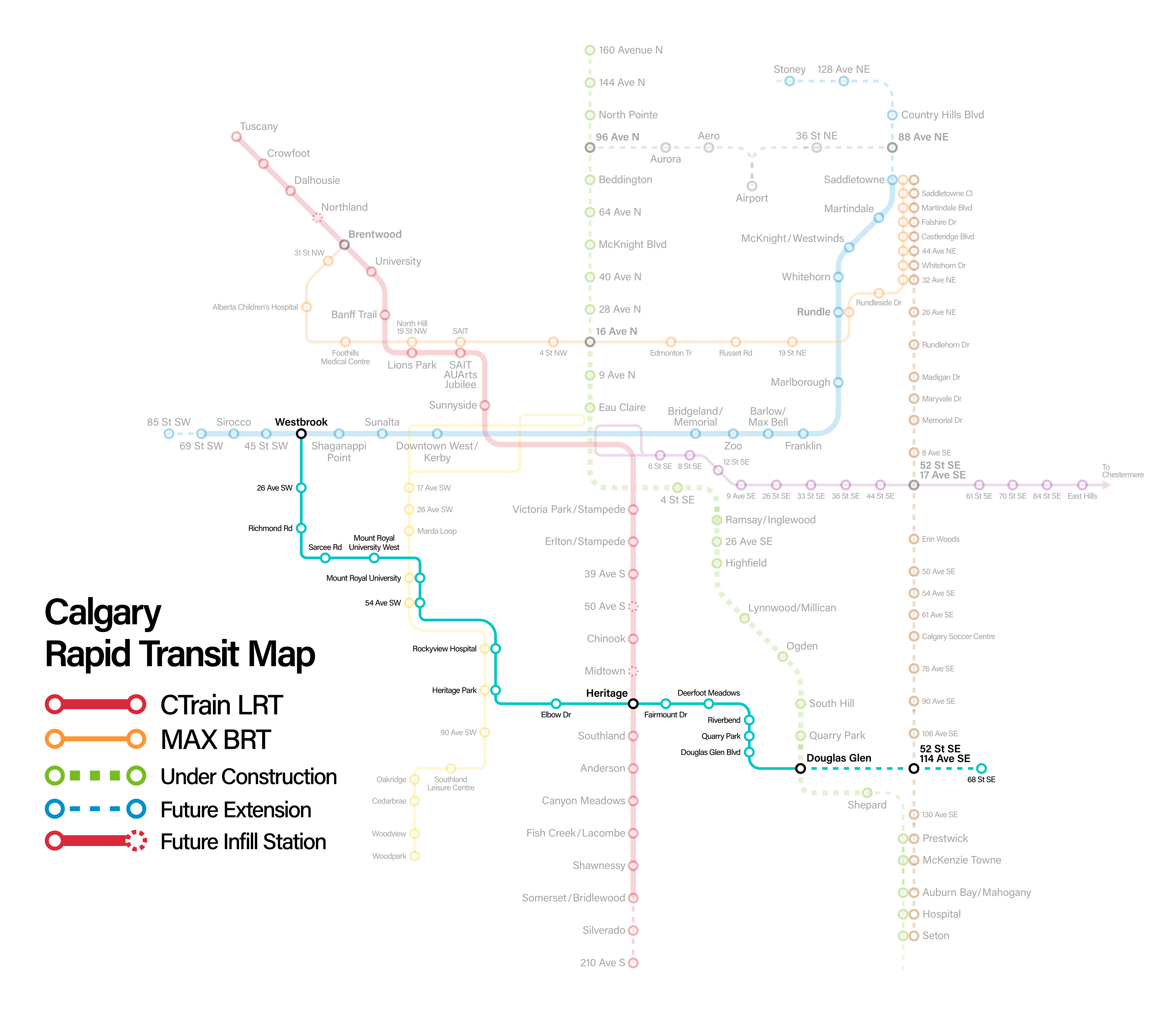
- MAX Teal route

Overview
- System: MAX
- Operator: Calgary Transit
- Began service: December 10, 2012 (as Route 306); November 19, 2018 (as MAX Teal)

Route
- Start: Westbrook
- End: Douglas Glen
- Length: 13.7 miles (22.0 km)
- Stops: 17

MAX Teal, also known as Route 306 and the South Crosstown BRT, is a bus rapid transit line in Calgary, Alberta. Part of Calgary Transit's MAX network, it connects CTrain stations on the Red and Blue lines to the southwest and southeast quadrants of Calgary.

== Stations and route ==
MAX Teal begins in the southwest at Westbrook station on the Blue Line, travelling southeast, partially along the Southwest Transitway where it meets MAX Yellow. MAX Teal stops at Heritage station on the Red Line, before continuing southeast to terminate at Douglas Glen station, the terminus of the future Green Line.

Key
| † | Terminus |

| Station | Opened | Route transfers |
|---|---|---|
| Westbrook† | 2012 | Blue Line |
| 26 Av SW | 2018 | — |
| Richmond Rd | 2018 | — |
| Sarcee Rd | 2018 | — |
| MRU West Gate | 2018 | — |
| Mount Royal University | 2018 | MAX Yellow |
| 54 Ave SW | 2018 | MAX Yellow (Calgary) |
| Rockyview Hospital | 2018 | MAX Yellow (Calgary) |
| Heritage Park | 2018 | MAX Yellow (Calgary) |
| Elbow Dr | 2018 | — |
| Heritage | 1981 | Red Line |
| Fairmount Dr | 2018 | — |
| Deerfoot Meadows | 2018 | — |
| Riverbend | 2018 | — |
| Quarry Park | 2018 | — |
| Douglas Glen Blvd | 2018 | — |
| Douglas Glen† | 2018 | — |

== See also ==
- MAX Orange
- MAX Yellow
- MAX Purple
- MAX
- Calgary Transit
