= MAX Purple =

Bus route in Calgary, Alberta, Canada

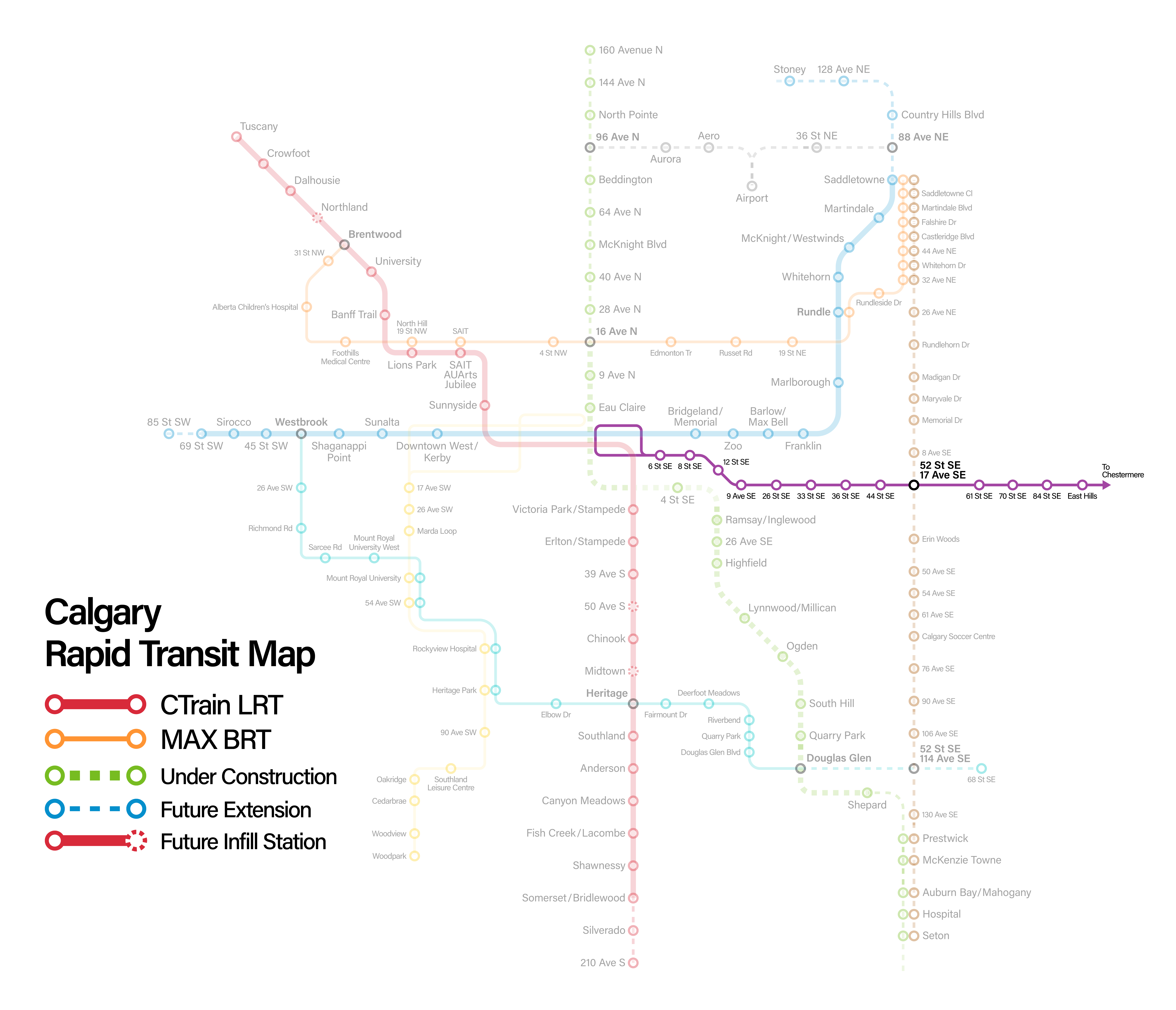
- MAX Purple route

Overview
- System: MAX
- Operator: Calgary Transit
- Began service: November 19, 2018

Route
- Start: City Centre
- End: East Hills/Chestermere
- Length: 12.8 miles (20.6 km)
- Stops: 11

MAX Purple, also known as Route 307 or the 17 Avenue SE BRT, is a bus rapid transit line in Calgary, Alberta. Part of Calgary Transit's MAX network, it largely travels east along 17 Avenue SE (International Avenue) from downtown Calgary.

MAX Purple, along with Route 1, provide service for East Calgary's primary transit corridor, and has become an important transit connector for Greater Forest Lawn residents. During its planning stages, Mayor Naheed Nenshi insisted the new line be made his favourite colour purple, citing his family's personal connection to International Avenue. The line itself operates on the former eastward service of Route 305 and replaces the retired bus route 126 Applewood Express. Future plans for the line include the permanent eastward extension into neighbouring Chestermere via 17 Avenue SE/Chestermere Boulevard, as well as a potential long-term conversion into an LRT line.

== History ==
Since the introduction of the MAX Purple line in 2018, it has been credited as a key driver of International Avenue's urban redevelopment. The MAX Purple has attracted local interest as a project that rectifies an over century-long promise to bring adequate rapid transit to Greater Forest Lawn.

The settlement of the Town of Forest Lawn was first initiated in 1901, when two land promoters promoted the new community with a false rumour of a future streetcar connection east of the Bow River. By 1961, Forest Lawn was annexed by the expanding City of Calgary, yet was not given any assurance of adequate transit to Calgary's growing downtown. Between the 1970s and 1980s, public transit investments for the Greater Forest Lawn area did not keep pace with the area's growing commercial and residential developments, ultimately contributing to the area's urban decay. This was primarily motivated by the City's early plans to convert Forest Lawn's high street 17 Avenue SE into a six-lane thoroughfare at the expense of the neighbourhood's businesses. In the 1990s, neighbourhood advocates established the International Avenue Business Revitalization Zone (BRZ), as a vehicle to bring urban renewal to a largely neglected region of the city.

Early attempts to implement rapid transit for Greater Forest Lawn started in the early 1970s, with the introduction of the Blue Arrow 110 express bus service. This service complimented the already established Route 1 Bowness/Forest Lawn and 126 Applewood Express bus routes which connected Greater Forest Lawn with City Centre. These attempts were advanced by the International Avenue BRZ, who in 1995 submitted two proposals to the City which outlined steps for Forest Lawn's urban revitalization through meaningful transportation planning. Another proposal was submitted in 2003 by the BRZ in collaboration with the University of Calgary Faculty of Environmental Design, which envisioned a multi-modal, retail-based boulevard supported by a light rail transit service. In 2008, Calgary Transit brought bus rapid transit (BRT) to Greater Forest Lawn with the creation of Route 305, which operated along the length of Route 1's crosstown route. Route 305 had various shortcomings, such as its lack of weekend service and its vulnerability to delays due to its mixed traffic operations. In 2009, the City of Calgary approved the Calgary Transportation Plan, which identified the 17 Avenue SE corridor as a candidate for a dedicated bus-only transitway. In 2010, Calgary Transit submitted its transportation plan study, which determined the alignment and design of the future 17 Avenue SE transitway from 8 Street SE to 84 Street SE. This study was approved by the City of Calgary in 2011 as a medium-to-long term priority for the city's future BRT network. In 2015, the City of Calgary allocated $889 million towards the BRT network, of which $96 million went towards the construction of the 17 Avenue transitway.

Construction began in 2017 and was divided into two phases – both of which were constructed simultaneously. Phase 1 focused on the dedicated bus-only transitway on 17 Avenue SE between 28 Street SE and Hubalta Road SE, which included the construction of BRT station platforms and a complete transformation of International Avenue infrastructure. Phase 2 focused on the construction of a transit and pedestrian only bridge crossing Deerfoot Trail, connecting 28 Street SE to 9 Avenue SE. MAX Purple began operations on November 19, 2018 as part of the city's new MAX BRT network.

Future plans for the line include phases 3 and 4. Phase 3 focuses on a bus-only lane along 9 Avenue SE in Inglewood, which will extend into the line's City Centre route. Phase 4 focuses on the extension of the 17 Avenue transitway from Hubalta Road SE to East Hills.

An extension to Chestermere is currently undergoing a pilot program which is being evaluated throughout the term of the agreement between the City of Calgary. The extension includes twelve stops on the west side of Chestermere, with additional stops potentially being added in the future. The city also has plans to convert the line into the LRT going all the way to Chestermere, it plans on doing this when the city reaches a population of 1.6 million which will most likely be around the year 2046.

== Stations and route ==
MAX Purple begins in Downtown Calgary, where it meets the Red Line, Blue Line, MAX Yellow, and MAX Green. It travels along 9 Avenue SE to 17 Avenue SE Avenue (International Avenue) along its own dedicated 17 Avenue Transitway, which it then travels east to its terminus at East Hills. During peak hours is terminus is changed to Chestermere. Between City Centre and 52 Street SE (which includes the 17 Avenue Transitway), Route 1 and MAX Purple provide the same service for East Calgary residents heading towards downtown Calgary. The transitway also features the province's first U-turn signals as a means to address reduced vehicle access to the International Avenue's businesses.

Key
†	Terminus
‡	Chestermere Pilot Program

Station	Opened	Route transfers
City Centre†	2018	Red Line; Blue Line; MAX Yellow; MAX Green
6 St SE	2018	—
12 St SE	2018	—
19 St SE	2018	—
28 St SE	2018	—
33 St SE	2018	—
36 St SE	2018	—
44 St SE	2018	—
52 St SE	2018	—
61 St SE	2018	—
70 St SE	2018	—
East Hills†	2018	—
Chelsea Drive‡	2021	—
Lakeview Drive‡	2021	—
Rainbow Road‡	2021	—
West Creek Drive‡	2021	—
Lavender Way‡	2021	—
West Creek Close‡	2021	—
Merganser Drive‡	2021	—
Mclvor Terrace‡	2021	—
Anniversary Park‡	2021	—
Windermere Drive‡	2021	—
Willowmere Close‡	2021	—
Springmere Drive‡	2021	—
East Hills†	2018	—

== See also ==
- MAX Orange
- MAX Yellow
- MAX Teal
- MAX
- Calgary Transit
