= Woodbine, Calgary =

Woodbine
- Neighbourhood
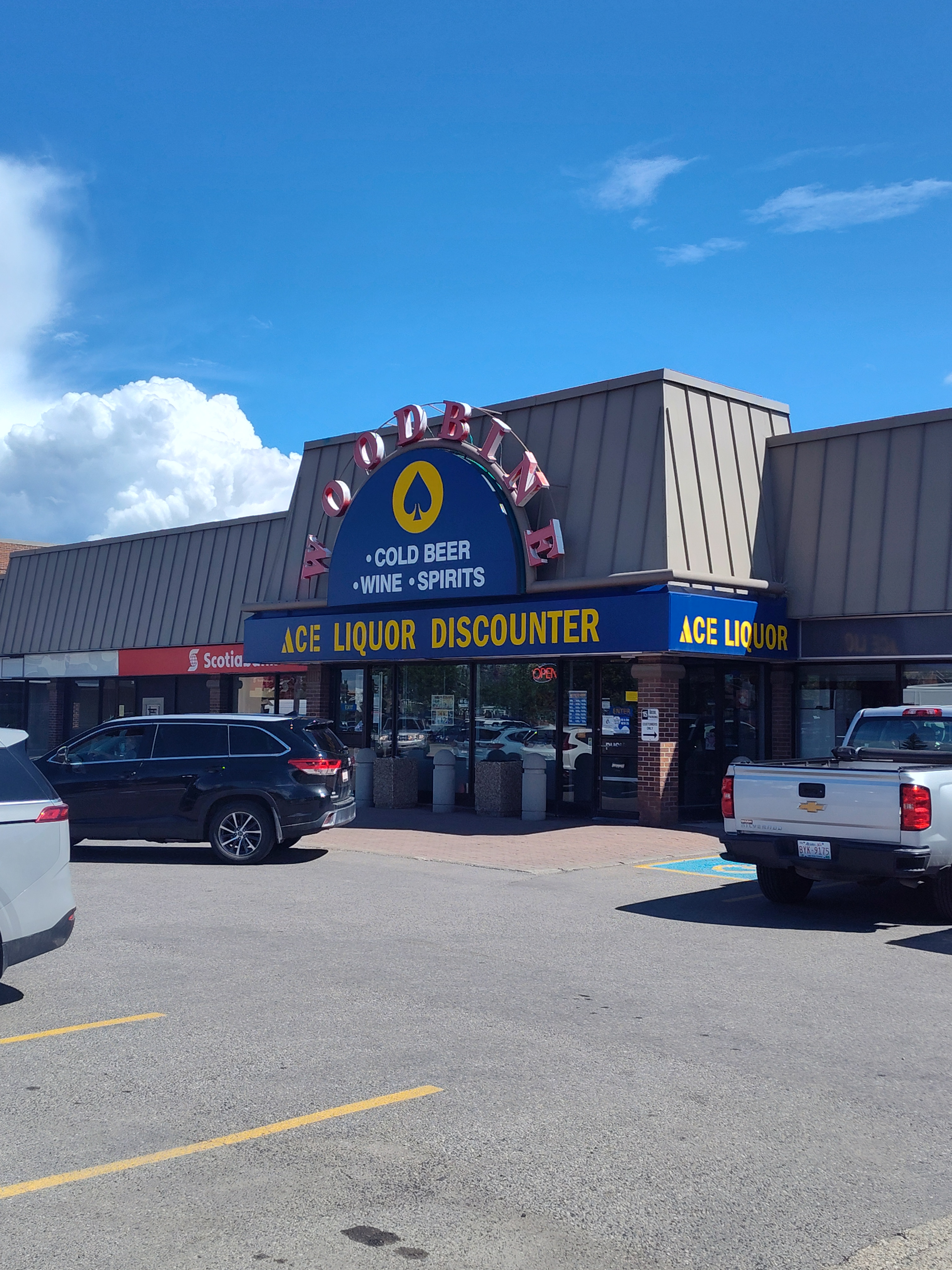
- Woodbine Square shopping mall located inside of Woodbine

- Location of Woodbine in Calgary
- Coordinates: 50°56′34″N 114°07′44″W
- Country: Canada
- Province: Alberta
- City: Calgary
- Quadrant: SW
- Ward: 13
- Established: 1980

Government
  - Mayor: Jeromy Farkas
  - Administrative body: Calgary City Council
  - Councillor: Dan McLean (Communities First)

Area
  - Total: 3.4 km^{2} (1.3 sq mi)
- Elevation: 1,115 m (3,658 ft)

Population (2011)
  - Total: 9,086
- Website: Woodbine Community Association

Woodbine is a residential neighbourhood in the southwest quadrant of Calgary, Alberta. It is located at the western edge of the city, and is bordered on the north by Anderson Road, on the west by Tsuut'ina Trail, on the east by 24th Street West, and to the south by Fish Creek Provincial Park.

Woodbine was established in 1979. It is represented in the Calgary City Council

== Woodbine Square ==
Woodbine Square is an enclosed shopping mall located inside of the Woodbine community. It is a shopping centre with shopping plaza elements, with a small indoor portion. It features 98,022 sq ft (9,106.5 m^{2}) of retail floor area.

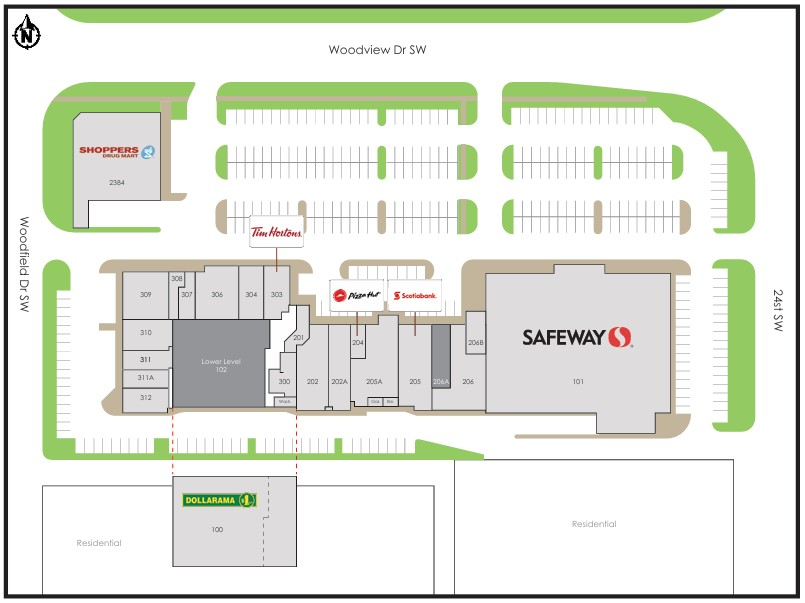
Map and layout of the Woodbine Square shopping mall

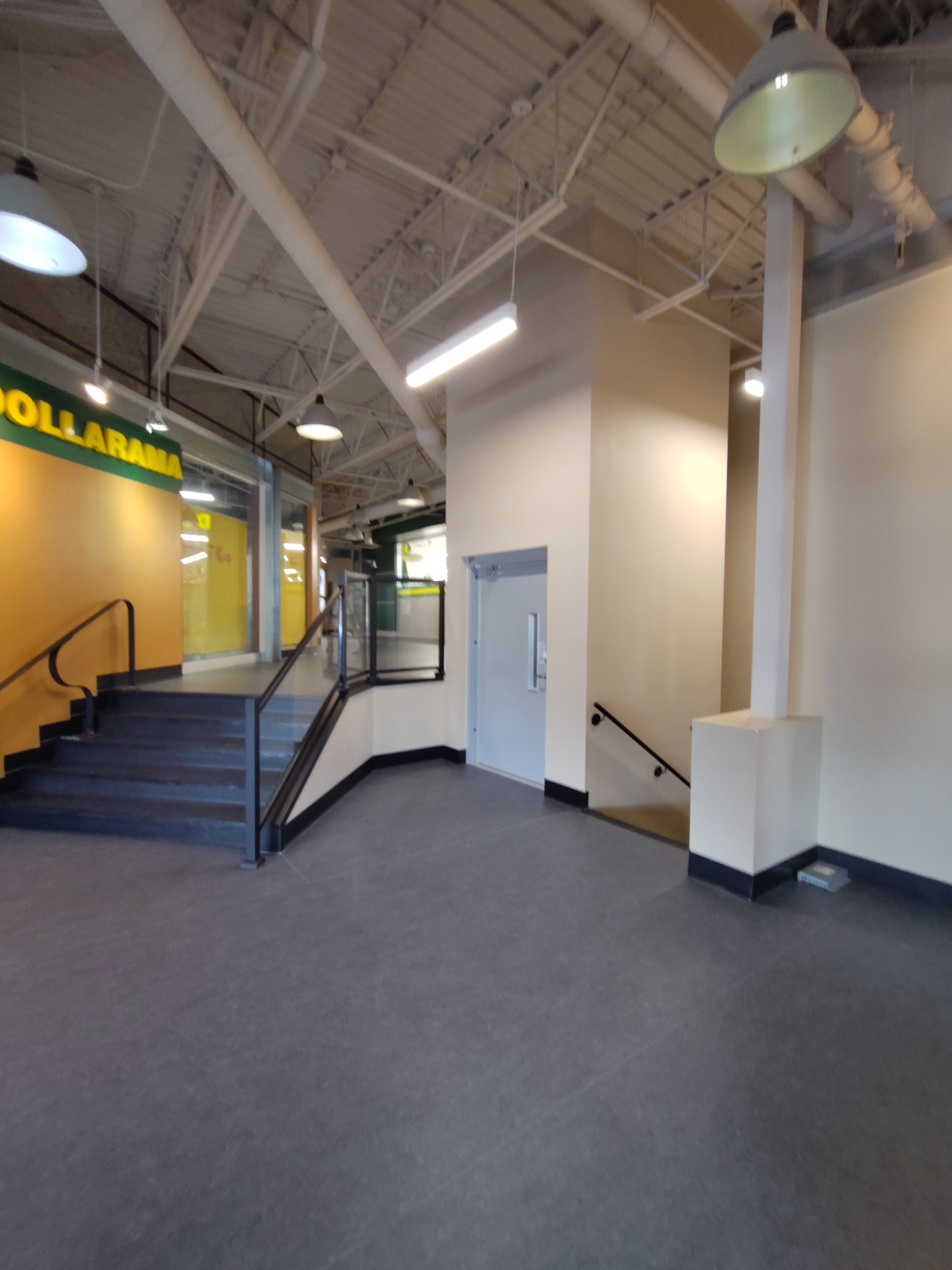
Interior of the Woodbine Square shopping mall

== Transit ==
The MAX Yellow bus rapid transit line passes through the community of Woodbine with 2 BRT stations being located inside the community: Woodview and Woodpark Stations.

Calgary Transit bus route 56 passes through the community.

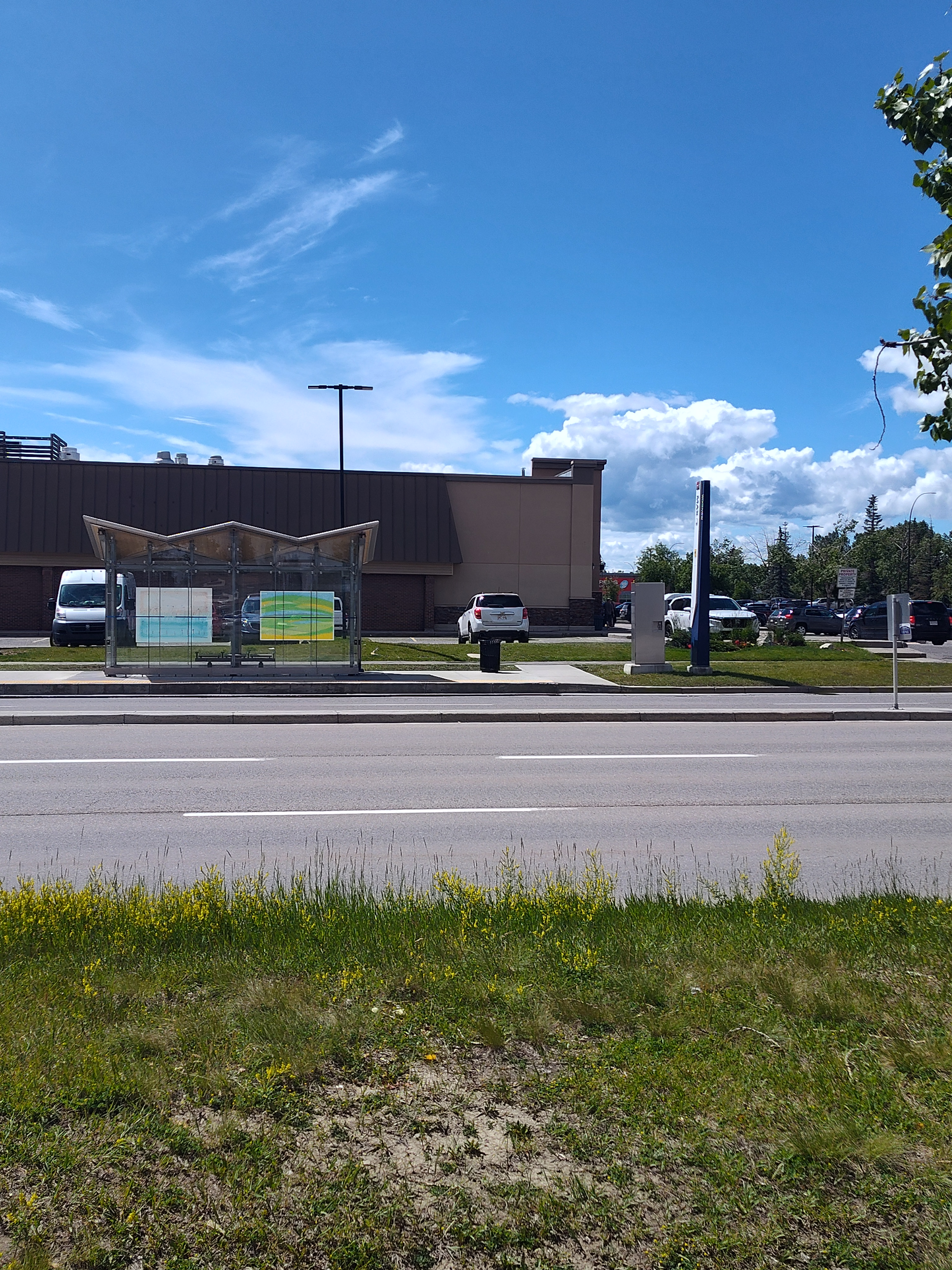
Woodview Station of the MAX Yellow

== Demographics ==
In the City of Calgary's 2012 municipal census, Woodbine had a population of 9,131 living in 3,371 dwellings, a 0.5% increase from its 2011 population of 9,086. With a land area of 3.2 km^{2} (1.2 sq mi), it had a population density of 2,850/km^{2} (7,390/sq mi) in 2012.

Residents in this community had a median household income of $83,844 in 2000, and there were 7.3% low income residents living in the neighbourhood. As of 2000, 21.8% of the residents were immigrants. Most buildings were single-family detached homes, and 9.4% of the housing was used for renting.

Crime statistics in Woodbine are quite favorable compared to the rest of Calgary. In both 2006 and 2007 "Person" crimes were rated by the Calgary Police Service as 3 per 1000 population. Property crimes were 9 and 12 per 1000 population respectively. Both rates were among the lowest recorded for Calgary communities.

== Education ==
The St. Jude Elementary School (Catholic) as well as the Woodbine Elementary public school are located in this neighborhood.

== See also ==
- List of neighbourhoods in Calgary
