= Woodlands, Calgary =

Woodlands
- Neighbourhood
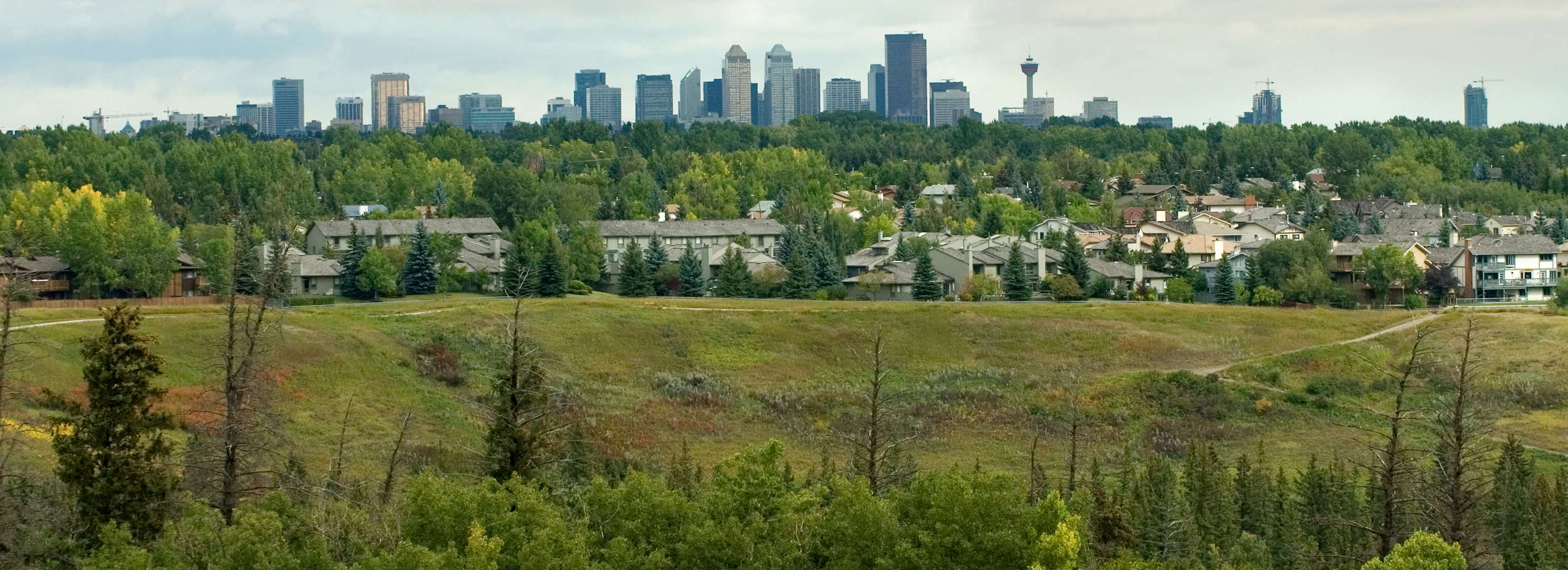
- Residences overlooking Fish Creek Park

- Location of Woodlands in Calgary
- Coordinates: 50°56′29″N 114°06′32″W
- Country: Canada
- Province: Alberta
- City: Calgary
- Quadrant: SW
- Ward: 13
- Established: 1976

Government
  - Mayor: Jeromy Farkas
  - Administrative body: Calgary City Council
  - Councillor: Dan McLean (Communities First)

Area
  - Total: 2.9 km^{2} (1.1 sq mi)
- Elevation: 1,070 m (3,510 ft)

Population (2006)
  - Total: 6,529
  - Average Income: $71,234
- Website: Woodlands Community Association

Woodlands is a residential neighbourhood in the southwest quadrant of Calgary, Alberta. The community is bordered by Fish Creek Provincial Park to the south, 24 Street SW to the west, Anderson Road SW to the north, and 14 Street SW to the east. The Canyon Meadows Golf course is entirely contained within the boundaries of Woodlands.

Woodlands was established in 1976. It is represented in the Calgary City Council by the Ward 13 councillor.

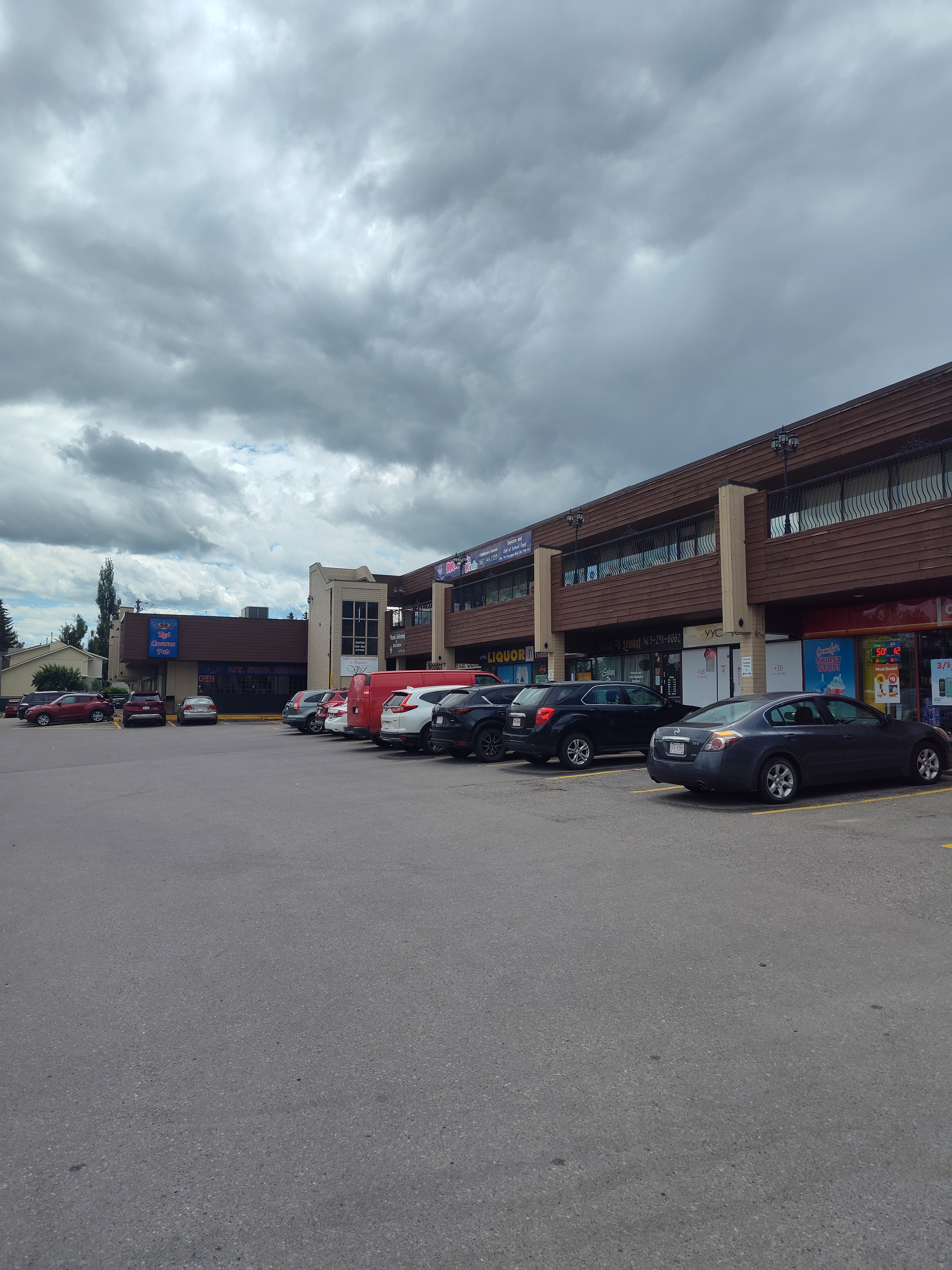
Woodlands Village SURI Plaza - a 2 floor shopping plaza located inside of Woodlands

== Demographics ==
In the City of Calgary's 2012 municipal census, Woodlands had a population of 6,201 living in 2,397 dwellings, a 0% increase from its 2011 population of 6,201. With a land area of 2.8 km^{2} (1.1 sq mi), it had a population density of 2,210/km^{2} (5,740/sq mi) in 2012.

Residents in this community had a median household income of $71,234 in 2000, and there were 14.2% low income residents living in the neighbourhood. As of 2000, 22.9% of the residents were immigrants. A proportion of 11.6% of the buildings were condominiums or apartments, and 24.9% of the housing was used for renting.

== Education ==
Woodlands is home to Woodlands Elementary School (CBE), as well as William Roper Hull School, a K-12 school owned by the CBE in partnership with Hull Services with programs for students with various behavioral, emotional, social and mental challenges. The Tsuu T'Ina Bullhead Adult Education Centre is also situated next to William Roper School.

== See also ==
- List of neighbourhoods in Calgary
- Pineridge, Calgary
- Rundle, Calgary
- Woodbine, Calgary

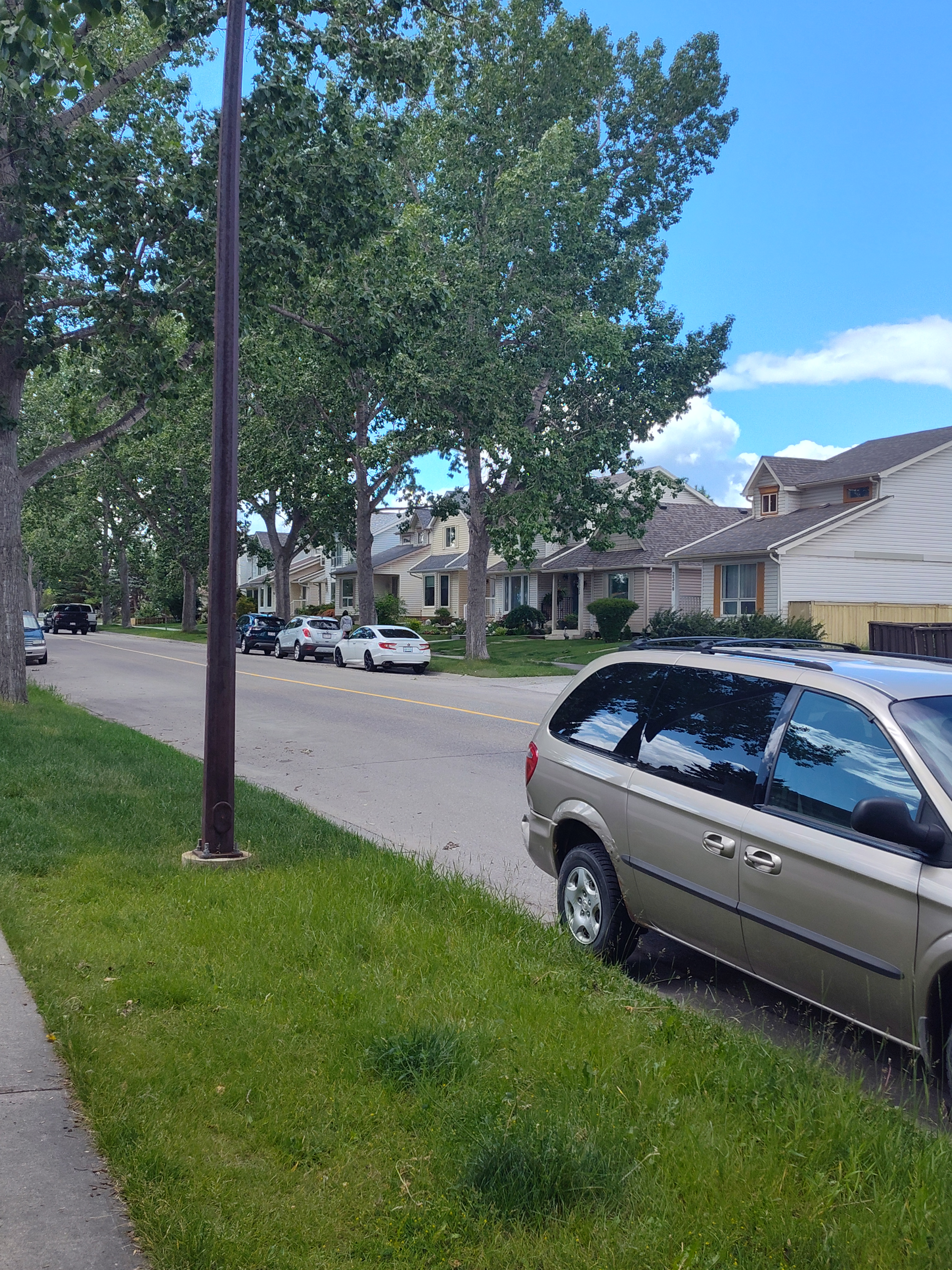
Homes located on Woodview Drive SW inside of the Woodlands community
