= Douglasdale/Douglasglen =

Douglasdale/Glen Douglasdale/Douglas Glen/Quarry Park
- Neighbourhood
- Douglasdale/Douglas Glen
- Location of Douglasdale and Douglas Glen in Calgary
- Coordinates: 50°56′27″N 113°59′21″W
- Country: Canada
- Province: Alberta
- City: Calgary
- Quadrant: SE
- Ward: 11
- Established: 1986

Government
  - Mayor: Jeromy Farkas
  - Administrative body: Calgary City Council
  - Councillor: Mike Jamieson (A Better Calgary)

Area
  - Total: 5.1 km^{2} (2.0 sq mi)
- Elevation: 1,040 m (3,410 ft)

Population (2011)
  - Total: 11,768
- Website: Douglasdale-Douglasglen Community

Douglasdale/Douglas Glen is a residential neighbourhood in the southeast quadrant of Calgary, Alberta. It is bounded by 114 Avenue S to the north, 130 Avenue S to the south, Deerfoot Trail to the east and the Bow River to the west. The Fish Creek Provincial Park borders the neighbourhood to the west.

The community consists of three segments: Douglasdale, Douglas Glen, and Quarry Park.

The community was established in 1986. It is represented in the Calgary City Council by the Ward 11 councillor.

== Demographics ==
In the City of Calgary's 2012 municipal census, Douglasdale/Glen had a population of 11,890 living in 4,217 dwellings, a 1% increase from its 2011 population of 11,768. With a land area of 6.4 km^{2} (2.5 sq mi), it had a population density of 1,858/km^{2} (4,810/sq mi) in 2012.

Residents in this community had a median household income of $85,350 in 2000, and there were 2.4% low income residents living in the neighbourhood. As of 2000, 15.2% of the residents were immigrants. All buildings were single-family detached homes, and 1.7% of the housing was used for renting.

== Crime ==
Crime Data
Year	Crime Rate (/100 pop.)
2018	1.4
2019	1.4
2020	1.2
2021	1.0
2022	1.0
2023	0.9

== Education ==
This neighbourhood has one public elementary school: Douglasdale Elementary School. (K-5, plus a program for Autistic learners) Douglasdale school also has a before and after school program called A-stepahead. It also has a public Catholic elementary/junior high school: Monsignor J. S. Smith School (K-9)

== See also ==
- List of neighbourhoods in Calgary
