= Red Line (Calgary) =

Light rail line in Calgary, Alberta

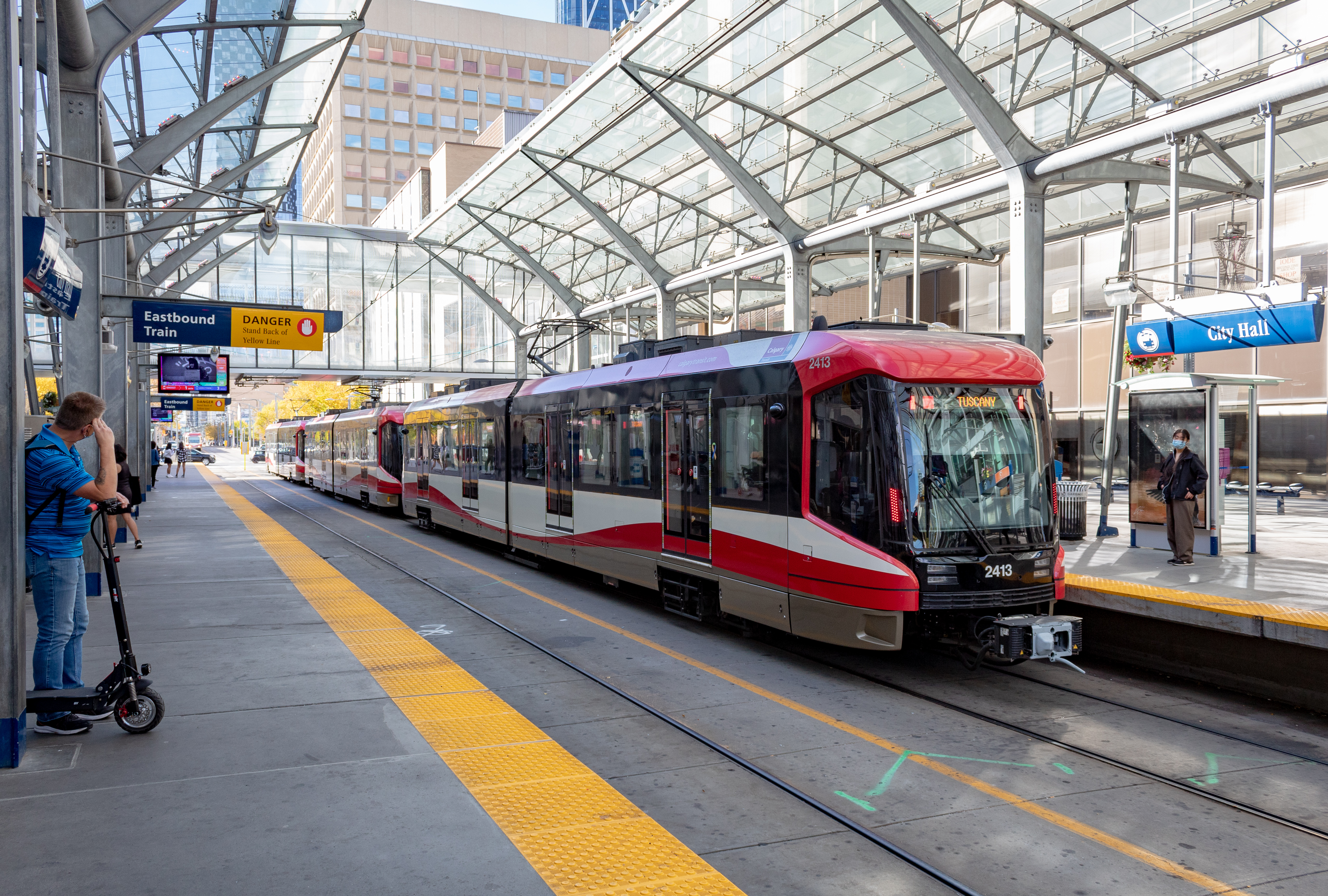
- A Red Line train at City Hall station

Overview
- Status: Operational
- Owner: Calgary Transit
- Locale: Calgary, Alberta, Canada
- Termini: Tuscany (Northwest); Somerset–Bridlewood (South)
- Stations: 28
- Website: Calgary Transit

Service
- Type: Light rail
- System: CTrain
- Route number: 201
- Operator: Calgary Transit

History
- Opened: May 25, 1981

Technical
- Line length: 32.2 km (20.0 mi)
- Number of tracks: 2
- Character: At-grade
- Track gauge: 1,435 mm (4 ft 8 1/2 in) standard gauge
- Electrification: Overhead line, 600 V DC
Route map
Red Line highlighted in red

The Red Line, also known as Route 201, is a light rail transit (LRT) line in Calgary, Alberta, Canada. Together with the Blue Line and future Green Line it makes up Calgary's CTrain network. Following its initial approval in 1976, the Red Line opened in 1981, running from Anderson station in the southeast into downtown. The Red Line has been expanded several times to reach its current state. The Red Line services the northwest quadrant and south end of the city beginning at Tuscany station, runs through the downtown core on 7th Avenue, then proceeds southbound where it terminates at Somerset–Bridlewood station. The section of track running along 7th Avenue is shared with the Blue Line. Future expansion of the Red Line includes rerouting the downtown section below 8th Avenue, which would allow the operation of five-car trains, further increasing capacity.

== History ==
=== Origin ===
The concept of a light rail transit system (LRT) was approved in 1976 by the City of Calgary, with the first 12.9-kilometre (8.0 mi) section running from Anderson Road in the southwest, northbound, and into downtown, opening in 1981. Originally planned for 40,000 passengers per day, this initial section quickly achieved its designed ridership and is now part of the Red Line. Based on the success of the Anderson-downtown section, the city approved a second route which would head northwest towards the University of Calgary and the Southern Alberta Institute of Technology. Opposition to the routing through the neighborhood of Sunnyside resulted in a switch of priority to the northeast, in what would become the Blue Line. The first 9.8-kilometre (6.1 mi) section of the Blue Line opened in 1985. Both lines share a right-of-way through the downtown core. The decision to proceed with the original CTrain expansion northwest (in what would be part of the current Red Line) overcame opposition following Calgary being awarded the 1988 Winter Olympics. The city wanted the CTrain to access McMahon Stadium at the University of Calgary, which served as a venue for the games.

=== Northwest expansion ===
In 1987 the third expansion of the CTrain opened adding an additional 5.8 kilometres (3.6 mi) of line into service towards the northwest, and in 1990 a second northwest expansion of 0.8 kilometres (0.50 mi) to the Brentwood station. In 2000 a reallocation of 5¢ per-litre collected through the provincial gasoline tax helped fund the northwest expansion of the Red Line to Dalhousie station in 2003. This was followed by another extension to Crowfoot station in 2008, and finally to Tuscany station in 2014.

=== Southern expansion ===
The fuel tax reallocation allowed the Red Line to expand to the south to the Fish Creek–Lacombe station in 2001, with a further southern expansion to Somerset–Bridlewood station in 2004.

=== Capacity upgrade ===
Up until the completion of the Fish Creek–Lacombe station, all platforms for the CTrain were originally designed to service three-car trains, although there had been enough space allotted to allow four car trains. Beginning in 2007 construction on station platforms began to expand the entire network to allow four-car trains, with the project being completed in 2017 for CA$300 million. In 2015 Calgary Transit began running four-car trains on the Red Line. The increase from three-car trains realized an additional capacity of 200 passengers per trip.

== Stations and route ==
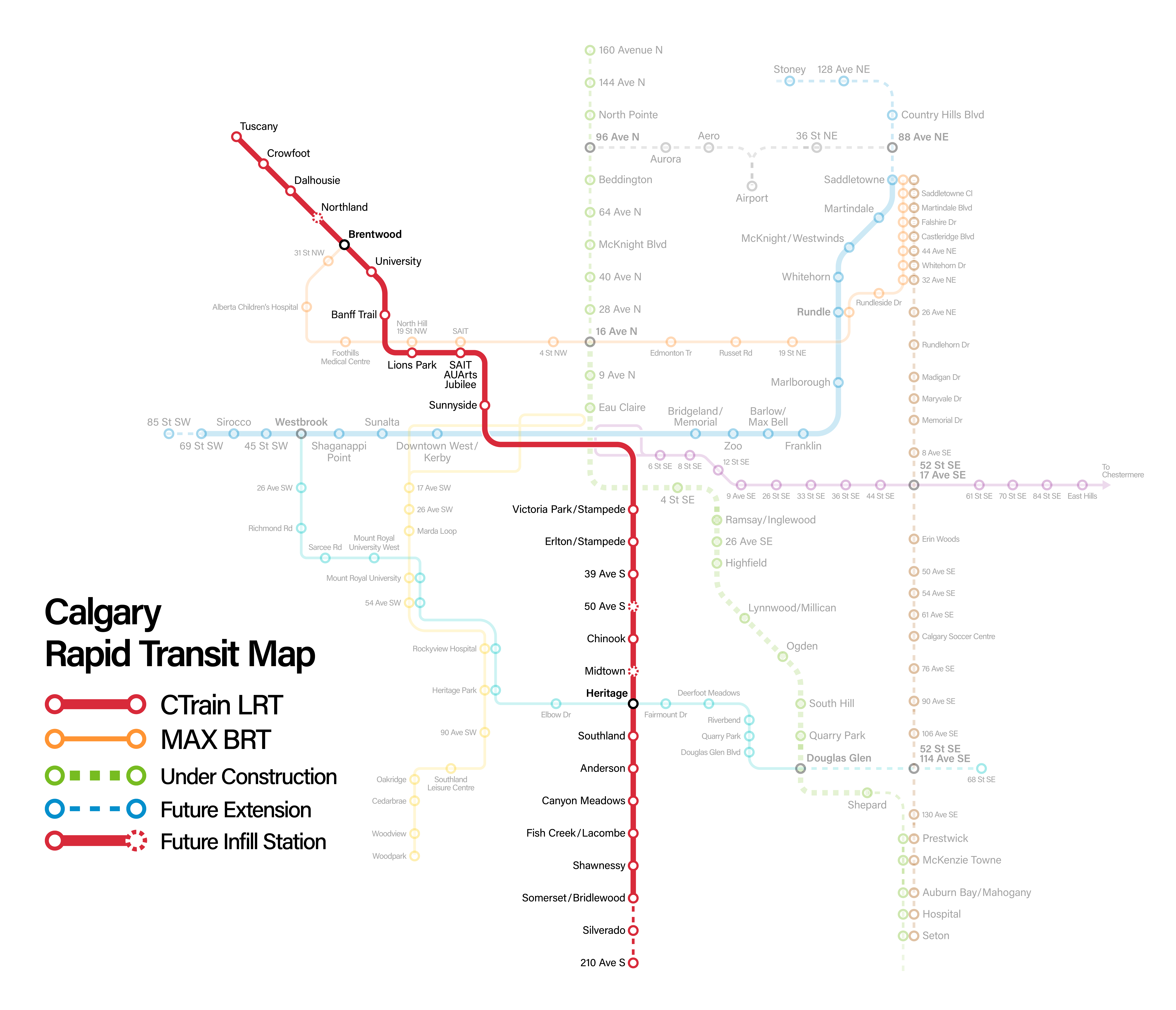
Diagram of the CTrain network, showing the Red Line.

The Red Line begins in the northwest at Tuscany station, running southeast towards Downtown Calgary in the median of Crowchild Trail serving residential neighborhoods. The last station along Crowchild is University station, which serves the University of Calgary. The Red Line then travels underground below 24th Avenue Northwest, and returns above ground where it stops at Banff Trail station, which serves McMahon Stadium. The line continues southeast until it returns underground briefly to pass underneath 16th Avenue North/Trans-Canada Highway, returning to surface at Lions Park station. It then continues eastbound, servicing the Southern Alberta Institute of Technology, the Alberta University of the Arts, and the Jubilee Auditorium at SAIT/AUArts/Jubilee station. Continuing southbound the Red Line serves the neighbourhood of Sunnyside before crossing the Bow River into Downtown Calgary. The downtown section of the Red Line is shared with the Blue Line, beginning at 8 Street Southwest station, across 7th Avenue, and diverging after City Hall station, where the Red Line continues south.

After leaving downtown the Red Line returns underground through the neighborhood of Victoria Park, returning to run parallel to Macleod Trail at grade level. Victoria Park/Stampede station serves the Scotiabank Saddledome and the northern grounds of the Calgary Stampede, while Erlton/Stampede station serves the southern grounds. After Erlton the train returns underground to navigate Macleod Trail, a cemetery, and residential neighborhood, surfacing to reach the 39 Avenue station. It passes briefly underground below 42nd Avenue Southeast, and continues at grade level running adjacent to the Canadian Pacific Railway, crossing streets either via bridge or through controlled crossings, until it reaches its terminus at Somerset–Bridlewood station.

Key
†	Terminus
↓	Southbound only
↖	Northwest-bound only

Station	Opened	Transfers	Notes
Tuscany†	2014	—	—
Crowfoot	2009	—	—
Dalhousie	2003	—	—
Brentwood	1990	MAX Orange	—
University	1987	—	—
Banff Trail	1987	—	—
Lions Park	1987	MAX Orange (Calgary)	Exchange to North Hill
SAIT/AUArts/Jubilee	1987	MAX Orange (Calgary)	—
Sunnyside	1987	—	—
8 Street Southwest↓	1981	Blue Line	Free fare zone
7 Street Southwest↖	1981	Blue Line (Calgary)	Free Fare Zone
6 Street Southwest↓	1981	Blue Line (Calgary)	Free Fare Zone
4 Street Southwest↖	1981	Blue Line (Calgary)	Free Fare Zone
3 Street Southwest↓	1981	Blue Line (Calgary)	Free Fare Zone
1 Street Southwest↖	1981	Blue Line (Calgary)	Free Fare Zone
Centre Street↓	1981	Blue Line (Calgary)	Free Fare Zone
City Hall/Bow Valley College	1981	MAX Yellow; MAX Purple; MAX Green; 500 Airport; 503 Symons Valley	Free Fare Zone
Victoria Park/Stampede	1981	—	—
Erlton/Stampede	1981	—	—
39 Avenue	1981	—	—
Chinook	1981	—	—
Heritage	1981	MAX Teal	—
Southland	1981	—	—
Anderson	1981	—	—
Canyon Meadows	2001	—	—
Fish Creek–Lacombe	2001	—	—
Shawnessy	2004	—	—
Somerset–Bridlewood†	2004	—	—

== Future expansion ==
Expansion of the Red Line is expected to include a rerouting of the downtown 7th Avenue section which is currently shared with the Blue Line to run underground below 8th Avenue. These stations would be built longer than the existing four-car platforms, and would be able to accommodate five-car trains. Extensions of the existing four-car platforms outside of the downtown core would be required, however there is enough land available at existing stations. There is not enough space at the downtown 7th Avenue stations to accommodate five-car trains.

It has also been proposed to add new stations on the existing line. Stations would be added between Brentwood and Dalhousie stations at Northland Drive, between 39 Avenue and Chinook stations, and between Chinook and Heritage stations.

Calgary Transit have planned an extension of the southern leg of the Red Line through two new stations at Silverado and 210 Avenue S. As of August 2022, no funding or schedules have been advanced for the proposed southern extension.

== See also ==
- Blue Line (Calgary)
- Green Line (Calgary)
