= MAX Orange (Calgary) =

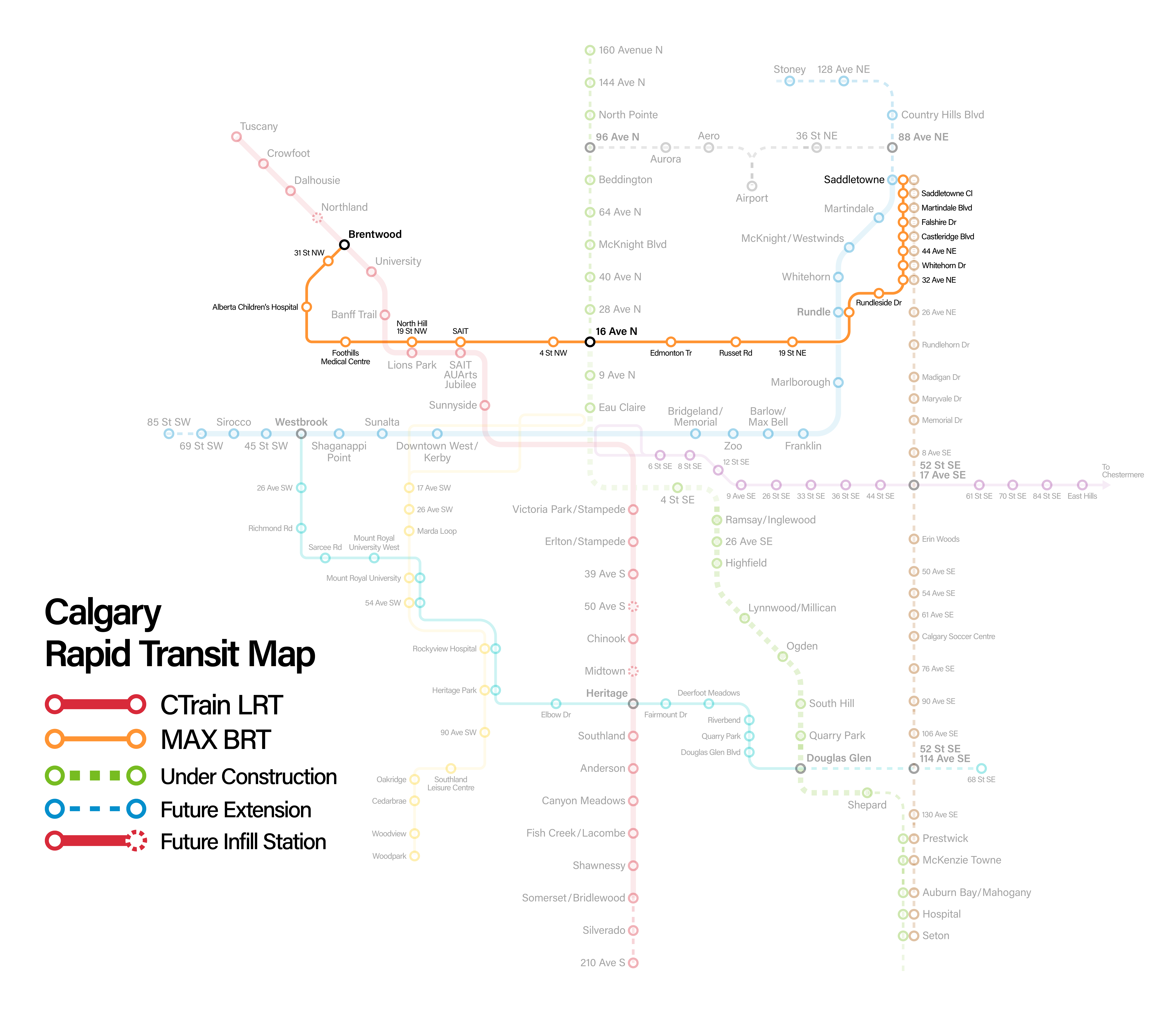
- MAX Orange route

Overview
- System: MAX
- Operator: Calgary Transit
- Began service: November 19, 2018

Route
- Start: Brentwood
- End: Saddletowne
- Length: 14.5 miles (23.3 km)
- Stops: 21

MAX Orange, also known as Route 303 or the North Crosstown BRT, is a bus rapid transit line in Calgary, Alberta. Part of Calgary Transit's MAX network, it largely travels east-west along 16 Avenue N and north-south along 52 Street NE. It connects CTrain stations on the Red and Blue lines to the northwest and northeast quadrants of Calgary.

== Stations and route ==
MAX Orange begins in the northwest at Brentwood station on the Red Line, travelling west to the Alberta Children's Hospital and Foothills Medical Centre. From Foothills Medical Centre, MAX Orange travels east along 16 Avenue N before turning north along 36 Street NE to Rundle station on the Blue Line. MAX Orange then travels east along 32 Avenue NE and north along 52 Street NE to Saddletowne station, the terminus of the Blue Line and MAX Orange.

Key
| † | Terminus |

| Station | Opened | Route transfers |
|---|---|---|
| Brentwood† | 1990 | Red Line |
| 31 St NW | 2018 | — |
| Alberta Children's Hospital | 2018 | — |
| Foothills Medical Centre | 2018 | — |
| North Hill | 2018 | Red Line (Calgary) |
| SAIT/AUArts/Jubilee | 1987 | Red Line (Calgary) |
| 4 St NW | 2018 | — |
| Centre St N | 2018 | MAX Green |
| Edmonton Tr | 2018 | — |
| Russet Rd | 2018 | — |
| 19 St NE | 2018 | — |
| Rundle | 1985 | Blue Line |
| Rundleside Dr | 2018 | — |
| 32 Ave NE | 2018 | — |
| Whitehorn Dr | 2018 | — |
| 44 Ave NE | 2018 | — |
| Castleridge Bv | 2018 | — |
| Falshire Dr | 2018 | — |
| Martindale Bv | 2018 | — |
| Saddletowne Ci | 2018 | — |
| Saddletowne† | 2012 | Blue Line (Calgary) |

== See also ==
- MAX Yellow
- MAX Teal
- MAX Purple
- MAX
- Calgary Transit
