= Blue Line (Calgary) =

Light rail line in Calgary, Alberta

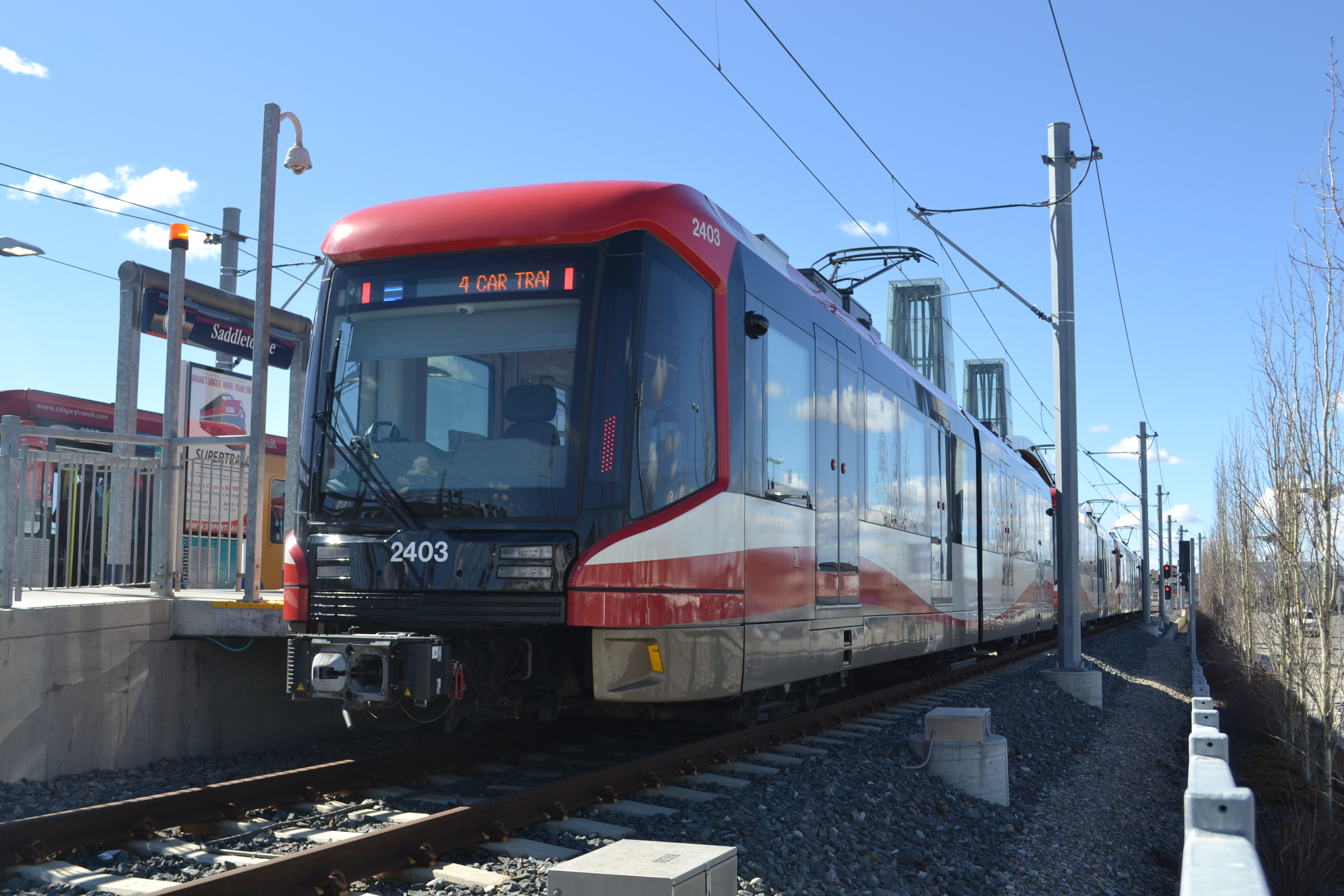
- A Blue Line train at Saddletowne station

Overview
- Status: Operational
- Owner: Calgary Transit
- Locale: Calgary, Alberta, Canada
- Termini: 69 Street (West); Saddletowne (Northeast)
- Stations: 25
- Website: Calgary Transit

Service
- Type: Light rail
- System: CTrain
- Route number: 202
- Operator: Calgary Transit

History
- Opened: April 29, 1985

Technical
- Line length: 23 km (14 mi)
- Number of tracks: 2
- Character: At-grade, elevated, underground
- Track gauge: 1,435 mm (4 ft 8 1/2 in) standard gauge
- Electrification: Overhead line, 600 V DC
Route map
Blue Line highlighted in blue

The Blue Line, also known as Route 202, is a light rail transit (LRT) line in Calgary, Alberta, Canada. Partnered with the Red Line, and future Green Line it makes up Calgary's CTrain network. Following its initial approval in 1976, the Red Line opened in 1981, with the first trains running on what is now the Blue Line in 1985.

== History ==
=== Origin ===
The concept of a light rail transit system (LRT) was approved in 1976 by the City of Calgary, with the first 12.9-kilometre (8.0 mi) section running from Anderson Road in the southwest, northbound, and into downtown, opening in 1981. Originally planned for 40,000 passengers per day, this initial section quickly achieved its designed ridership and is now part of the Red Line. Based on the success of the Anderson-downtown section, the city approved a second route which would head northwest towards the University of Calgary and the Southern Alberta Institute of Technology. Opposition to the routing through the neighborhood of Sunnyside resulted in a switch of priority to the northeast, in what would become the Blue Line. The median of some main roads had already been allocated to serve as the right of way for what would become the CTrain's Blue Line, and the first 9.8-kilometre (6.1 mi) section opened in 1985, before the originally proposed northwestern expansion. Both lines share a right-of-way through the downtown core.

=== Northeast expansion ===
The Blue Line's first expansion was to McKnight–Westwinds station in 2007. with Martindale station and Saddletowne (the current terminus) opening in 2012.

=== Western expansion ===
In February 2008 the Western expansion of the CTrain began, extending the line from downtown towards 69 Street SW, and adding an additional six stations. The Western expansion opened at the end of 2012, ahead of the planned 2013 opening.

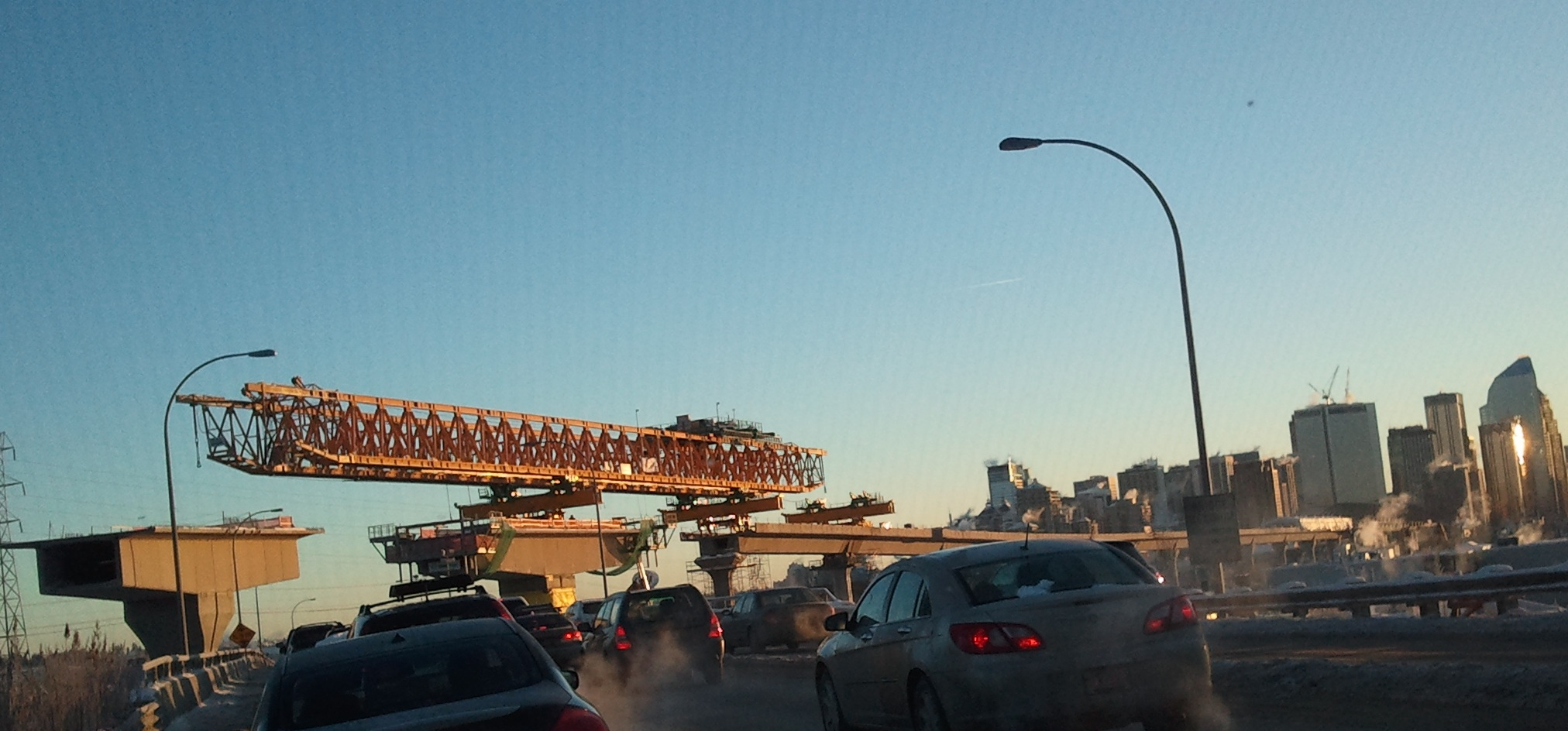
Construction of the western extension of what is now the Blue Line.

=== Capacity upgrade ===
Up until the completion of the Red Line's Fish Creek–Lacombe station, all platforms for the CTrain were originally designed to service three-car trains, although there had been enough space allotted to allow four-car trains. Beginning in 2007 construction on station platforms began to expand the entire network to allow four-car trains, with the project being completed in 2017 for CA$300 million. In 2017, Calgary Transit began running four-car trains on the Blue Line. The increase from three-car trains realized an additional capacity of 200 passengers per trip.

== Stations and route ==
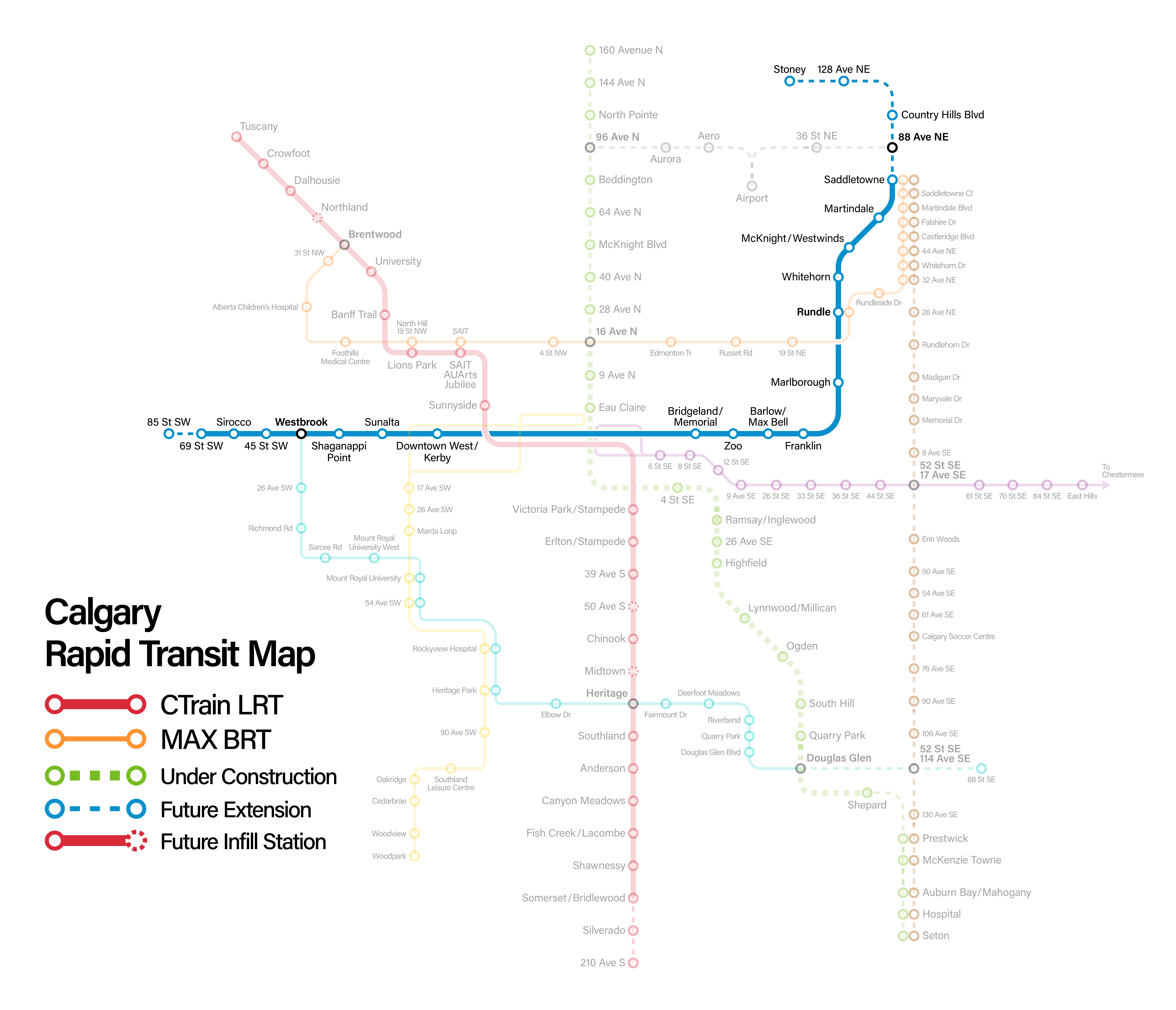
Diagram of the CTrain network, showing the Blue Line.

Starting at 69 Street station, the Blue line runs along 17 Avenue SW, crossing Sarcee Trail, passes briefly underground towards Westbrook Mall, and then follows along Bow Trail. The line then continues to Downtown Calgary where it shares a right of way with the Red Line along 7 Avenue S. The two lines diverge after City Hall station, where it turns north to cross the Bow River, and runs along the median of Memorial Drive, crossing Deerfoot Trail (Highway 2), to 36 Street NE, where it turns northbound, continuing within the median of 36 Street NE, crossing 16 Avenue NE (Highway 1 / Trans-Canada Highway), and McKnight Boulevard. After McKnight Boulevard, 36 Street NE turns to Métis Trail, and the Blue Line passes under a bridge in the northbound lane running parallel to the road until Martindale station, at which point it turns northeast to its terminus at Saddletowne station.

Key
†	Terminus
←	Westbound only
→	Eastbound only

Station	Opened (rebuilt)	Transfers	Notes
69 St †	2012	–	–
Sirocco	2012	–	–
45 St	2012	–	–
Westbrook	2012	MAX Teal	–
Shaganappi Point	2012	–	–
Sunalta	2012	–	–
Downtown West–Kerby	2012	–	Free Fare Zone
8 St Southwest →	1981 (2009)	Red Line	Free Fare Zone
7 St Southwest ←	1981 (2009)	Red Line (Calgary)	Free Fare Zone
6 St Southwest →	1981 (2009)	Red Line (Calgary)	Free Fare Zone
4 St Southwest ←	1981 (2011)	Red Line (Calgary)	Free Fare Zone
3 St Southwest →	1981 (2010)	Red Line (Calgary)	Free Fare Zone
1 St Southwest ←	1981 (2005)	Red Line (Calgary)	Free Fare Zone
Centre St →	1981 (2000)	Red Line (Calgary)	Free Fare Zone
City Hall/Bow Valley College	1981 (2011)	MAX Yellow; MAX Purple; MAX Green; 500 Airport; 503 Symons Valley	Free Fare Zone
Bridgeland/Memorial	1985 (2014)	–	–
Zoo	1985 (2014)	–	–
Barlow/Max Bell	1985 (2014)	–	–
Franklin	1985 (2013)	–	–
Marlborough	1985 (2013)	–	–
Rundle	1985 (2013)	MAX Orange	–
Whitehorn	1985 (2011)	–	–
McKnight–Westwinds	2007	–	
Martindale	2012	–	–
Saddletowne †	2012	100 Airport	–

== Future expansion ==
=== Northeast leg ===
The city of Calgary published a study in 2012 describing a 7.5-kilometre (4.7 mi) extension for the northeast leg of the Blue Line beyond the existing terminus at Saddletowne station, to run north along the west side of 60 Street NE, continuing west along the north side of 128 Avenue NE, then running north along the west side of 32 Street NE. One at-grade crossing would be created at 60 St and 88 Ave; the route would be grade-separated at the crossings of Airport Trail (above grade), Country Hills Blvd (below grade), 128 Ave (below), and Metis Trail (above). The study included four stations:

- 88 Avenue: an at-grade station at 88 Avenue NE and 60 Street NE, with 500 park and ride stalls
- Country Hills Boulevard: a below-grade station at Country Hills Boulevard and 60 Street NE
- 128 Avenue: an at-grade station at 128 Avenue NE and Redstone Street, with 200 parking spaces
- Stoney Trail: the terminal at-grade station at 32 Street NE and Barlow Crescent, with 100 parking spaces

The four stations were studied with side-loading platforms, but the proposed terminal station at Stoney Trail would have sufficient space for a centre-loading platform. 230 m (750 ft) of tail tracks for LRV storage would be built north of the Stoney Trail station. By 2017, the proposed northeast leg extension had been truncated to three stations (ending at 128 Ave) and 5 km (3.1 mi). However, the project is not included in the City's mobility plan and has yet to be funded.

The same 2012 study included concepts to provide transit connections from Calgary International Airport to either Saddletowne or the proposed 88 Ave station using light rail, tram, or bus services. The potential airport connector rail line along Airport Trail could be extended further west to connect with the proposed Green Line north-central leg, specifically at the future 96th Ave N station.

=== West leg ===
An extension west from the current terminus at 69 Street to a future station at Aspen Woods has been planned but not funded. The Aspen Woods station would be at approximately the intersection of 17 Avenue and 85 Street SW.

== See also ==
- Red Line (Calgary)
- Green Line (Calgary)
