= Heritage Park Historical Village =

Living history museum in Calgary, Alberta, Canada

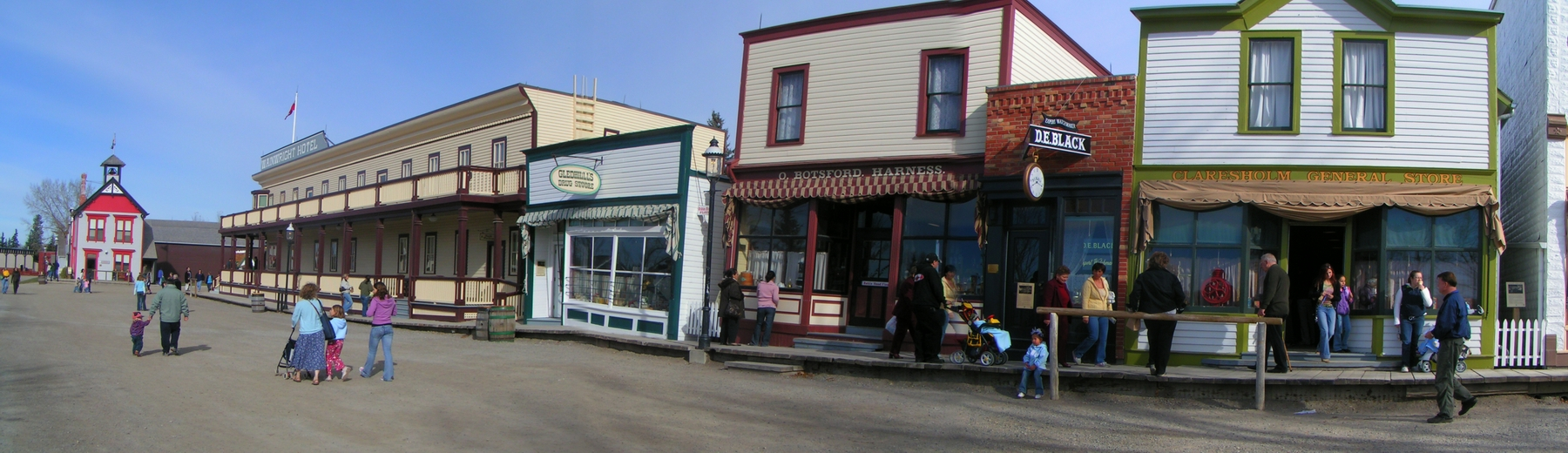

- Location in Calgary
- Established: 1964
- Location: Calgary, Alberta
- Coordinates: 50.98404°N 114.10554°W
- Type: Living History Museum
- CEO: Lindsey Galloway
- Public transit access: Heritage C-Train station MT MAX Teal; MY MAX Yellow
- Website: Heritage Park

Heritage Park Historical Village is a living history museum in Calgary, Alberta, Canada, on 127 acres (51 ha) of parkland on the banks of the Glenmore Reservoir. As one of Canada's largest living history museums, it is among the city's most visited tourist attractions. Exhibits span western Canadian history from the 1860s to the 1950s. Many of the buildings are historical and were transported to the park to be placed on display. Others are re-creations of actual buildings. Most of the structures are furnished and decorated with genuine artifacts. Staff dress in historic costume, and antique automobiles and horse-drawn vehicles service the site. The park opened on July 1, 1964.

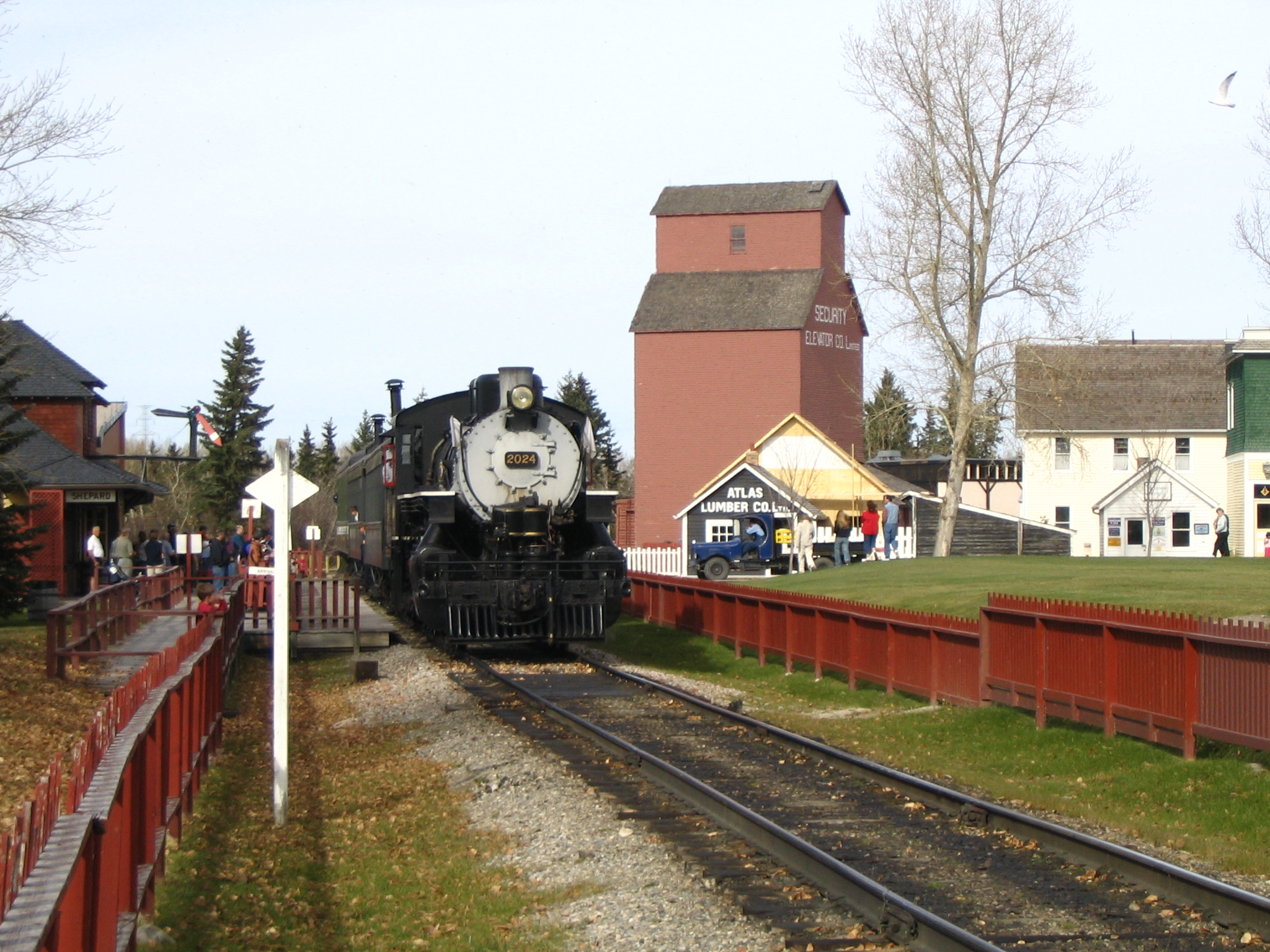
Canadian Pacific Railway 0-6-0 no.2024 at Heritage Park

== Exhibits ==
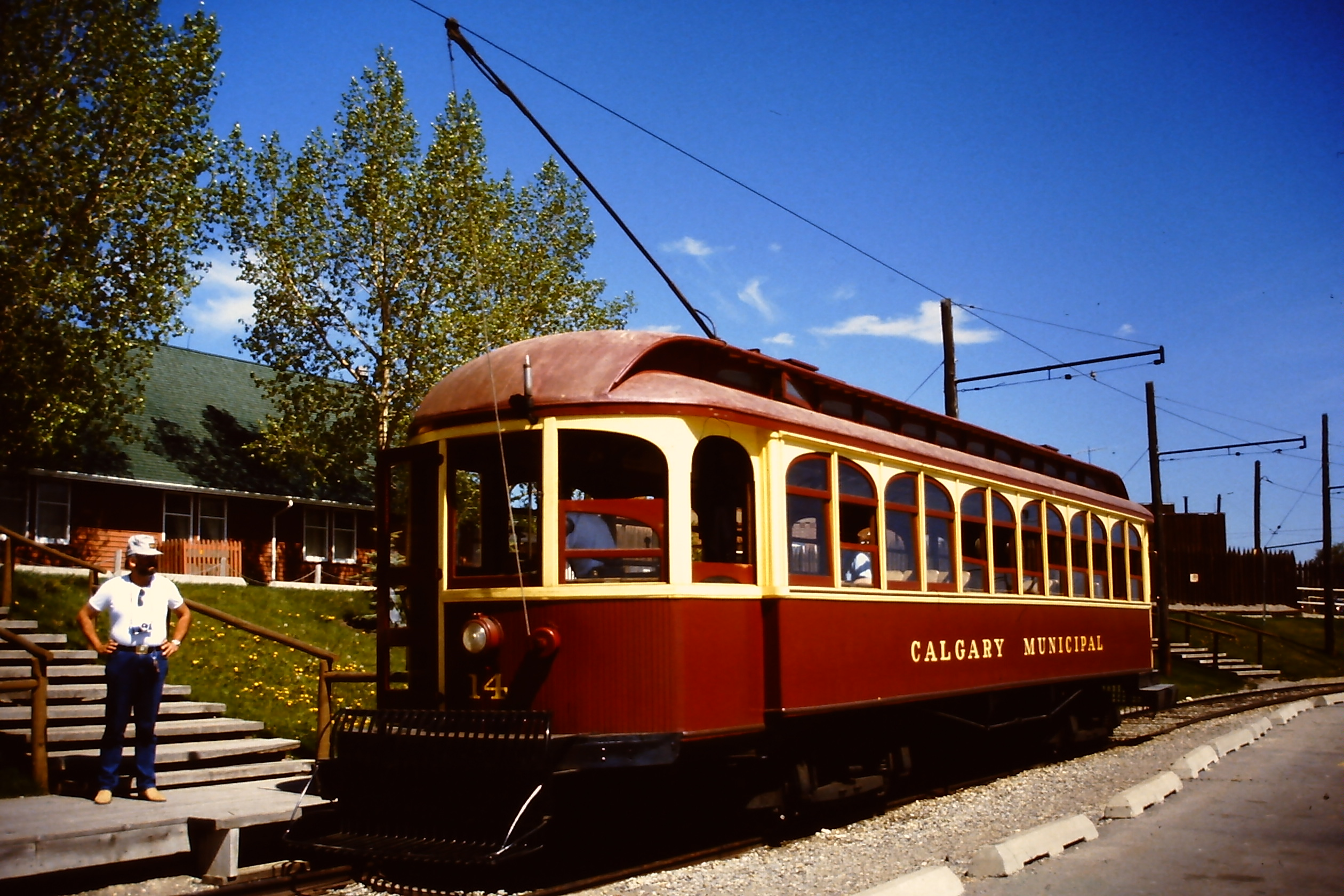
Streetcar

Heritage Park has over 100 exhibits including:

- A passenger train, drawn by one of the park's two working steam locomotives.
- A Railway roundhouse built in 1981, and car shop, which has an operational turntable.
- A streetcar from Calgary's former streetcar system, Calgary Street Railway.
- A 1964 re-creation of a lake paddle steamer, S.S. Moyie, which visitors can ride around the Glenmore Reservoir.
- A railway Prairie town re-creation.
- The pre-railway settlement village. and replica Hudson's Bay Company fort.
- An antique midway that features working historical amusement park rides.
- The First Nations Encampment representing the Indigenous peoples in southern Alberta in the 19th century.
- Horse-drawn wagons.
- The 1913 Little Synagogue on the Prairie.
- An exhibition space called Innovation Crossing which overlooks Glenmore Reservoir, featuring immersive displays about energy.
- Gasoline Alley Museum featuring antique gasoline pumps, cars and memorabilia.
- Heritage Plaza, featuring Haskayne Mercantile Block and a restaurant.
- A Ridge focused on rural occupations.

Many of the exhibit spaces are used year-round for special events such as weddings, corporate meetings, company barbecues, fundraisers, among other things.

== See also ==
- Fort Edmonton Park
- List of heritage railways in Canada
- List of museums in Alberta
