= Brentwood station (Calgary) =

Light rail station in Calgary, Alberta, Canada

Brentwood
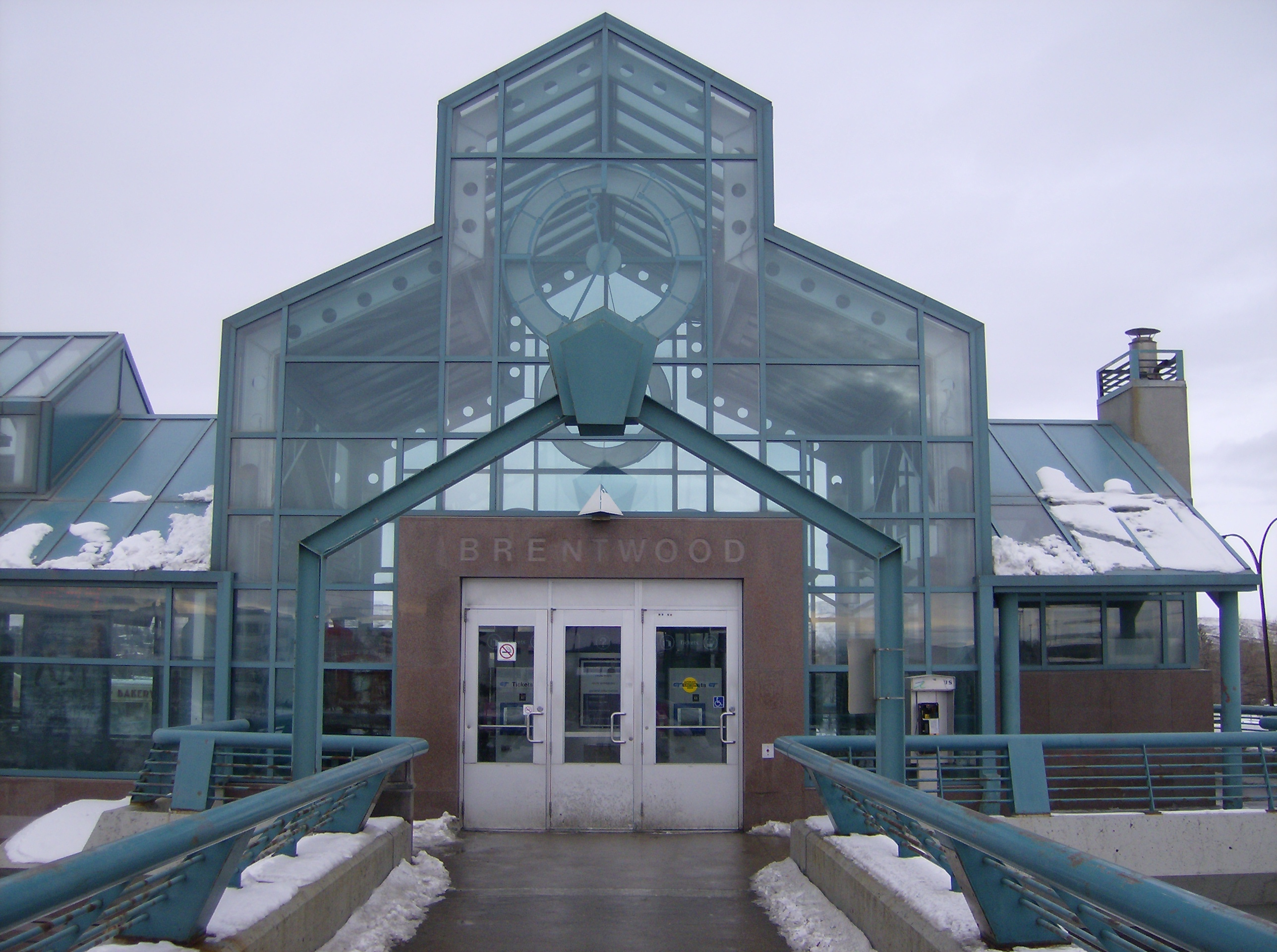

General information
- Location: 4099 Crowchild Trail NW
- Coordinates: 51°05′15″N 114°07′56″W
- Platforms: Center-loading platform

Construction
- Structure type: At-grade
- Parking: 1381 spaces
- Accessible: yes

History
- Opened: 1987; 39 years ago
- Rebuilt: 2011; 15 years ago (platform extension) 2020; 6 years ago (pedestrian bridge renovations) 2023; 3 years ago (platform canopy replacement)

Services
Preceding station	Calgary Transit	Following station
Dalhousie toward Tuscany	Red Line	University toward Somerset–Bridlewood
Location

Brentwood Station is a Calgary C-Train light rail station on the Red Line, between University Station southbound and Dalhousie Station northbound. The station is located in the middle of Crowchild Trail, wedged between the communities of Brentwood to the north, and Varsity to the south. The station acts as a transfer point, connecting with the bus routes of MAX Orange, North Pointe, Foothills Medical Centre, Dalhousie, Chinook, Greenwood/Brentwood, Market Mall, Downtown West, Nolan Hill, and Valley Ridge.

== Location and station layout ==
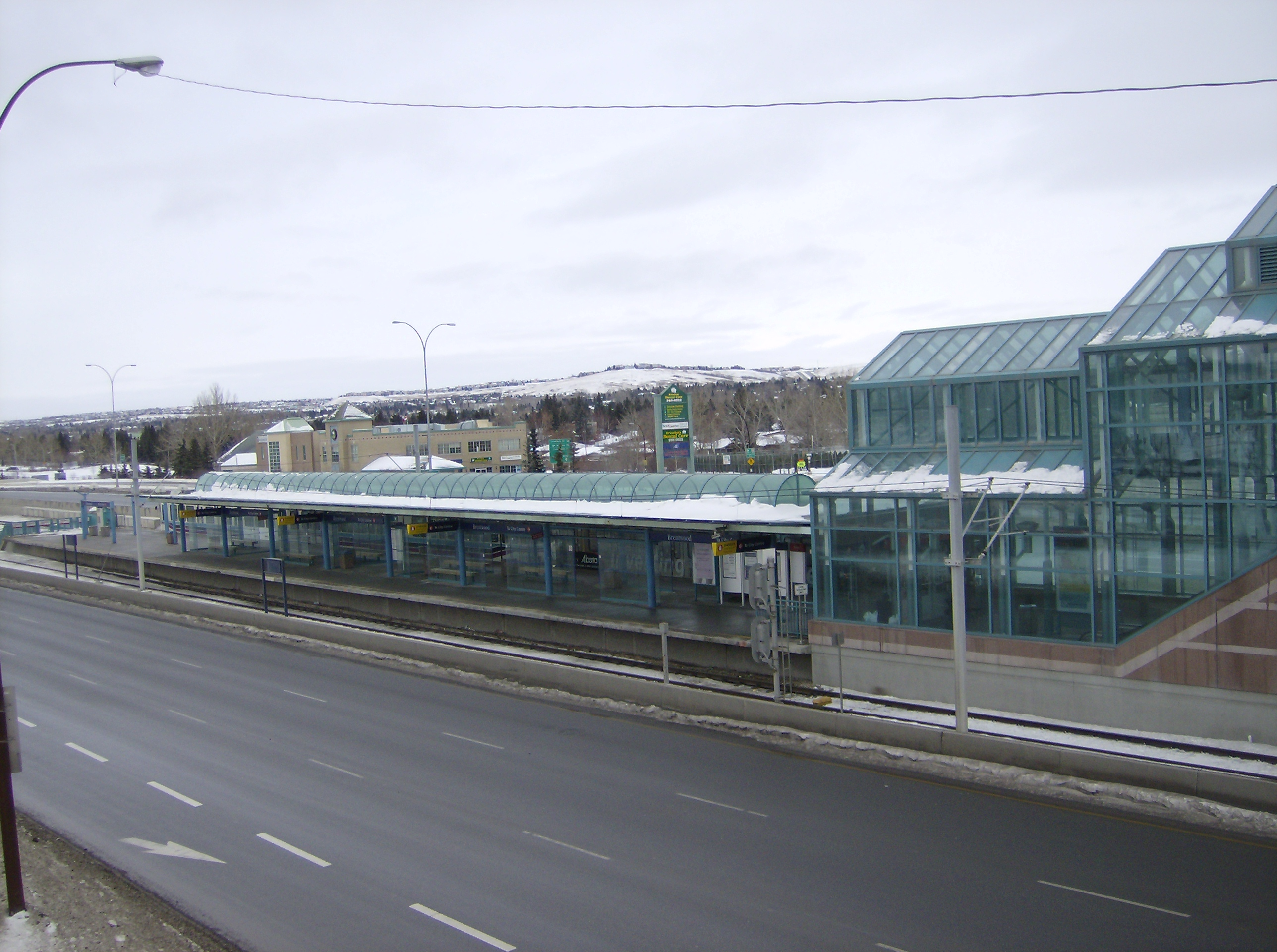
Brentwood station platform

The station has two tracks and a single island platform. The station is located in the middle of Crowchild Trail, with pedestrian overpasses connecting the station to either side of the road. To the southwest are the bus stations and a park and ride with 950 stalls. To the northeast are a Calgary Co-op and Brentwood Mall, and to the southwest there is the University Research Park.

The station serves the communities of Brentwood and Varsity.

=== Architecture ===
When the line was extended, Robert LeBlond from the firm LeBlond Partnership was asked to design the new station building. The transit designers knew that the Brentwood extension would be the last extension for many years, so they wanted an impressive design. LeBlond designed the building to resemble a grain elevator. The station building won the Portland Cement Award of Excellence for its use of concrete, and the Alberta Association of Architects successfully nominated the building for inclusion in the Chronicle of Significant Alberta Architecture.

== History ==
Brentwood Station was proposed in a study by transit consultants Hawley Simpson and John F. Curtin entitled Transit for Calgary's Future. The study proposed a northwest–southeast line from Brentwood to Haysboro (the equivalent of Southland Station).

Brentwood Station was created as part of a 0.8 kilometres (0.50 mi) extension that was opened on August 31, 1990. It would be the northwest terminus until 2003, when Dalhousie station was opened.

In 2008, the station registered an average of 14,900 boardings per weekday.

In May 2010, the federal government announced that they would be cooperating with the municipal government to extend the station's platform to accommodate the new four-car trains.

In September 2020, the station's pedestrian bridges underwent a renovation, which included concrete rehabilitation and lighting upgrades along the stairs, ramps, and the bridge, and new handrails and guardrails. Renovation ended in winter of 2021.

== Buses ==
The following routes have a connection at Brentwood station:

- 8 - Foothills Medical Centre / 8 - North Pointe
- 9 - Chinook / 9 - Dalhousie
- 38 - North Crosstown Saddletowne
- 53 - Greenwood
- 65 - Downtown West / 65 - Market Mall
- 82 - Nolan Hill
- 108 - Valley Ridge via Paskapoo Slopes
- - MAX Orange Saddletowne
- Falcon Bus - Cochrane

== Crime ==
During the month of March 2023, an underground drug operation along the Calgary C-Train system would get disrupted. Officers seized the substances of fentanyl, methamphetamine, cocaine, morphine, and Xanax. Multiple weapons such as 21 knives, two machetes, two hatchets, a handgun, and a can of bear spray were also seized by police. 40 people would get arrested between multiple stations, Brentwood along with Franklin, Southland, Marlborough, Heritage, Sunalta, Rundle, Whitehorn, Chinook, Crowfoot, 8th Street SW, Anderson, Dalhousie, Westbrook Stations would have arrests relating to the aforementioned drug trade.

Police were called to Brentwood LRT Station just before 11:00 PM on Tuesday September 9, 2014. Officers found a man in his 20s suffering from stab wounds.

On Monday, February 3, 2020 at 3:40 PM, reports that a man had been stabbed came in from Brentwood Station. An altercation had initially happened at Dalhousie Station, but the person was followed onto the train and was attacked at Brentwood.
