= Quarry Park =

Mixed-use development in Calgary, Alberta, Canada

Coordinates: 50.960°N 114.013°W

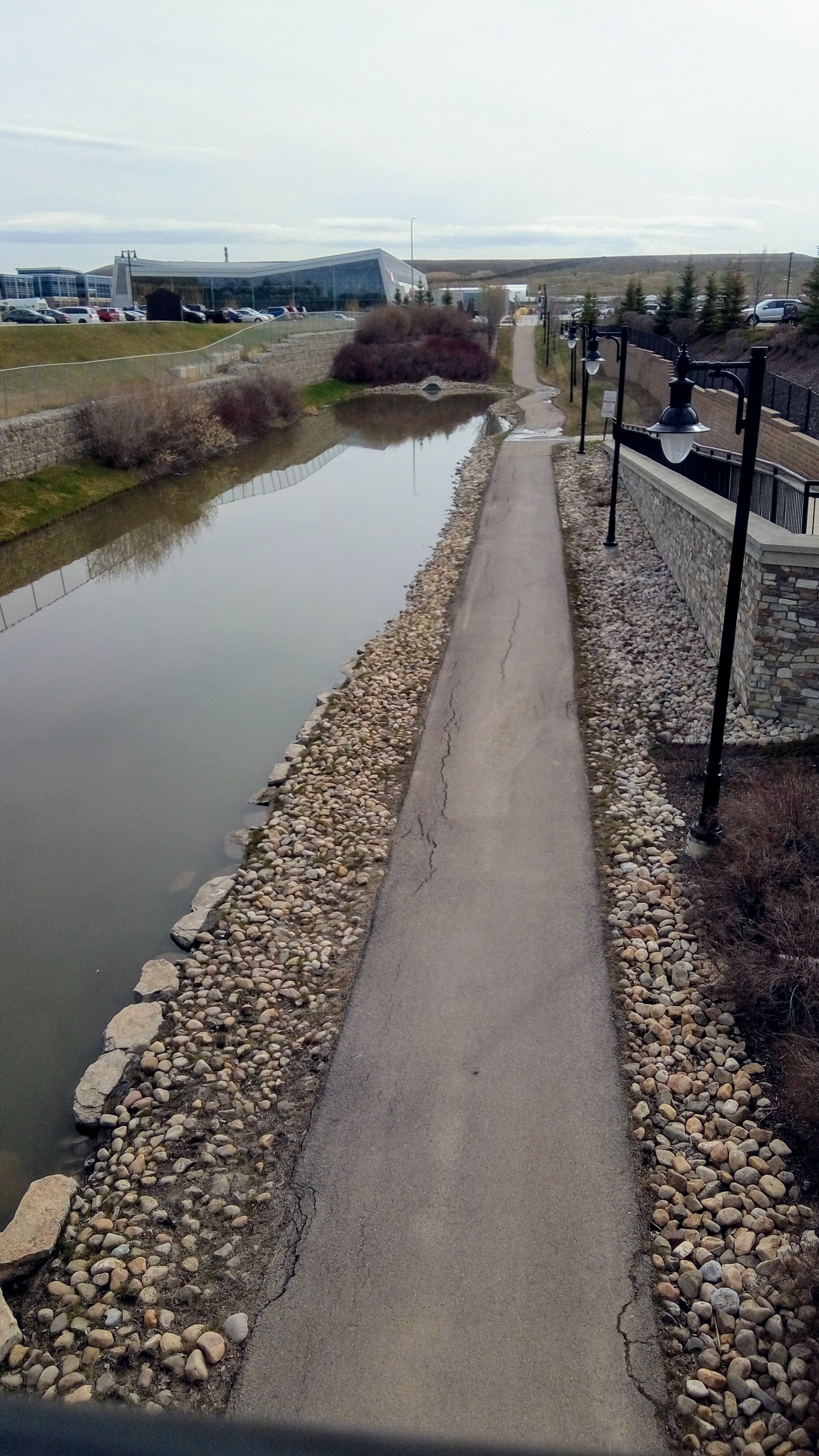
A walkway along a storm pond in Quarry Park

Quarry Park is a mixed-use development in Calgary, Alberta, Canada. For 50 years it was a gravel extraction site in the southeast quadrant of the city, surrounded by residential communities but used solely for industrial gravel production. In 2005, the land was purchased by a local development corporation and evolved into the development that it is today. Comprising over 400 acres of land, Quarry Park is now home to a market, a variety of residential developments, riverside green space and corporate office buildings including Imperial Oil and Remington Development Corporation.

Throughout Calgary, nearly 800 kilometers of pathways connect citizens to the natural landscape of the city. Because of this, Quarry Park residents have access to a 50-acre nature reserve.

Built on the banks of the Bow River, Quarry Park has been designed based on many flood mitigation strategies to ensure the development does not face devastation at the hands of flooding. The Bow River flooded in the spring of 2013, causing major damage to many areas in Calgary and its surrounding communities. Quarry Park, despite being located in an evacuation zone, remained completely dry.

The engineers of Quarry Park studied polders extensively, which are low-lying areas near water and often found in the Netherlands and other seaside countries. Based on the engineering of polders, Quarry Park was built with an insulated, reinforced riprap berm designed to withstand a one-in-100 year flood event. Other precautions were also taken including a stormwater lift station to discharge rainwater into the Bow River, and overland canals to divert and filter water.

All Quarry Park buildings are built to LEED gold standards and used recycled materials, including demolished and crushed asphalt, or concrete and aggregate from roads, parking lots and buildings. To manage stormwater, Quarry Park uses a linear pond and creek system that transports and cleans water before it flows back into the Bow River.
