= 16 Avenue N =

Road in Calgary, Alberta, Canada

16 Avenue N
- Route Transcanadienne
- Highway 1 Trans-Canada Highway
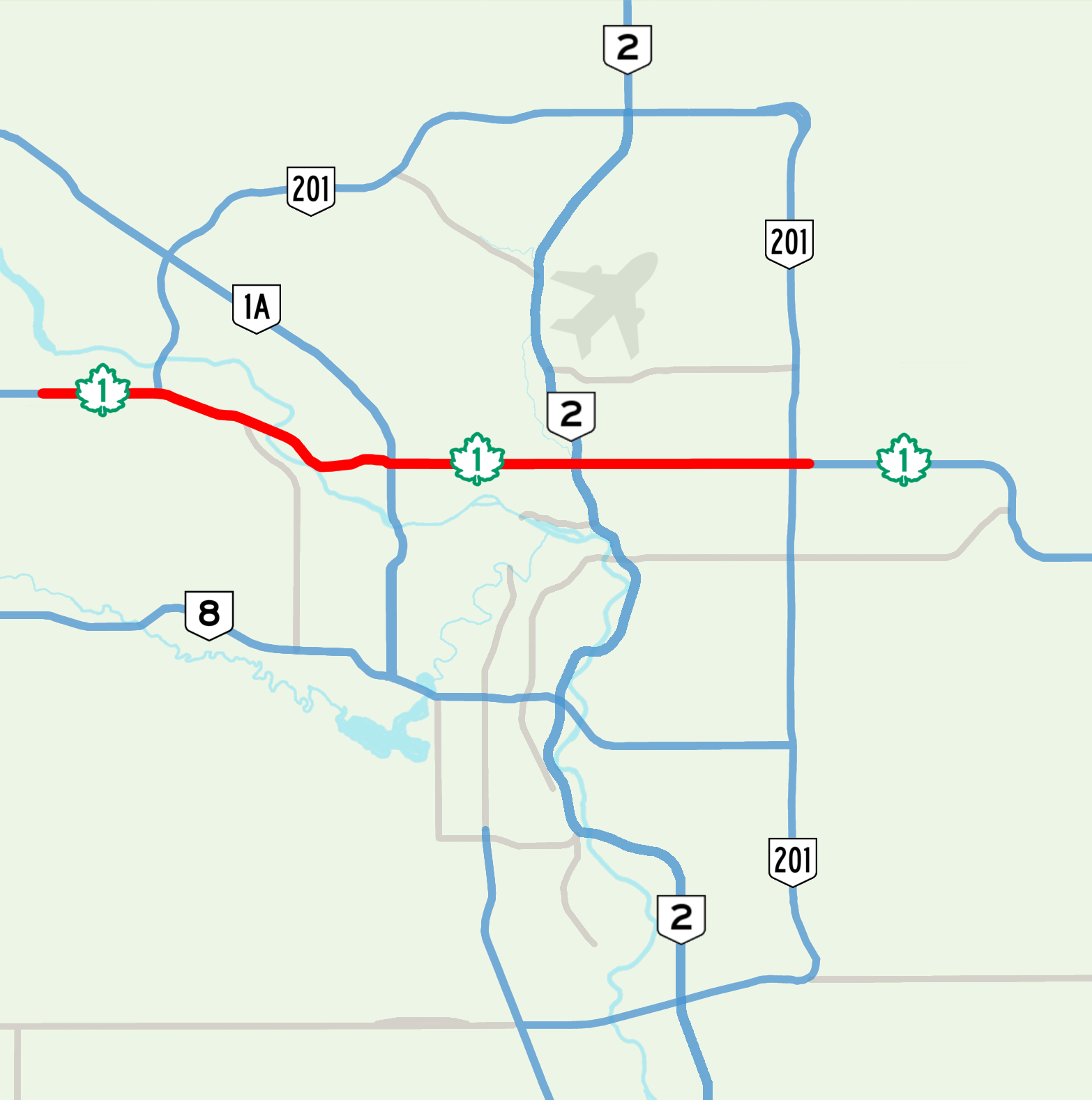
- 16 Avenue N highlighted in red

Route information
- Maintained by City of Calgary
- Length: 26.5 km (16.5 mi)

Major junctions
- West end: Highway 1 (TCH) west
- Stoney Trail NW (Highway 201); Sarcee Trail; Shaganappi Trail; Centre Street; Edmonton Trail; Deerfoot Trail (Highway 2); Barlow Trail; Stoney Trail NE (Highway 201)
- East end: Highway 1 (TCH) east

Location
- Country: Canada
- Province: Alberta
- Major cities: Calgary

Highway system
- Trans-Canada Highway; Alberta Numbered Highway Network; List; Former

Neighbourhoods
- List...: Crestmont; Valley Ridge; Greenwood/Greenbriar; Bowness; Montgomery; Parkdale; University Heights; St. Andrews Heights; Banff Trail; Hounsfield Heights/Briar Hill; Capitol Hill; Mount Pleasant; Rosedale; Tuxedo Park; Crescent Heights; Winston Heights-Mountview; Renfrew; Vista Heights; Mayland Heights; Sunridge Industrial Park; Meridian Industrial Park; Franklin Industrial Park; Rundle; Marlborough; Pineridge; Marlborough Park; Monterey Park; Abbeydale

16 Avenue N is a major road in Calgary, Alberta, that forms a 26.5-kilometre (16.5 mi) segment of Highway 1 (Trans-Canada Highway) and connects Calgary to Banff and Medicine Hat. It is a four to six-lane principal arterial expressway at its extremities, but is an urban arterial road between the Bow River and Bowness Road, and also between Crowchild Trail and Deerfoot Trail. Due to Calgary's quadrant system, it is known as 16 Avenue NW west of Centre Street and 16 Avenue NE to the east.

== Route description ==
=== 16 Avenue NW ===
The Trans-Canada Highway in Alberta originates at the British Columbia border, where it proceeds east through Banff National Park to Calgary and becomes 16 Avenue NW. It enters the city as a freeway and remains as such through the far western portions. It first intersects Valley Ridge Boulevard / Crestmont Boulevard before a major interchange at the Stoney Trail (Highway 201) ring road. Signage recommending that traffic en route to the International Airport, Edmonton, and Medicine Hat use Stoney Trail as a bypass. It continues past Canada Olympic Park to an intersection at Bowfort Road, where construction of a single point urban interchange was completed on August 31, 2017. It passes along the southern boundary of the former town of Bowness and begins to descend into the Bow River valley where it intersects Sarcee Trail, an expressway providing a bypass option to Highway 2 south. 16 Avenue NW transitions from a freeway to a four-lane urban arterial road as it crosses the Bow River and the CPR mainline tracks. Between the city limits and Sarcee Trail, 16 Avenue NW separates the northwest and southwest quadrants of Calgary.

After crossing the Bow River, 16 Avenue NW passes through the former village of Montgomery after which it becomes a short expressway that crosses Bowness Road (signed as Memorial Drive for eastbound traffic), Shaganappi Trail, and exits the Bow River valley. It passes the Alberta Children's Hospital and Foothills Medical Centre before crossing University Drive, which provides access to the University of Calgary, McMahon Stadium, and access to southbound Crowchild Trail. After crossing Crowchild Trail, it becomes a six-lane urban arterial road with numerous signalized intersections and extensive, increasingly dense commercial development. It passes Motel Village, a cluster of motels which were constructed due to its proximity to the Trans-Canada Highway, which is accessible via a signalized service road and Banff Trail, which also doubles as the access road northbound Crowchild Trail. It passes by North Hill Centre (Calgary's first shopping mall), 14 Street NW, and Southern Alberta Institute of Technology (SAIT) continuing east and intersects Centre Street, leaving the northwest quadrant.

=== 16 Avenue NE ===
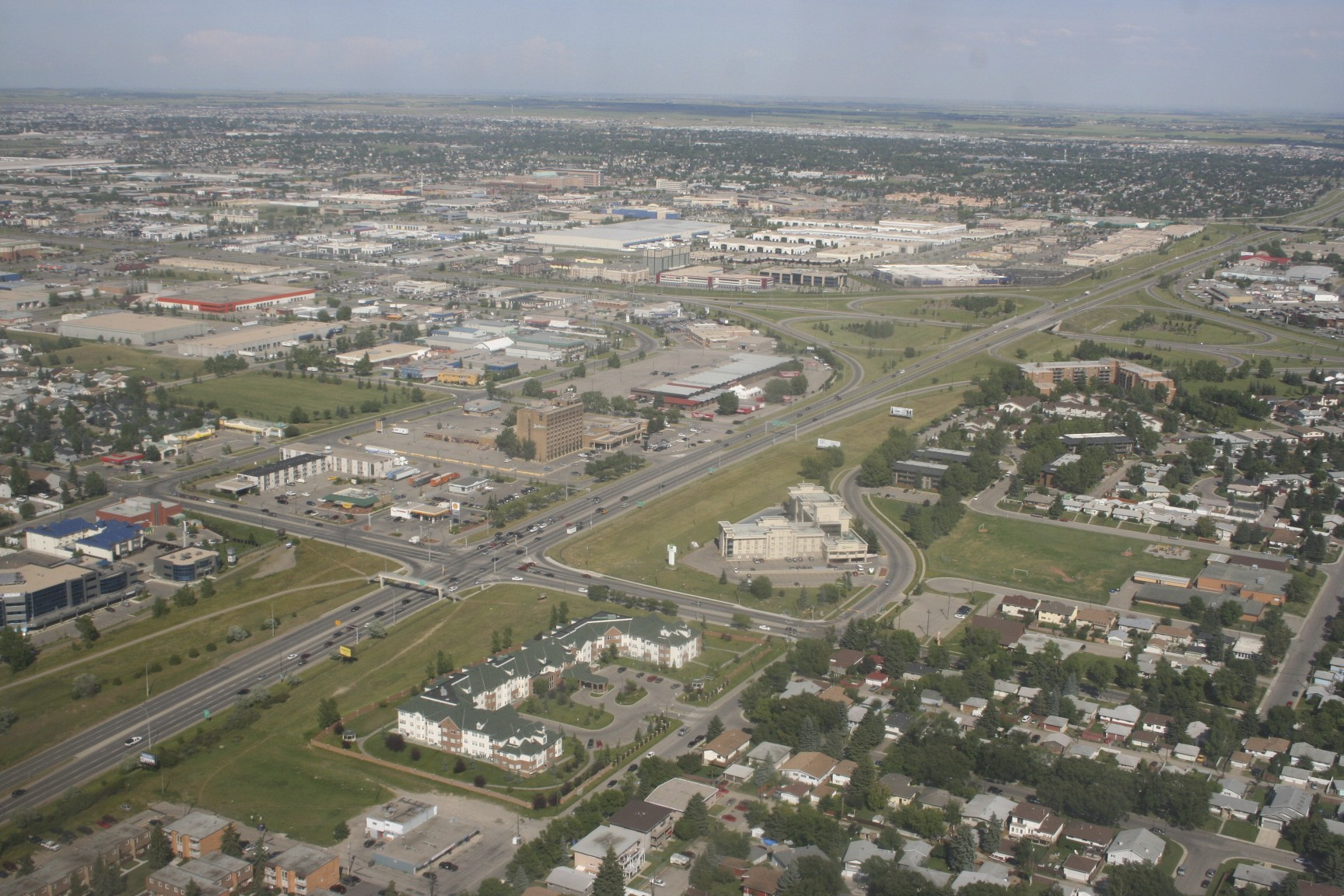
Looking east along 16 Avenue in northeast Calgary

At Centre Street, 16 Avenue NE enters the northeast quadrant and continues east, and intersects Edmonton Trail before descending the Nose Creek valley and intersects Deerfoot Trail (Highway 2) through a split-diamond interchange before it leaves the valley and intersects 19 Street NE. East of 19 Street NE, it becomes a short freeway, beginning with a cloverleaf interchange at Barlow Trail; the area is formerly known as Crossroads since it used to be the former alignment of Highway 2 - while the neighbourhood has since been renamed to Mayland Heights, some of the areas businesses still utilized the Crossroads name. 16 Avenue continues east with interchanges at 36 Street NE and 52 Street NE before intersecting 68 Street NE. It again intersects Stoney Trail, where westbound signage recommends that traffic en route to Banff, Edmonton, and Lethbridge use Stoney Trail as a bypass, before leaving Calgary and heading east towards Chestermere, Medicine Hat, and the Saskatchewan border.

== History ==
Sixteenth Avenue North was part of the village of Crescent Heights until annexed by The City of Calgary in the early 1900s. An electric trolley ran down the artery connecting the area with downtown from 1911 to the mid-1900s. The electric trolley was slowly phased out and replaced with buses. In fact, Calgary's first park and ride was on the Tuxedo bus loop in 1956 and one of three trial express buses started on October 21, 1957—the Yellow Pennant Express from Capitol Hill.

In the 1950s, Highway 1 was rerouted from 17 Avenue SE and a series of streets through downtown Calgary to follow 16 Avenue N as part of the Trans-Canada Highway construction; however shortly afterwards the City of Calgary began to study alternate routes in an effort to relieve congestion. In 1970, the City of Calgary a proposed freeway that would run north of 16 Avenue N between 23 and 24 Avenue N, but the plans were cancelled. In the following years, different bypass options were studied in conjunction with plans for a Calgary ring road, including the possibility of the Trans-Canada Highway following Sarcee Trail (including an extension through the Tsuu T'ina Nation), Highway 22X, and Highway 901 before rejoining Highway 1 near Gleichen that was proposed by Alberta Transportation in 1989; this plan was rejected as Calgary is considered a major destination city and was opposed by business owners along the 16 Avenue N. On November 2, 2009, the northeast section of Stoney Trail was opened, providing a 41 km (25 mi) bypass option for the Trans-Canada Highway around north Calgary.

The inner city section of 16 Avenue N was a four lane, undivided street. From 2002–2010, the City of Calgary widened it to a six lane urban boulevard between removing buildings along south side of 16 Avenue N between 10 Street NW and 6 Street NE.

After the projected completion of the Bowfort Road interchange in summer 2017, 16 Avenue NW became a freeway west of Sarcee Trail to its western terminus.

== Future ==
The City of Calgary considers 16 Avenue N as part of the skeletal road network, however the sections through Montgomery (between the Bow River and Bowness Road) and between Banff Trail and Deerfoot Trail as Main Streets - streets that would be mixed use residential and commercial corridors. The City of Calgary have long-term plans in converting 16 Avenue N to a freeway in the outlying areas, which includes converting the Deerfoot Trail interchange into a three-level diamond interchange, and interchanges at 19 Street NE and 68 Street NE.

== Major intersections ==
From west to east. The entire route is in Calgary.

km	mi	Exit	Destinations	Notes
0.0	0.0		Highway 1 west (Trans-Canada Highway) – Canmore, Banff	City limits; continuation west of Calgary
1.9	1.2	176	Valley Ridge Boulevard / Crestmont Boulevard	Partial cloverleaf interchange with added ramps to and from Stoney Trail
3.1	1.9	177	Stoney Trail (Highway 201) – Edmonton, Medicine Hat, Lethbridge	Combination interchange; Highway 201 exit 36
4.7	2.9	179	Canada Olympic Drive / Bowfort Road	Single-point urban interchange to Canada Olympic Park
6.2	3.9		Sarcee Trail / 34 Avenue NW	Partial cloverleaf interchange
6.5	4.0		29 Avenue NW	Westbound right-in/right-out
7.1	4.4	Crosses the Bow River		
8.1	5.0		Home Road	At grade, traffic signals
9.4– 9.6	5.8– 6.0		Memorial Drive / Bowness Road / Shaganappi Trail	Interchange
10.0	6.2		West Campus Boulevard – Alberta Children's Hospital	Partial cloverleaf interchange
11.0	6.8		29 Street NW / Uxbridge Drive – Foothills Medical Centre	At grade, traffic signals
11.5– 11.8	7.1– 7.3		University Drive / Crowchild Trail to Highway 1A west	Interchange; no westbound exit to northbound Crowchild Trail; to McMahon Stadium and University of Calgary
12.2	7.6		Banff Trail	At grade, traffic signals; near Banff Trail station; eastbound access to northbound Crowchild Trail
12.6	7.8		19 Street NW	At grade, traffic signals; near Lions Park station
13.4	8.3		14 Street NW – Alberta University of the Arts, Jubilee Auditorium, City Centre	Diamond interchange, traffic signals; passes North Hill Centre; former Highway 1A east; east end of former Highway 1A concurrency (pre-1970s)
14.1	8.8		10 Street NW	At grade, traffic signals
15.0	9.3		4 Street NW	At grade, traffic signals
15.7	9.8		Centre Street N	At grade, traffic signals; to City Centre
16.1	10.0		Edmonton Trail	At grade, traffic signals
18.1	11.2		Deerfoot Trail (Highway 2) – Red Deer, Fort Macleod	Split diamond interchange, traffic signals; Highway 2 exit 225; to Calgary International Airport
19.1	11.9		19 Street NE	At grade, traffic signals
19.9	12.4		Barlow Trail	Cloverleaf interchange
21.3	13.2		36 Street NE	Partial cloverleaf interchange; eastbound access to Sunridge Way; to Peter Lougheed Centre
22.9	14.2		52 Street NE	Partial cloverleaf interchange
24.6	15.3		68 Street NE	At grade, traffic signals; no southbound access from Stoney Trail
25.6	15.9		Stoney Trail (Highway 201) – Edmonton, Lethbridge, Banff	Combination interchange; Highway 201 exit 78
26.5	16.5		Highway 1 east (Trans-Canada Highway) – Medicine Hat	City limits; continuation east of Calgary
1.000 mi = 1.609 km; 1.000 km = 0.621 mi: Incomplete access

== See also ==
- Transportation in Calgary
