= Banff Trail, Calgary =

Banff Trail West Capitol Hill
- Neighbourhood
- Location of Banff Trail in Calgary
- Coordinates: 51°04′31″N 114°06′46″W
- Country: Canada
- Province: Alberta
- City: Calgary
- Quadrant: NW
- Ward: 7
- Established: 1952
- Annexed: 1910

Government
  - Mayor: Jeromy Farkas
  - Administrative body: Calgary City Council
  - Councillor: Myke Atkinson (Independent)

Area
  - Total: 2.3 km^{2} (0.89 sq mi)
- Elevation: 1,105 m (3,625 ft)

Population (2006)
  - Total: 3,639
  - Average Income: $49,996
- Website: Banff Trail Community Association

Banff Trail is a residential neighbourhood in the northwest quadrant of Calgary, Alberta. It is located northeast of the intersection of Crowchild Trail and Trans-Canada Highway, east of McMahon Stadium and the University of Calgary. The Banff Trail station of the CTrain LRT system serves the community, which contains a large motel village in the southwest corner.

== History ==
Banff Trail was established in 1952 during the Mid-20th-century baby boom, in which Calgary saw a population explosion, and an increase in suburban growth. It was originally called West Capitol Hill.

West Capitol Hill was renamed to Banff Trail at an unknown time around the 1970s/1980s. This was in part due to Crowchild Trail formerly being named as Banff Trail, as it would take you to the popular tourist town of Banff, Alberta if continued outside of Calgary. The renaming of the community was to try to give it a more distinct character from the Capitol Hill neighborhood to the east of it.

== Demographics ==
In the City of Calgary's 2012 municipal census, Banff Trail had a population of 3,837 living in 1,950 dwellings, a 7.1% increase from its 2011 population of 3,582. With a land area of 1.5 km^{2} (0.58 sq mi), it had a population density of 2,560/km^{2} (6,630/sq mi) in 2012.

Residents in this community had a median household income of $49,996 in 2000, and there were 25.8% low income residents living in the neighbourhood. As of 2000, 15.3% of the residents were immigrants. A proportion of 35.8% of the buildings were condominiums or apartments, and 46.4% of the housing was used for renting.

Pop. Overtime
Year	Population
2014	4,204
2015	4,335
2016	4,189
2017	4,092
2018	4,165
2019	4,153
2021	3,805

== Crime ==
Crime Data
Year	Crime Rate (/100)
2018	4.2
2019	5.3
2020	6.0
2021	6.8
2022	6.9
2023	4.3

== Education ==
The community is served by Branton Bilingual Junior High School and William Aberhart Bilingual Senior High public schools. The University of Calgary grounds border the community to the west, and the Southern Alberta Institute of Technology to the south.

== See also ==
- List of neighbourhoods in Calgary
