= Confederation Park, Calgary =

Urban park in Calgary, Alberta, Canada

Confederation Park
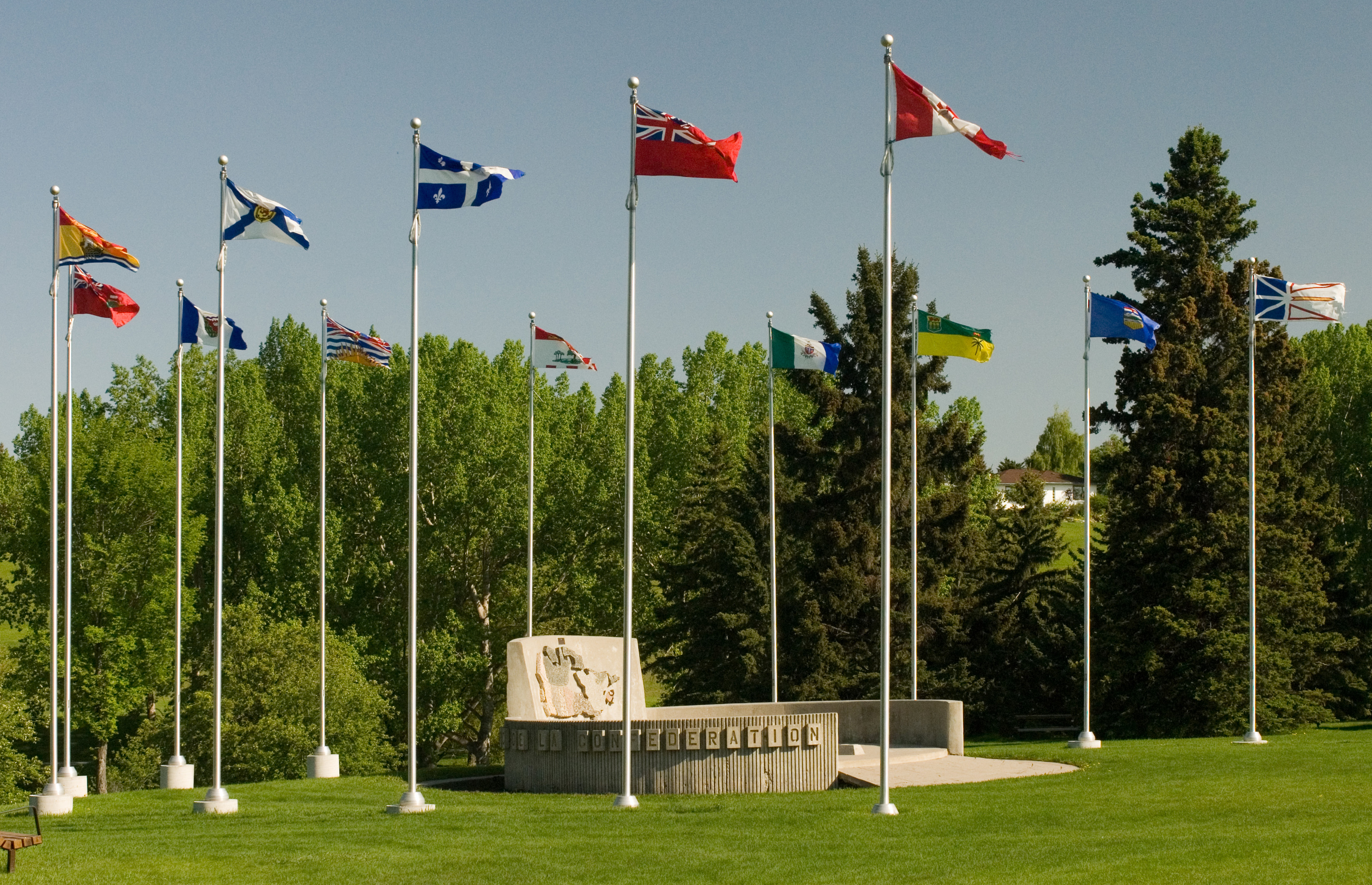
- Confederation Park
- Interactive map of Confederation Park
- Location: Calgary
- Coordinates: 51.07409°N 114.08770°W
- Area: 160 ha (400 acres)
- Operator: City of Calgary

Confederation Park is an urban park in northwest Calgary, Alberta.

It is developed over an area of 160 hectares (400 acres) between the neighbourhoods of Mount Pleasant, Capitol Hill, Collingwood and Highland Park. 10th Street West bisects the park from north to south. The City of Calgary's Confederation Park Page provides maps of the North Area and the South Area of the park.

Location of Confederation Park in Calgary

The park has picnic tables, toboggan hills, cycle paths, tennis courts and baseball diamonds. The park is also a popular destination for couples having wedding pictures taken. The park adjoins the Queens Park Cemetery on the east side by the baseball diamond and tennis courts near Highland Park. There is cross-country skiing both in the park and at the golf course during the winter. Any time of the year the park can be used for geocache searches.

Adjacent to the park is the Confederation Golf Course. In winter the golf course is open for cross-country skiing and the park hosts the Lions Club Christmas Light Display in December and January.

The park, anchored by the Centennial Golf Course to the west and Queen Park Cemetery to the east, along with other nearby open areas, affords neighborhoods such as Rosemont and Cambrian Heights large amounts of open space.

== History ==
In the mid-1960s, efforts to conserve the North Hill Coulee, a brook which remained undeveloped because of uneven terrain, were organized in the form of the Centennial Ravine Park Society. In 1967, the park opened to celebrate the centennial of the Canadian Confederation. The society was very active in the neighborhoods of Northwest Calgary, and raised funds to create the park space.

== Environment ==
Because the park follows the course of the North Hill Coulee, there is a riparian habitat, which supports an assortment of plants such as Douglas fir, dogwood and willows, despite the urbanized surrounding area. It is also an important migratory spot for several species of waterfowl.
