= Banff Trail station =

Light rail station in Calgary, Alberta, Canada

Banff Trail
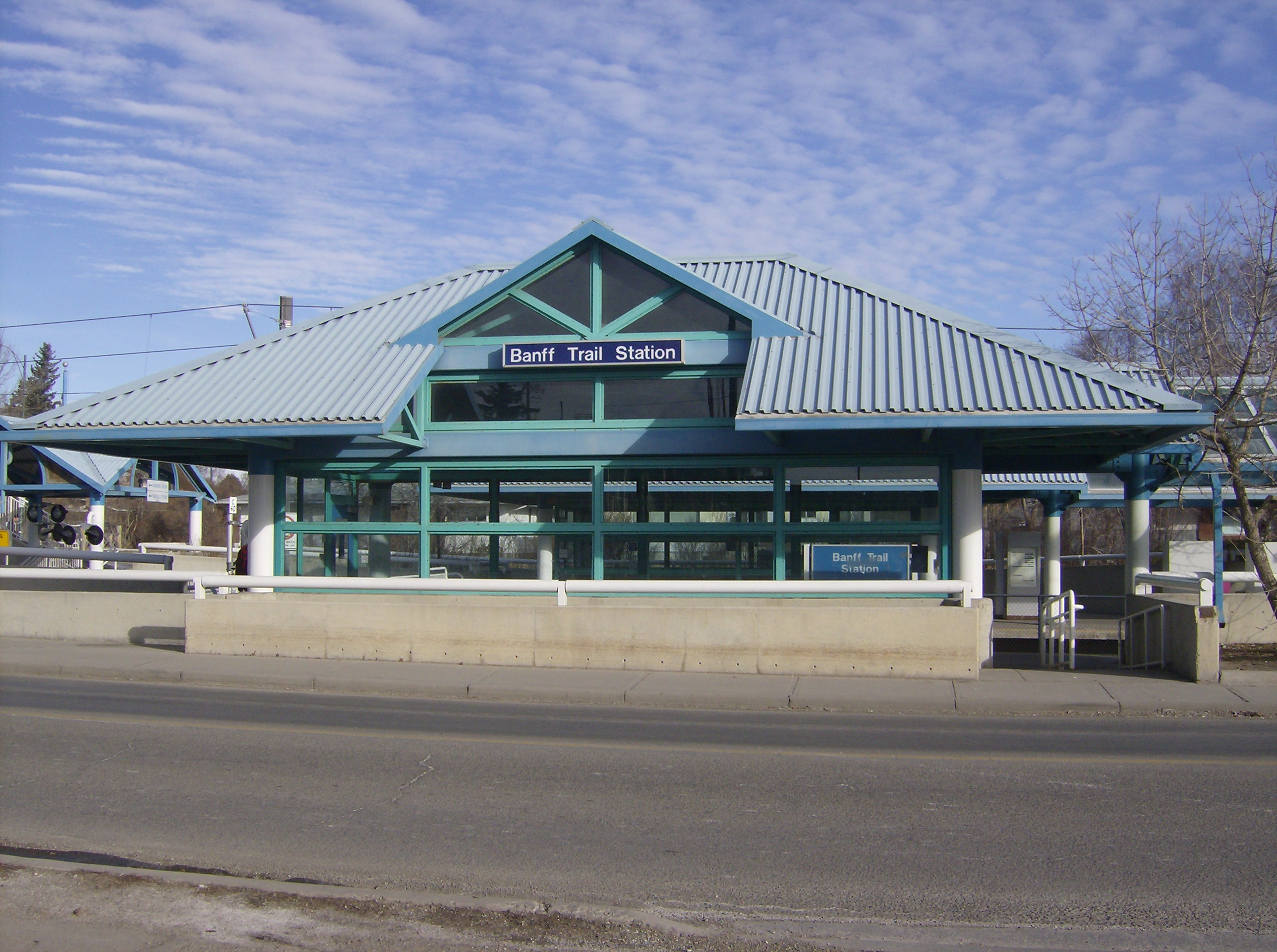

General information
- Location: 2374C Banff Trail NW
- Coordinates: 51°04′15.4″N 114°06′56″W
- Owner: Calgary Transit
- Platforms: Side-loading platforms
- Connections: No connections to bus routes

Construction
- Structure type: At-grade
- Parking: 700 spaces (at McMahon Stadium)
- Accessible: yes

History
- Opened: 1987; 39 years ago
- Rebuilt: 2014; 12 years ago

Services
Preceding station	Calgary Transit	Following station
University toward Tuscany	Red Line	Lions Park toward Somerset–Bridlewood
Location

Banff Trail station is a CTrain light rail station in Banff Trail, Calgary, Alberta, Canada. It serves the Red Line (Route 201) and opened on September 7, 1987, as part of the original line. It is located on the exclusive LRT right of way on the east side of Banff Trail NW, 4.1 km (2.5 mi) northwest of the 7 Avenue & 9 Street SW interlocking. The station consists of two side-loading platforms with grade-level access from a pedestrian crossing of the tracks at the northern end of the station.

== Location ==
The station is also located east of McMahon Stadium (which features 780 spaces available for commuters), and the Motel Village district, and north-east of the junction of Crowchild Trail and the Trans-Canada Highway.

== History ==
As part of Calgary Transit's plan to operate four-car CTrains by the end of 2014, all three-car platforms were to be extended. However, Banff Trail Station was also refurbished in addition to a platform extension. Construction began in early 2014 and continued into Winter 2014–2015. This refurbishment required an extended closure of the station.

The overhaul was completed December 21, 2014. It features new LED lighting, 16 HD security cameras, heated shelters and a much more user friendly, safer contemporary feel.

In 2008, Banff Trail Station registered 5,600 weekday boardings.

== Buses ==
Banff Trail Station does not have any direct bus connections. The nearest bus stop with service is about 500 meters to the south at the 16th Avenue/Banff Trail intersection, serving these routes:

- 19 - 16 Avenue N
- 40 - Crowfoot Station/North Hill
- 91 - Foothills Medical Centre/Lions Park.
