= Hounsfield Heights/Briar Hill =

- Neighbourhood
- Location of Hounsfield Heights/Briar Hill in Calgary
- Coordinates: 51°03′54″N 114°06′12″W
- Country: Canada
- Province: Alberta
- City: Calgary
- Quadrant: NW
- Ward: 7
- Established: 1953
- Annexed: 1906

Government
  - Mayor: Jeromy Farkas
  - Administrative body: Calgary City Council
  - Councillor: Myke Atkinson (Independent)

Area
  - Total: 1.3 km^{2} (0.50 sq mi)
- Elevation: 1,090 m (3,580 ft)

Population (2006)
  - Total: 2,903
  - Average Income: $59,502
- Website: Hounsfield Heights/Briar Hill Community Association

Hounsfield Heights/Briar Hill is an inner suburban neighbourhood in northwest Calgary, Alberta, Canada. Located north of the Hillhurst and West Hillhurst communities, the boundaries of the district are 16th Avenue N (Trans-Canada Highway)to the north; 14th Street W to the east; Lane north of 7th Avenue N to 19th Street W and 8th Avenue N to the south; and Crowchild Trail, 12th Avenue N, Juniper Road, and 22nd Street W to the west. Lions Park C-Train station and North Hill Centre are located within the community. In the early 90s, a gas station located in the North Hill Centre parking lot was found to have been leaking fuel, contaminating the soil and groundwater in Hounsfield Heights with benzene and 1,2-Dichloroethane. The community is built on an escarpment and is popular for its views of downtown to the south and the Rocky Mountains to the west.

The area has a rich history. It was once part of the Riley family homestead. Thomas Riley and his wife Georgina Hounsfield Riley and their children settled there in 1888. Their home, Hounsfield Lodge, was situated on the present site of the Bethany Care Centre.

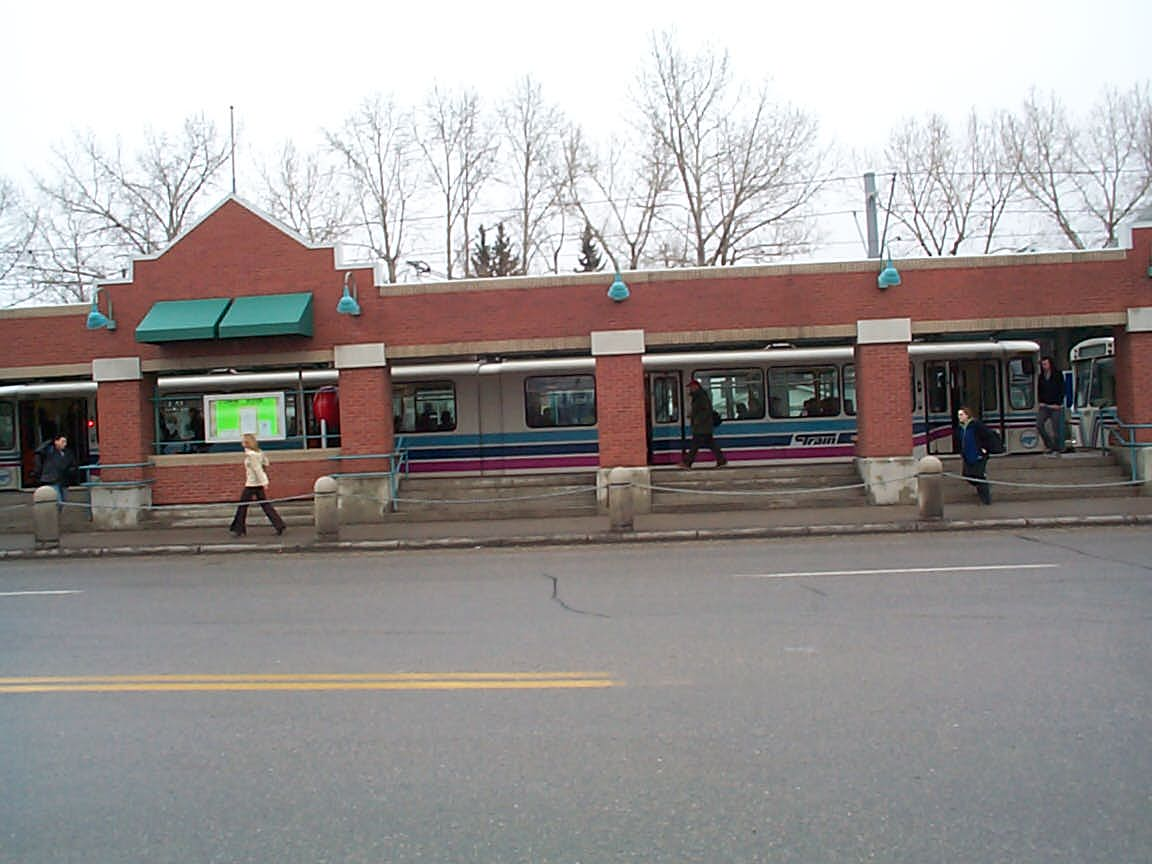
Lions Park C-Train station

The community was annexed by the city of Calgary in 1906, and it was established as a neighbourhood in 1953.

== Demographics ==
In the City of Calgary's 2012 municipal census, Hounsfield Heights/Briar Hill had a population of 2,954 living in 1,109 dwellings, a 0.9% increase from its 2011 population of 2,927. With a land area of 1.2 km^{2} (0.46 sq mi), it had a population density of 2,460/km^{2} (6,380/sq mi) in 2012.

Residents in this community had a median household income of $59,502 in 2000, and there were 7.8% low income residents living in the neighbourhood. As of 2000, 15.1% of the residents were immigrants. A proportion of 21.5% of the buildings were condominiums or apartments, and 21.6% of the housing was used for renting.

Pop. Overtime
Year	Population
2014	2,921
2015	2,972
2016	2,972
2017	3,016
2018	2,971
2019	2,798
2021	2,470

== Crime ==
Crime Data
Year	Crime Rate (/100)
2018	5.8
2019	7.2
2020	6.8
2021	7.9
2022	8.1
2023	5.9

== Education ==
In 2006, there was one school in the district:

- Briar Hill Elementary School - Public

== Sears Plume ==
In the early 90s, a gas station located in the parking lot of North Hill Centre and operated by Sears Canada was found to have been leaking fuel into the soil and contaminating the nearby groundwater. The leak occurred for at least two decades, leading to a large underground plume of gasoline. Because of this, it was necessary to create several monitoring sites and extraction wells in the east side of Hounsfield Heights. As of 2020, the sites consist of 127 groundwater monitoring wells, 7 extraction wells, and various meters installed in residential homes. Preliminary analyses of contamination levels indicate that benzene and 1,2-DCA concentrations will decay to acceptable levels within 15 years.

== See also ==
- List of neighbourhoods in Calgary
