= SAIT/AUArts/Jubilee station =

Light rail station in Calgary, Alberta, Canada

SAIT/AUArts/Jubilee
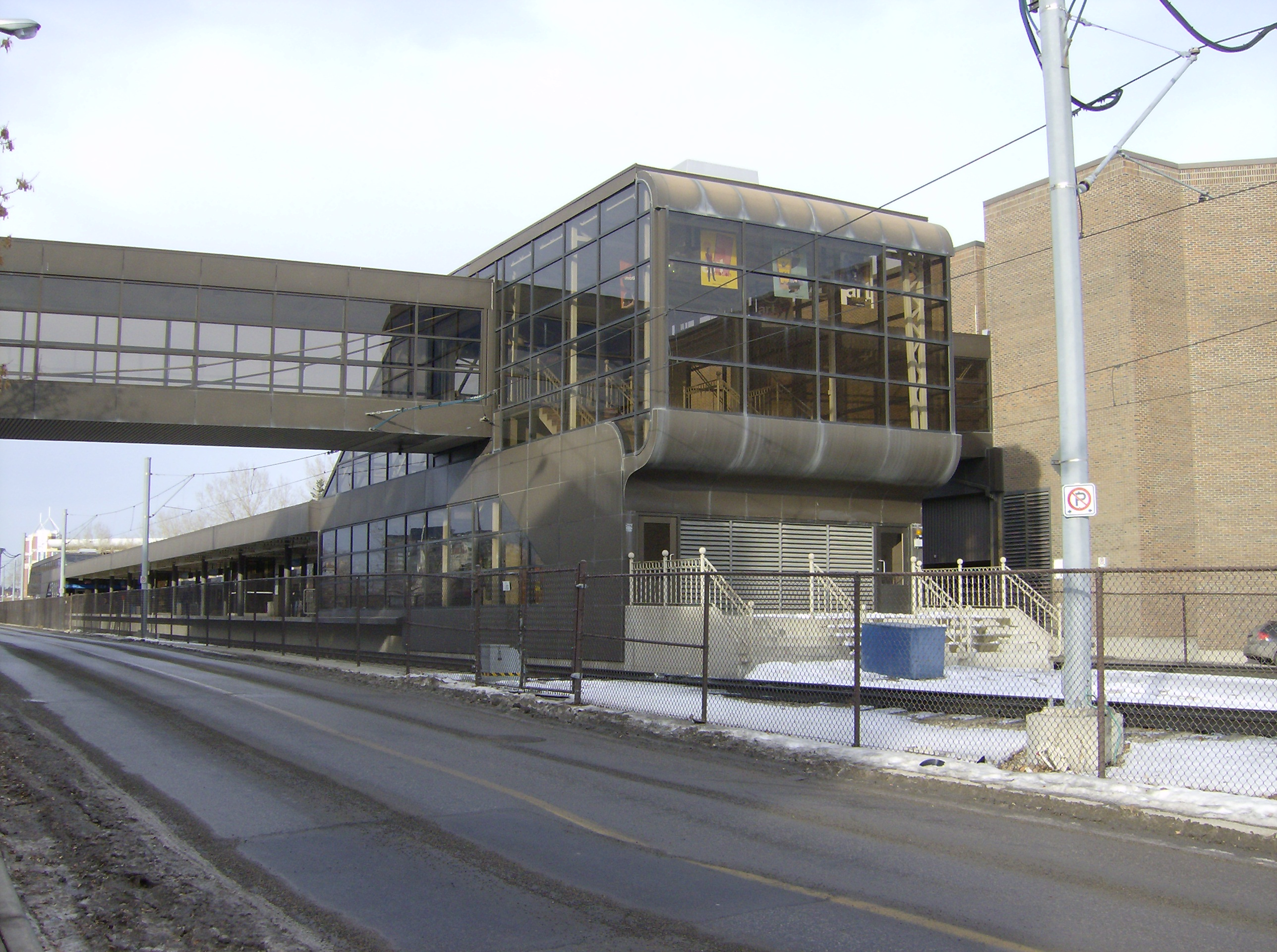

General information
- Other names: SAIT
- Coordinates: 51°03′46″N 114°05′27″W
- Transit authority: Calgary Transit
- Line: Red Line
- Platforms: Center-loading platform
- Connections: No connections to bus routes

Construction
- Structure type: At-grade
- Parking: None
- Accessible: yes

History
- Opened: 1987; 39 years ago
- Rebuilt: 2014; 12 years ago (minor)
- Former names: SAIT/ACAD/Jubilee SAIT/ACAD/Jubilee

Services
Preceding station	Calgary Transit	Following station
Lions Park toward Tuscany	Red Line	Sunnyside toward Somerset–Bridlewood
Location

SAIT/AUArts/Jubilee station, is a light rail station on the CTrain network of Calgary, Alberta. It serves the Northwest leg of the Red Line and opened on September 7, 1987, as part of the original line. The station is located on the exclusive LRT right of way in the heart of the Southern Alberta Institute of Technology (SAIT) campus, 1.8 km (1.1 mi) northwest of the 7 Avenue & 9 Street SW.

== Facilities ==
The station possesses a center-loading platform which has grade-level access at the West end and +15 access at the East end connecting to both SAIT and the Alberta University of the Arts (AUArts). Due to construction at the SAIT campus, the only access to the SAIT campus is via the grade-level crossing at the west end. Stairs, an elevator and an escalator connect the platform to the +15. The station's full name is Southern Alberta Institute of Technology/Alberta University of the Arts/Southern Alberta Jubilee Auditorium. The station serves all of the aforementioned landmarks, and is also located close to the northern periphery of Riley Park.

== History ==
=== Name changes ===
When the station opened, the signage read "SAIT/ACA/Jubilee", as the station was constructed eight years before the Alberta College of Art changed its name to Alberta College of Art and Design. The signage was changed to "SAIT/AUArts/Jubilee" in mid-2019 due to the name change of Alberta College of Art and Design to the Alberta University of the Arts, although some trains continued to announce "SAIT/ACAD/Jubilee", especially the older Siemens-Duewag U2s.

=== Station upgrades ===
As part of Calgary Transit's plan to operate four-car trains by the end of 2014, all three-car platforms were to be extended. Construction of the extension for the then called SAIT/ACAD/Jubilee station started July 3, 2014 and was completed by the end of 2014.

Calgary Transit, in collaboration with Shaw Communications, announced on November 16, 2016 that 8 new locations for Public Wi-Fi services would be added to the Calgary C-Train system. These new locations would add public Wi-Fi to 18 new stations; including SAIT/AUArts/Jubilee Station. These changes were done as they would improve transit experience for their users, which would improve customer commitment.

== Buses ==
There are no direct bus connections to SAIT/AUArts/Jubilee Station. The nearest bus stop with service is about 150 meters to the west on the off-ramp from 14th Street onto 14th Avenue/General Motors Drive. This stop serves the following routes:

- 19 - Dalhousie/Sunridge
- 40 - North Hill
- 65 - Market Mall/Downtown West
- 91 - Lions Park
- 105 - Dalhousie
- 404 - North Hill
- 414 - 14 Street W

The Max Orange stop is located at the north end of the SAIT campus, about 500 meters north of the LRT station.
