= Lions Park station =

Light rail station in Calgary, Alberta, Canada

Lions Park
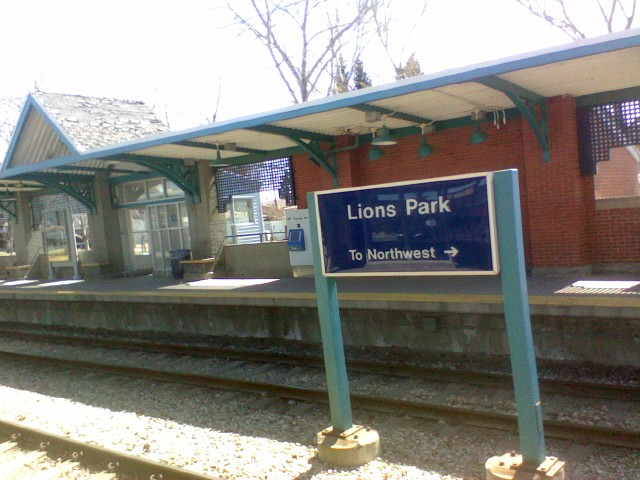

General information
- Location: 1901C - 14 Avenue NW
- Coordinates: 51°03′54″N 114°06′12″W
- Owner: Calgary Transit
- Platforms: Side-loading platforms
- Connections: 19 16th Avenue North; 40 Crowfoot; 91 Foothills Medical Centre; 105 Dalhousie; 404 North Hill; 414 14th Street Crosstown; Max Orange Brentwood/Saddletowne

Construction
- Structure type: At-grade
- Parking: None
- Accessible: yes

History
- Opened: 1987; 39 years ago
- Rebuilt: 2013; 13 years ago

Services
Preceding station	Calgary Transit	Following station
Banff Trail toward Tuscany	Red Line	SAIT/AUArts/Jubilee toward Somerset–Bridlewood
Location

Lions Park Station is a Calgary C-Train light rail station in Hounsfield Heights-Briar Hill, Calgary, Alberta, Canada. Opened on September 7, 1987 as part of the original Northwest Line (Route 201). It is located on the exclusive LRT right of way on the south side of 14 Avenue NW, just east of 19 Street NW. Two side-loading platforms with ramp access from grade level as well as pedestrian crossings are located at both ends of the station. The station is located adjacent to the Mall Entrance 5 of the North Hill Centre shopping mall, and is less than 1 kilometre (0.62 miles) away from the campus of SAIT.

The station is located on the Northwest leg of the Red Line, sitting between SAIT/AUArts/Jubilee Station southbound, and Banff Trail Station northbound. The station acts as a transfer point of the MAX Orange BRT bus line, connecting with the North Hill stop.

In 2008, the station registered an average of 5,800 weekday boardings.

== Station upgrades ==
As part of Calgary Transit's plan to operate four-car trains by the end of 2014, all three-car platforms were to be extended. Lions Park Station had the platform extended to the East which also include an additional level crossing of the tracks, as well the pedestrian crossing of 14 Avenue NW was moved along with the platform. Construction started in Fall 2013 and finished in six months. This platform extension required no closures and didn't affect wheelchair ramp access.

Calgary Transit, in collaboration with Shaw Communications, announced on November 16, 2016 that 8 new locations for Public Wi-Fi services would be added to the Calgary C-Train system. These new locations would add public Wi-Fi to 18 new stations; including Lions Park Station. These changes ere done as they would improve transit experience for their users, which would improve customer commitment.

== Crime ==
On the Tuesday night of November 8, 2021, a man was taken to hospital after being stabbed at Lions Park LRT Station.

Police were called to the platform of the Lions Park LRT Station at roughly 8:00 PM on March 28, 2023 for reports of a stabbing. When police arrived, two women were found with stab wounds, one in life-threatening condition. An investigation following this found that a fight had taken place between several women on the platform, who were known by each other.

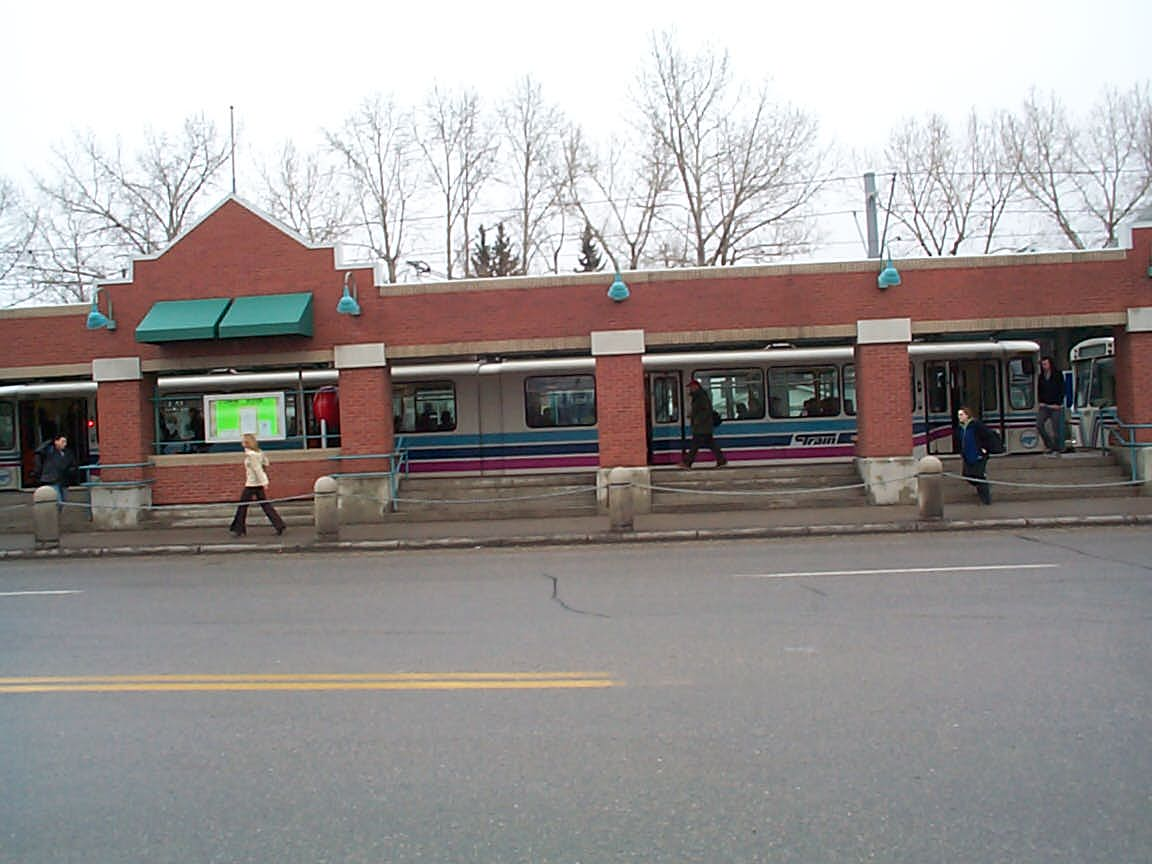
View of the station on 14 Ave NW

== Buses ==
The following routes terminate, originate, or stop at Lions Park Station:

- 19 - Dalhousie / 19 - Sunridge
- 40 - Crowfoot
- 89 - North Pointe
- 105 - Dalhousie
- 91 - Foothills Medical Centre
- 404 - North Hill / 404 - Mount Pleasant
- 414 - 14 Street N / 414 - 14 Street S

The MAX Orange route stops on the north side of the North Hill Centre Shopping Center, with access to Lions Park through the mall.

== See also ==
- CTrain
- Red Line (Calgary)
- Banff Trail station (Calgary)
- Sunnyside station (Calgary)
- North Hill Centre
- Hounsfield Heights/Briar Hill, Calgary
- Bonnie Doon station (Edmonton)
