= Capitol Hill, Calgary =

Capitol Hill
- Neighbourhood
- Location of Capitol Hill in Calgary
- Coordinates: 51°04′14″N 114°05′41″W
- Country: Canada
- Province: Alberta
- City: Calgary
- Quadrant: NW
- Ward: 7
- Established: 1948

Government
  - Mayor: Jeromy Farkas
  - Administrative body: Calgary City Council
  - Councillor: Myke Atkinson (Independent)
- Elevation: 1,090 m (3,580 ft)

Population (2006)
  - Total: 4,044
  - Average Income: $38,670
- Website: Capitol Hill Community

Capitol Hill is a residential neighbourhood in the northwest quadrant of Calgary, Alberta, Canada. It is located immediately north of the Trans-Canada Highway, and is bisected by 14th Street West. The Southern Alberta Institute of Technology and the North Hill shopping center are located south of the community. To the north it is bounded by the Confederation Park.

Capitol Hill was established in 1948, but contains buildings as old as 1910. Most of the community was built in the 1950s. It is represented in the Calgary City Council by the Ward 7 councillor.

== Demographics ==
In the City of Calgary's 2012 municipal census, Capitol Hill had a population of 4,015 living in 2,291 dwellings, a 0.3% increase from its 2011 population of 4,003. With a land area of 1.4 km^{2} (0.54 sq mi), it had a population density of 2,870/km^{2} (7,430/sq mi) in 2012.

Residents in this community had a median household income of $38,670 in 2000, and there were 25.8% low income residents living in the neighbourhood. As of 2000, 17.9% of the residents were immigrants. A proportion of 46.4% of the buildings were condominiums or apartments, and 59.8% of the housing was used for renting. Many students of close-by Southern Alberta Institute of Technology and University of Calgary reside here.

== Crime ==
Crime Data
Year	Crime Rate (/100 pop.)
2018	4.8
2019	4.9
2020	5.5
2021	4.7
2022	4.5
2023	3.4

== Education ==
The Capitol Hill Elementary public school and the St. Pius Bilingual Elementary School (a Catholic school) are located in the community.

== See also ==
- List of neighbourhoods in Calgary
