= Sunnyside station (Calgary) =

Light rail station in Calgary, Alberta, Canada

Sunnyside
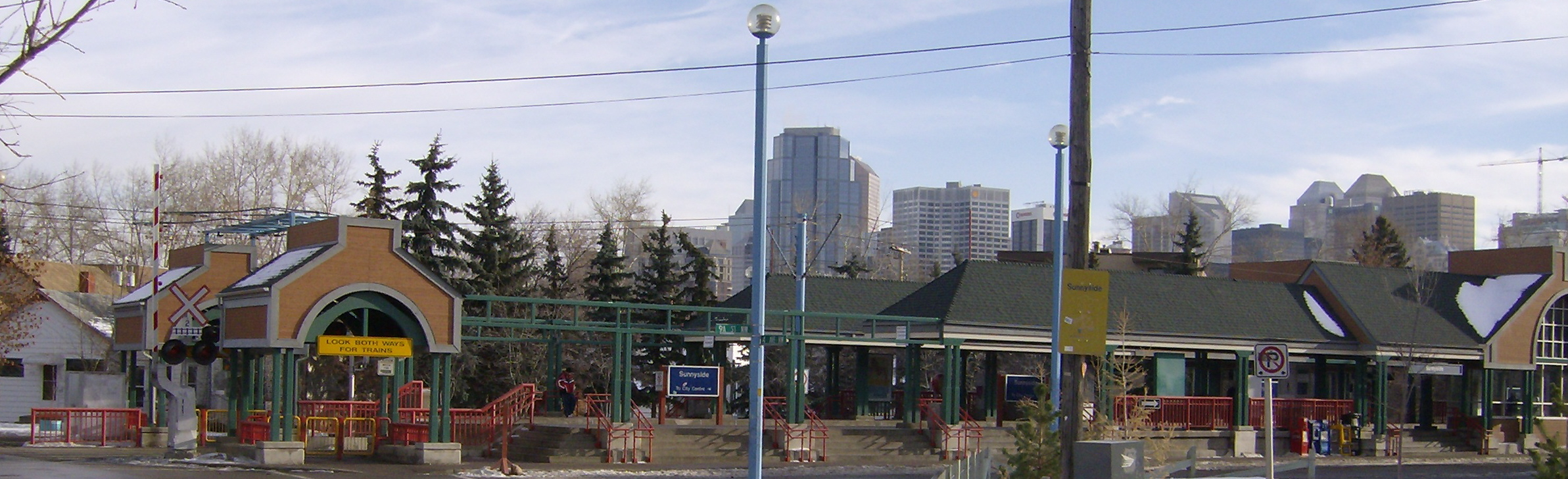

General information
- Location: 938C - 3 Avenue NW
- Coordinates: 51°03′21″N 114°05′04″W
- Owner: Calgary Transit
- Platforms: Side-loading platforms
- Connections: 4 Huntington; 5 North Haven; 104 University of Calgary/Sunnyside

Construction
- Structure type: At-grade
- Parking: None
- Accessible: yes

History
- Opened: 1987; 39 years ago
- Rebuilt: 2012; 14 years ago (platform extension)

Services
Preceding station	Calgary Transit	Following station
SAIT/AUArts/Jubilee toward Tuscany	Red Line	7 Street SW One-way operation
SAIT/AUArts/Jubilee toward Tuscany	Red Line	8 Street SW toward Somerset–Bridlewood
Location

Sunnyside Station is a light rail station on the CTrain system of Calgary, Alberta, located in the community of Sunnyside. It serves the Northwest leg of the Red Line, being the first station after the Free Fare Zone. It is located on the exclusive light rail right of way beside 9A Street NW at 4 Avenue NW, 0.9 km (0.56 mi) northwest of the 7 Avenue & 9 Street SW interlocking. The station opened on September 7, 1987, as part of the original Northwest line. The station consists of two side-loading platforms with pedestrian crossings at both ends.

== Station upgrades ==
As part of Calgary Transit's plan to operate four-car trains by the end of 2014, all three-car platforms were extended. On April 16, 2012, construction started on the extension of the platform to the South as well as redevelopment of the plaza areas immediately adjacent to the east side of the station. On November 24, 2012, the new platform extension and wheelchair ramps had been re-opened however, work continued on the station plaza area on the east side until early January 2013.

Calgary Transit, in collaboration with Shaw Communications, announced on November 16, 2016 that 8 new locations for Public Wi-Fi services would be added to the Calgary C-Train system. These new locations would add public Wi-Fi to 18 new stations; including Sunnyside Station. These changes ere done as they would improve transit experience for their users, which would improve customer commitment.

== History ==
When the Northwest Line was being planned, community residents organized to keep this station from being built as it required the demolition of many homes and the major disruption of 9A Street N.W. (a number of homes and apartment blocks which were not demolished were left with no front street access). The city pushed ahead with its plans by purchasing most of the properties along 9A Street. Eventually, as the area became accustomed to the CTrain, the properties were sold off to private interests.

== Ridership ==
The station registered an average of 5,700 daily boardings in 2005, which by 2008 had increased to an average of 10,400.

== Transit connections ==
Bus connections to Sunnyside station as of 31 August, 2026:

- 4 - Huntington
- 5 - North Haven
- 104 - University of Calgary
