= Valley Ridge, Calgary =

Valley Ridge
- Neighbourhood
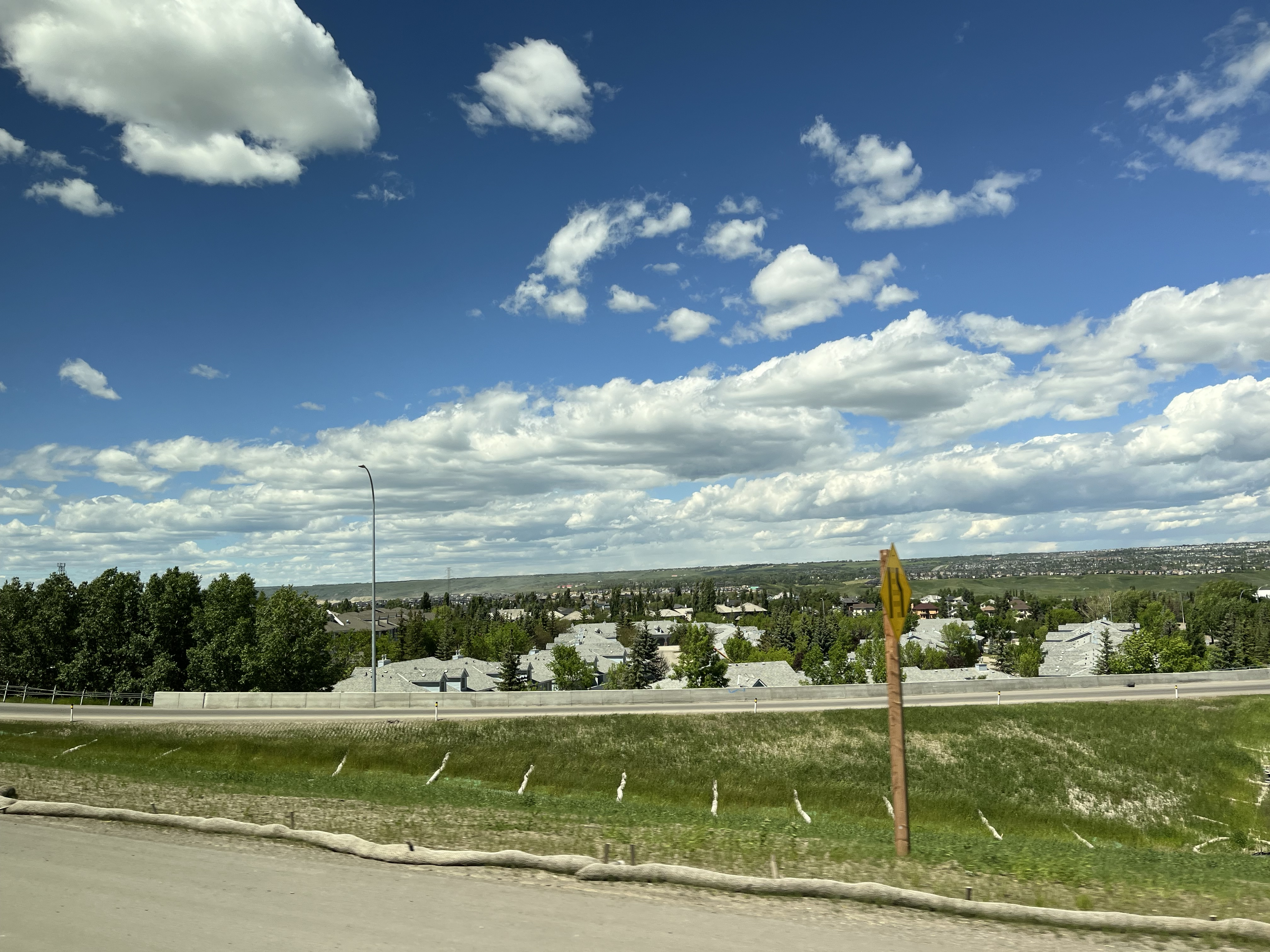

- Location of Valley Ridge in Calgary
- Coordinates: 51°05′31″N 114°14′58″W
- Country: Canada
- Province: Alberta
- City: Calgary
- Quadrant: NW
- Ward: 1
- Established: 1992

Government
  - Mayor: Jeromy Farkas
  - Administrative body: Calgary City Council
  - Councillor: Kim Tyers (Communities First)
- Elevation: 1,030 m (3,380 ft)

Population (2006)
  - Total: 4,575
  - Average Income: $104,947
- Area codes: +1-403, +1-587
- Website: Valley Ridge Community Association

Valley Ridge is a residential neighbourhood in the northwest quadrant of Calgary, Alberta, Canada. It is located at the western edge of the city, south of the Bow River and north of the Trans-Canada Highway. The Valley Ridge golf course is located in the northern part of the community. The community is located on the former site of the Happy Valley Campground, a park with slides, which was a destination for visitors to Calgary until it was closed in the 1980s; the campground was located where the golf course is now situated.

== Demographics ==
In the City of Calgary's 2012 municipal census, Valley Ridge had a population of 5,013 living in 1,768 dwellings, a -0.6% increase from its 2011 population of 5,042. With a land area of 3.3 km^{2} (1.3 sq mi), it had a population density of 1,519/km^{2} (3,930/sq mi) in 2012.

Residents in this community had a median household income of $144,800 in 2010, and there were 4.9% low income residents living in the neighbourhood. As of 2010, 17% of the residents were immigrants. Consisting mostly of single-family detached homes, only 1.4% of the housing is used for renting.

== See also ==
- List of neighbourhoods in Calgary
