= North Hill Centre =

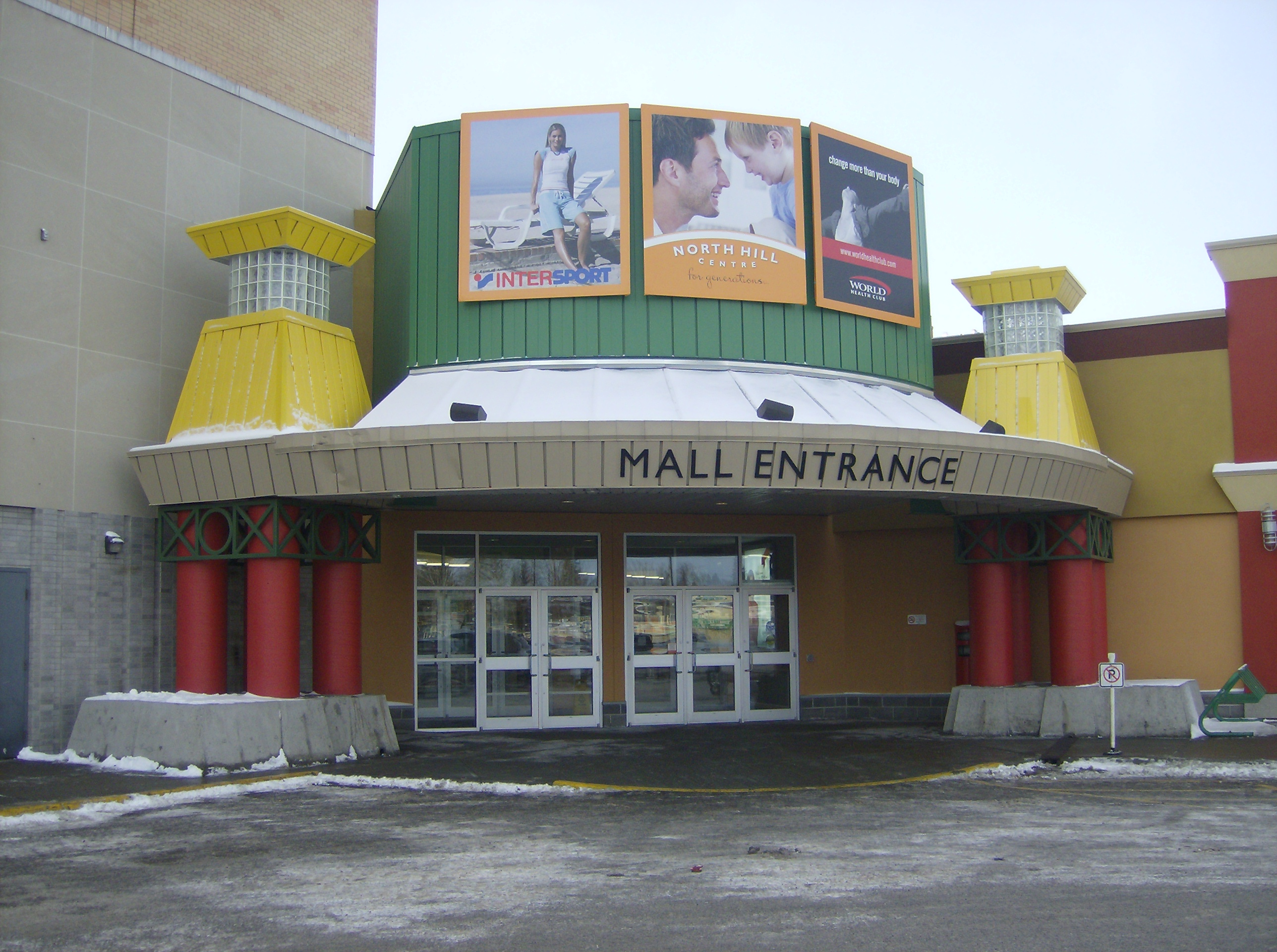
- One of the entrances to North Hill Centre (2007)
- Location: Calgary, Alberta, Canada
- Coordinates: 51°03′57″N 114°05′58″W
- Address: 1632 14 Avenue NW
- Opened: June 1958
- Manager: BentallGreenOak
- Num. of stores: 76
- Num. of anchor tenants: 1 (major)
- Floor area: 20,000 m^{2} (220,000 sq ft)
- Floors: 1
- Public transit: Lions Park station
- Website: northhillcentre.com

North Hill Centre is a shopping mall in Calgary, Alberta, Canada. It opened in 1958, and was Calgary's first shopping mall. The original anchor tenant was Simpsons-Sears (later Sears Canada), but it closed on January 8, 2018 and has since been replaced by Showhome Furniture.

== History ==
Location of North Hill Centre in Calgary

=== Opening ===
Stores began opening in the mall in June 1958, and the mall's official grand opening as the Calgary Centre was in October 1958. It was billed as the largest shopping centre in Western Canada, with about 30 stores and services. As described by mall spokeswoman Paula Newhold: "It was revolutionary to have a mall and to have late-night shopping and all of that kind of stuff that is just quite normal for us now. The real experience was that it was all in one place - that was the interesting thing."

The Fairview Bowling Alley was erected in the parking lot in 1967, replacing an alley that had previously operated in the mall's basement. North Hill Cinema opened above the bowling alley in 1967. Both remained in operation until 1999, when the structure was demolished as part of the mall's major 2000 renovation.

=== 1973 expansion ===
North Hill Centre was originally built as a strip mall accompanied by a freestanding Simpson-Sears department store. In 1973 the mall underwent a major renovation, which added 20 more stores and enclosed the shopping area. The design featured a central corridor with irregularly sized columns and ceiling heights, presenting an inconsistent look to the storefronts in the mall.

By the 1990s, anchor tenants for the mall were Sears and Canada Safeway (on the east end), along with Super Valu (on the west end), giving the mall two major grocery stores. Until the late 1990s, the mall also had a small Zellers location.

The North Hill Theatre and Fairview Bowling Alley, erected in the parking lot in 1967, remained in operation until 1999.

=== 2000s renovations ===
In 2000, the mall was renovated. The interior columns were removed, the mall ceiling was raised to a consistent height, and additional shops and services were added. A new food court was developed, and the Canada Safeway, previously located at the east end of the mall next to Sears, was relocated to the west end, replacing the by-now-defunct SuperValu grocery store and becoming the mall's west anchor. The renovations also involved demolishing the standalone movie theatre/bowling alley on the mall's north side to make room for more parking and building footprint expansion, which included the addition of several restaurants and other businesses with exterior-only access.

In 2004, The Renaissance, consisting of two eight-storey condominium towers, was built adjacent to the mall and above a new covered parking area. By the mid-2010s, the mall's easternmost parking lot area, often used by students from nearby Southern Alberta Institute of Technology, visitors to the Southern Alberta Jubilee Auditorium and users of the CTrain, became pay-only. The mall's western lots remained free parking.

The mall's Sears Canada location closed, along with the rest of the chain, in early 2018. As of 2023, a furniture store was operating out of the ground-floor level of the former Sears. In 2018-19 the mall added two junior anchor store tenants: Dollarama and Winners.

In 2025, the mall undertook an aggressive recruitment project, bringing in 'collector oriented' stores in order to draw from a wider area. Shops such as Gaming Lounge (retro video games), TFTOYS.CA (action figures and collectibles), Overtime Cards and Bento Gaming (sports and trading card games such as Pokemon) opened in 2025 to bring customers in from farther distances than the mall would otherwise attract and made it a destination stop for collectors.

== Sears Plume ==
In the early 90s, a gas station located in the parking lot and operated by Sears Canada was found to have been leaking into the soil, poisoning the groundwater. The leak occurred for at least two decades, leading to a large underground collection of gasoline. Because of this, it was necessary to create several monitoring sites in the nearby neighbourhood of Hounsfield Heights/Briar Hill. The monitoring sites consist of multiple wells and three meters installed in residential homes.
