= McMahon Stadium =

Football stadium in Calgary, Canada

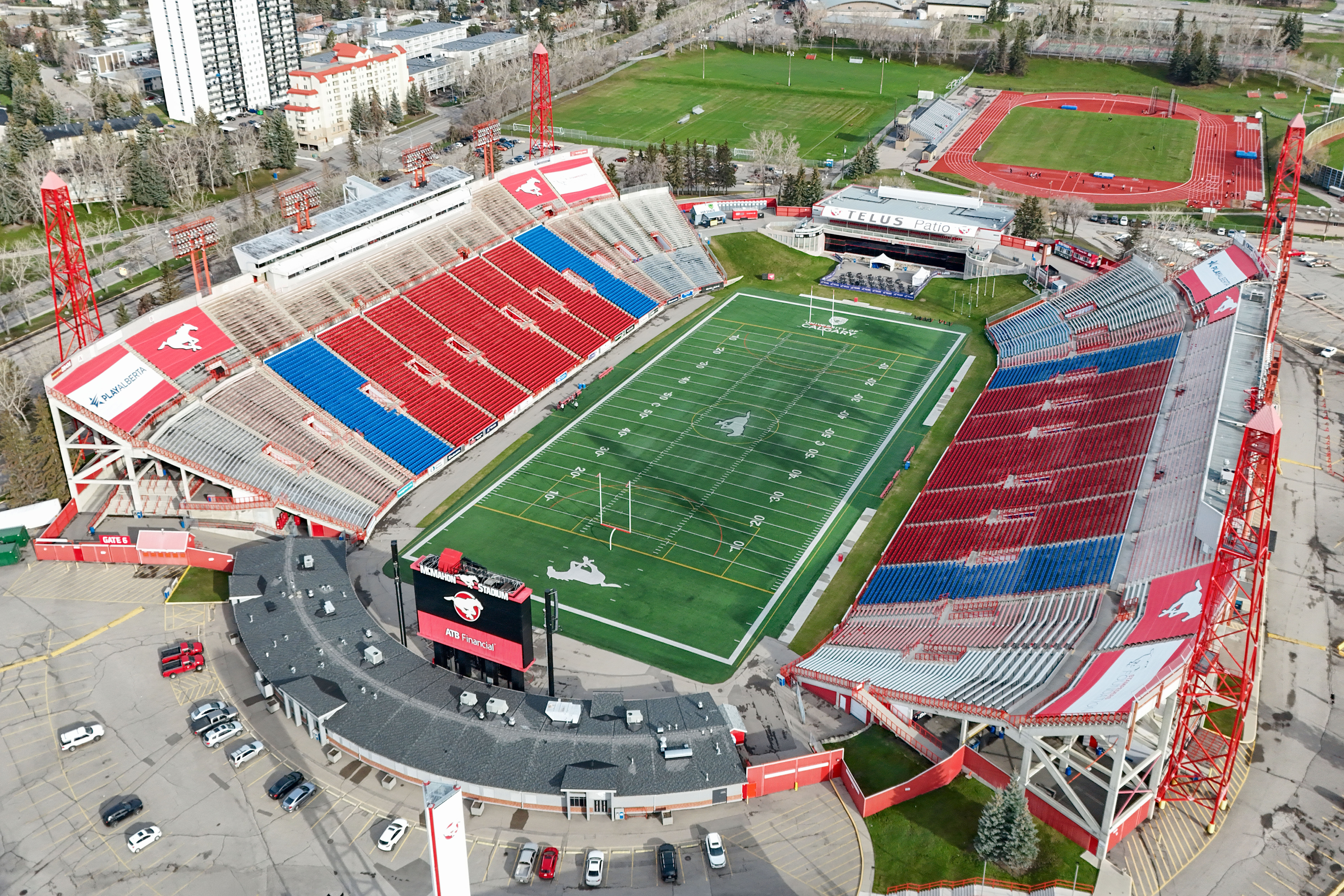
- Aerial view of the stadium in 2024

- Location in Calgary Location in Alberta Location in Canada
- Address: 1817 Crowchild Trail NW
- Location: Calgary, Alberta, Canada
- Coordinates: 51°4′13″N 114°7′17″W
- Owner: University of Calgary
- Operator: McMahon Stadium Society
- Capacity: Canadian football: 35,400 (46,020 with temporary seating)
- Surface: Grass (1960–1974); AstroTurf (1975–2005); FieldTurf (2006–present)
- Record attendance: 60,000 (1988 Winter Olympics)
- Public transit: Banff Trail station

Construction
- Groundbreaking: April 4, 1960
- Opened: August 15, 1960; 66 years ago (≈22,000)
- Renovated: 2001 (37,317); 2005 (35,650)
- Expanded: 1969 (≈25,000); 1973 (≈28,000); 1975 (32,454); 1988 (38,205)
- Cost: $1.05 million (1960 Canadian dollars) ($11.1 million in 2025 dollars)
- Architect: Rule Wynn and Rule

Tenants
- Calgary Stampeders (CFL) (1960–present); Calgary Dinos (U Sports) (1960–present); Calgary Colts (CJFL) (1967–present); Calgary Boomers (NASL) (1981); Calgary Wild FC (NSL) (2025–present)

Website
- godinos.com/mcmahon-stadium

McMahon Stadium (/məkˈmæn/ mək-MAN) is a Canadian football stadium in Calgary, Alberta, Canada. It is owned by the University of Calgary and operated by the McMahon Stadium Society.

The stadium is located between the downtown core and the University of Calgary, north of 16 Avenue NW between Crowchild Trail and University Drive. It is adjacent to the Banff Trail C-Train station.

It is the home venue for the University of Calgary Dinos, Calgary Colts of the Canadian Junior Football League, Calgary Gators and Calgary Wolfpack of the Alberta Football League, Calgary Wild FC of the Northern Super League, and the Calgary Stampeders of the Canadian Football League, who played at Mewata Stadium from 1935 to 1959. The stadium also was the open-air venue (as an ice rink) for the National Hockey League's 2011 Heritage Classic match between the Calgary Flames and the Montreal Canadiens.

The stadium was also the location of the 1988 Winter Olympics' opening and closing ceremonies, serving as the Olympic Stadium.

== History ==
From 1945 to 1960, the Calgary Stampeders and other athletic organizations operated out of Mewata Park Stadium, a 10,000-person facility, later expanded to 16,700, in the Downtown west end. An early proposal for a new stadium came in 1954 when the Stampeders proposed a new 20,000-person facility south of Victoria Park. The rush for a new stadium came with construction of a new bridge for 14 Street, which was believed to require land adjacent to Mewata Park Stadium. The Victoria Park stadium proposal had limited support from the Calgary Stampede and Exhibition board.

In February 1957, it was announced that a new stadium was planned near the University of Alberta (Calgary) with an estimated cost of $1 million. The planning sketches detailed a 20,000-person facility on an 32-hectare (80-acre) tract of land near the site of a 49-hectare (120-acre) tract of land set aside for the university. The initial plan sought financing through provincially or city issued bonds.

The city and province failed to back the stadium plan. On January 1, 1960, the team General Manager Jim Finks, play-by-play commentator Eric Bishop and Calgary Herald columnist Gorde Hunter approached the McMahon brothers to finance the stadium, which they agreed to. The stadium was designed by architect Peter Rule and constructed by Red Dutton's firm Burns and Dutton Concrete and Construction Company on the then University of Alberta (Calgary) campus using pre-cast concrete over 103 days with groundbreaking beginning on April 4, 1960, for a cost of $1.05 million. George McMahon and Dutton wagered $1,500 on whether the construction would finish on time, and when the project finished on time 103 days later, Dutton paid McMahon with one-dollar bills. The original stadium capacity was 19,536 and the university hoped that the structure could be expanded to 45,000 at some point in the future. McMahon stadium repurposed bleachers from Mewata Stadium around the end zone to provide seating for youth football program members, and the Mewata scoreboard was also relocated to the new stadium.

The University Board of Governors announced the stadium would be named after Calgary residents Frank McMahon and his brother, George McMahon, in August 1960. The McMahon brothers donated $300,000 to the university and the citizens of Calgary, and guaranteed the balance of money for the stadium's construction. Another name commonly considered was "Devil's Head Stadium" after Devils Head a mountain summit in Alberta. The stadium opened on August 15, 1960, with a Canadian Football League game seeing the Stampeders fall to the Winnipeg Blue Bombers 38–23. George McMahon kicked the ceremonial kickoff with a ball held by university president Walter H. Johns. Defensive Tackle Don Luzzi scored the first touchdown on a fumble recovery.

McMahon Stadium was expanded multiple times, first in 1967 with 2,600 seats for a capacity of 22,136, then in 1973 adding 3,500 seats to 25,636, and in 1975 with a $1.125-million expansion to 32,454 in time for the 63rd Grey Cup. Additional expansions occurred in 1978 at a cost of $4.5 million to 33,386, and in 1987 saw major expansion and upgrades at a cost of $17 million with 11,000 theatre-style seats added with capacity raised to 38,205. Skyboxes were added in 1993, lowering capacity to 37,211, with more skyboxes added in 2000 to lower capacity again to 35,967. Throughout the stadium's history temporary bleachers were employed for major events, including a record 60,000 at the opening and closing ceremonies for the 1988 Winter Olympics, and 50,000 for the 81st Grey Cup.

The university acquired complete ownership of the stadium and land in 1985 after the original financing was retired (1973) and a land exchange agreement was signed with the City of Calgary.

== McMahon Stadium Society ==
The stadium is operated by the McMahon Stadium Society. The society was incorporated as a non-profit society in Alberta in 1960 with its objectives to operate, improve and manage the stadium and its facilities, for sports, recreation and other useful purposes.

Its membership consists of: two persons appointed by the University of Calgary; from the City of Calgary, the Commissioner of Finance and the Commissioner of Planning and Community Services; and two other persons appointed by the four other members. The two other members were appointed by the McMahon brothers until the financing guaranteed by the McMahons was retired in 1973.

The society operates the stadium under two leases and a four-year, three-month agreement with the City of Calgary, approved on January 7, 2007.

== Seating ==
With permanent seating totalling 35,650, the stadium is the fifth-largest stadium in Canada. It was expanded in several stages from its original 22,000-seat capacity in 1960 to 38,205 in 1988.

More recent renovations in 2001 and 2005, in which luxury boxes replaced bleacher seating in the higher rows of the grandstands, reduced the capacity to 37,317 in 2001, and to its current 35,650 in 2005. In 2007, Calgary Stampeders president Ted Hellard proposed a further reduction of the stadium's capacity by approximately 4,200 seats to accommodate further luxury boxes, with renovations to be underwritten with personal seat licenses.

For special events such as Grey Cup games, temporary bleachers have been built in the facility's end zones. These seats accounted for a stadium attendance record 46,020 spectators at the 97th Grey Cup, between the Montreal Alouettes and Saskatchewan Roughriders on November 29, 2009.

== Field ==
The stadium features an infilled artificial FieldTurf field installed in 2006. Previously, the stadium installed its first AstroTurf artificial playing surface in 1975 amid concerns the original grass field (which was in place from the stadium's opening) would not withstand an intended increase in use of the stadium facilities by professional, amateur and recreational teams. The Field Turf has been replaced in 2014 and 2025.

== Notable events ==
=== Football ===
- The first football game took place at the stadium on August 15, 1960. The Winnipeg Blue Bombers beat the Calgary Stampeders 38–20.
- The CFL Grey Cup game was held at stadium in 1975, 1993, 2000, 2009, 2019 and 2026.
- The stadium hosted two CFL All-Star Games, in 1972 and 1978.

=== Hockey ===
It was the site of the 2011 NHL Heritage Classic regular season game between the Calgary Flames and Montreal Canadiens on February 20, 2011.

=== Olympics ===
The stadium was also used for the opening and closing ceremonies of the 1988 Winter Olympics, which required major expansion of its seating area.

=== Rugby ===
The stadium also has hosted international rugby union matches, including Canada defeating the United States 34-20 on August 22, 2025 in the 2025 World Rugby Pacific Nations Cup, in front of 11,587.

=== Concerts ===
- the Festival Express tour in 1970 - which featured the Grateful Dead, Janis Joplin, the New Riders of the Purple Sage, Delaney & Bonnie, Great Speckled Bird amongst others - the Lilith Fair tours in 1997, 1998 and 2010 and Ozzy Osbourne and the Monsters of Rock on July 26, 2008.
- On August 13, 2009, ZZ Top and Aerosmith were to perform at the venue, but an injury that occurred to Aerosmith's lead singer Steven Tyler led to the show's cancellation.

=== Other events ===
- The stadium hosted a Billy Graham Crusade in 1981.
- Queen Elizabeth II conducted an inspection of the Canadian Army at the stadium during her visit in 1990.
- Nitro Circus Live came to the stadium in 2017.
- Filming for the coin toss incident scene in Rat Race with Cuba Gooding Jr. took place before a Stampeders game September 4, 2000.

== Gallery ==
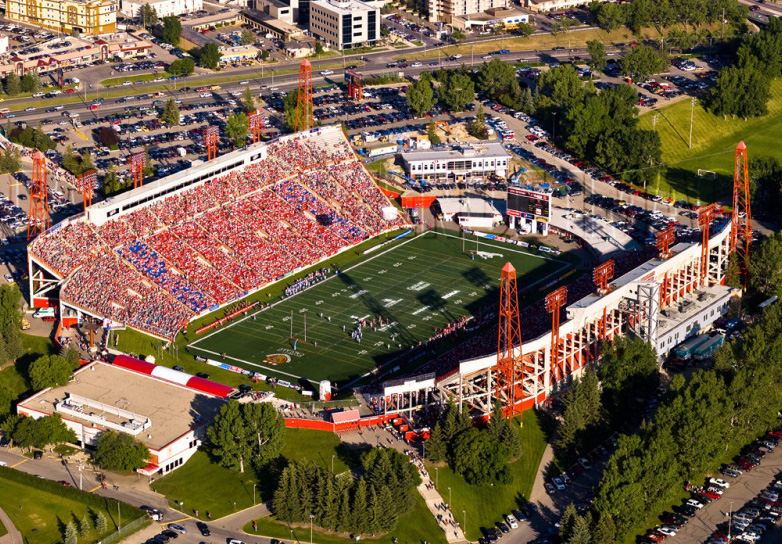
McMahon Stadium aerial photo during game action, 2009

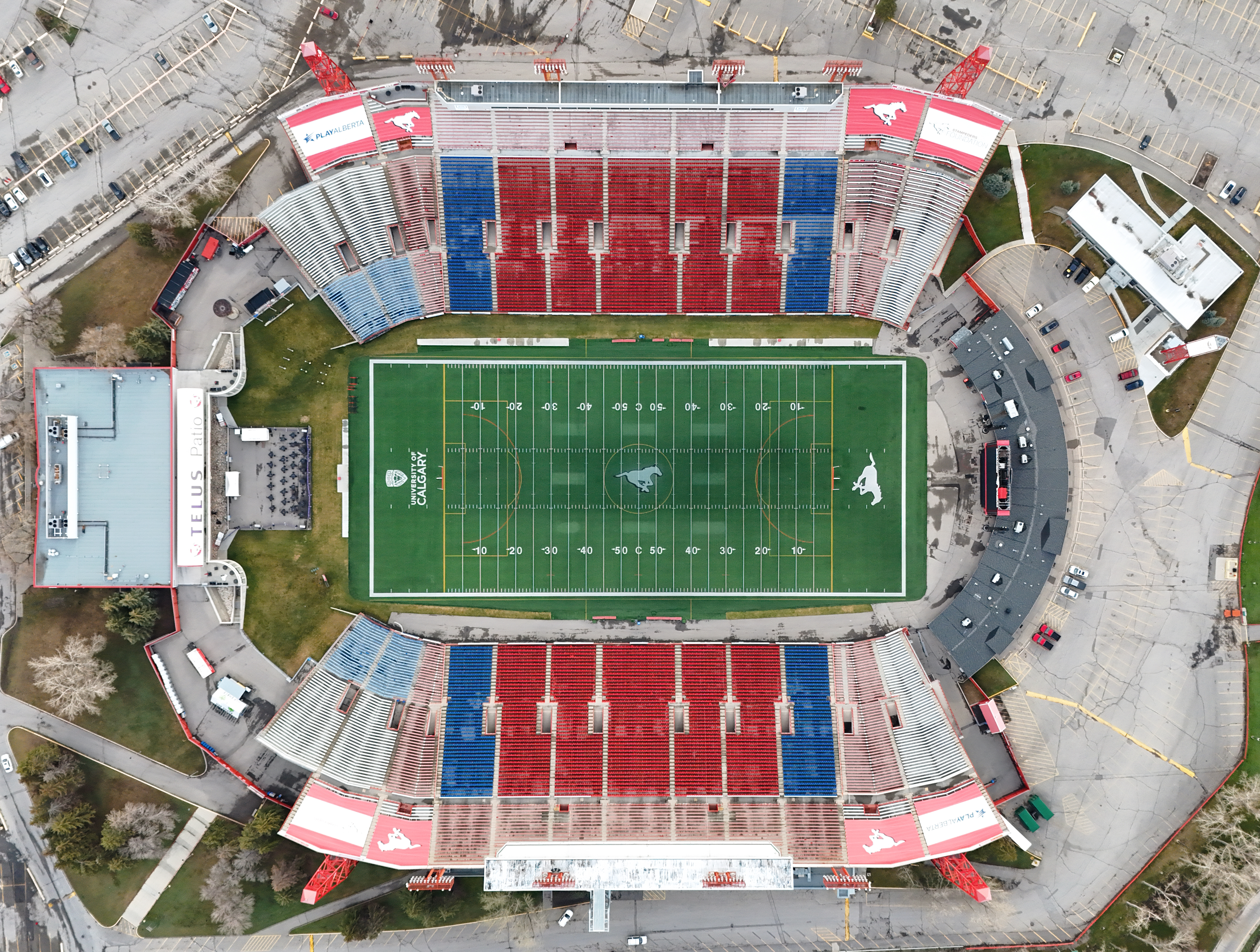
Overhead view

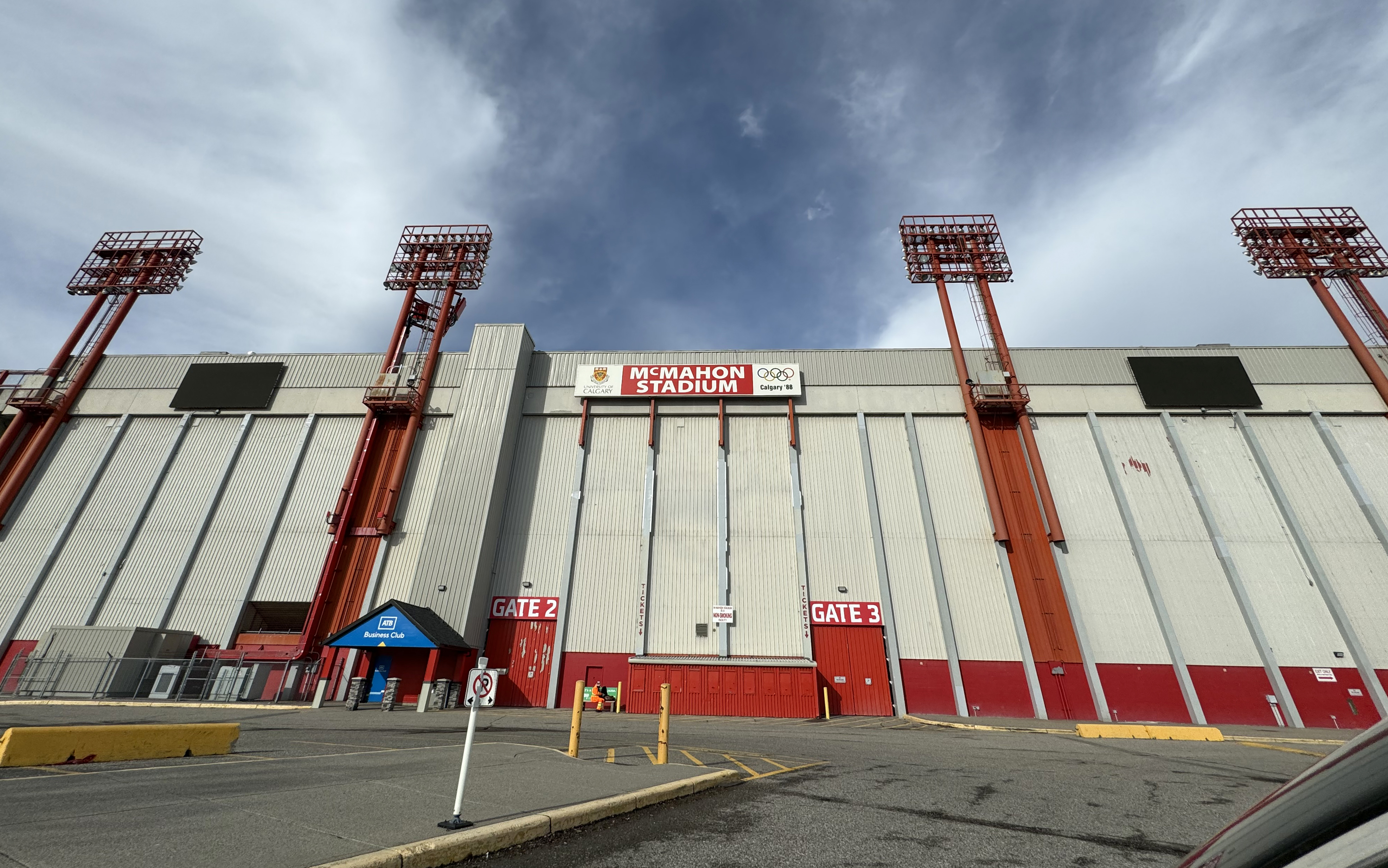
Stadium exterior

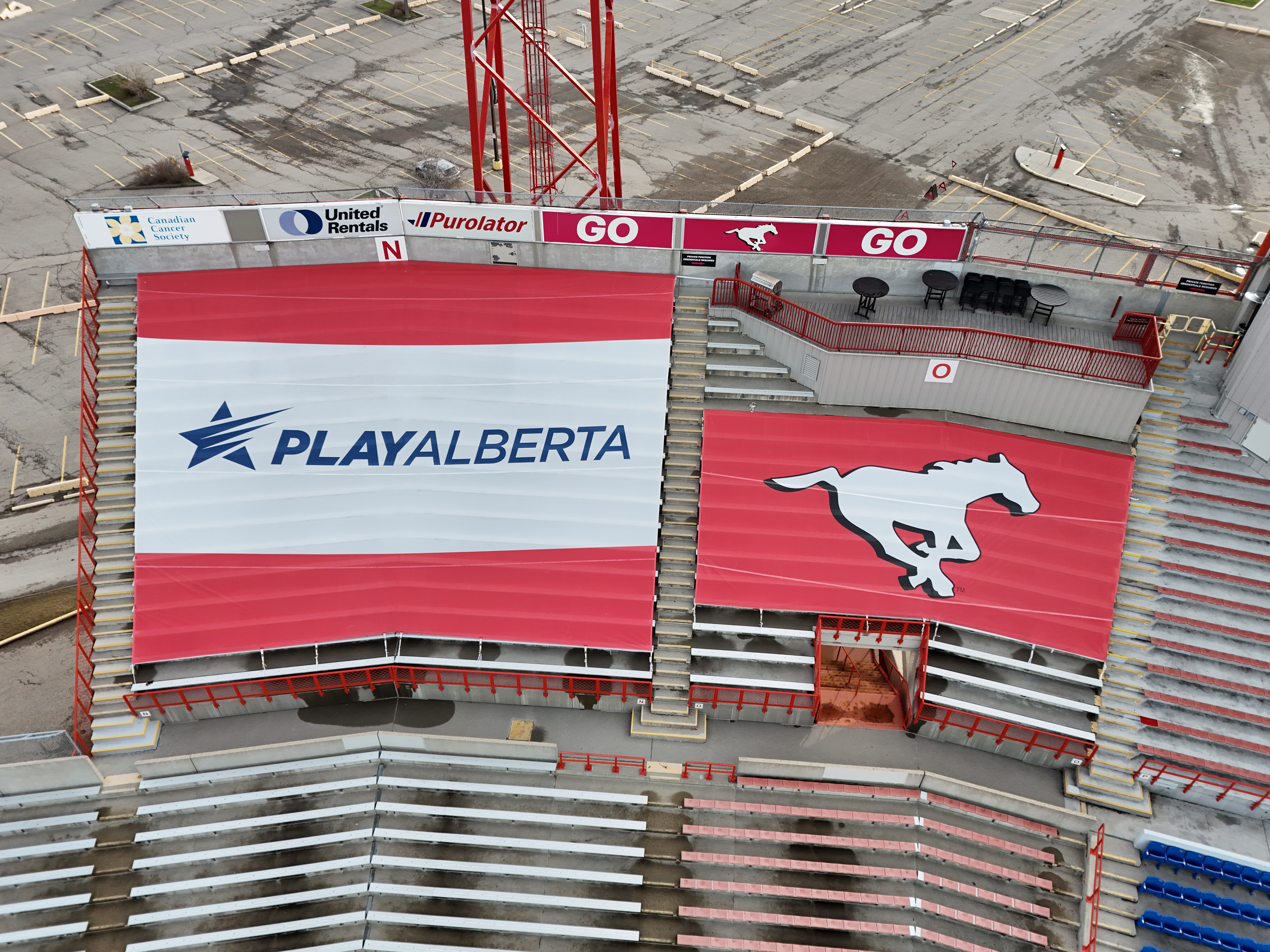
Tarps are installed due to dwindling attendance

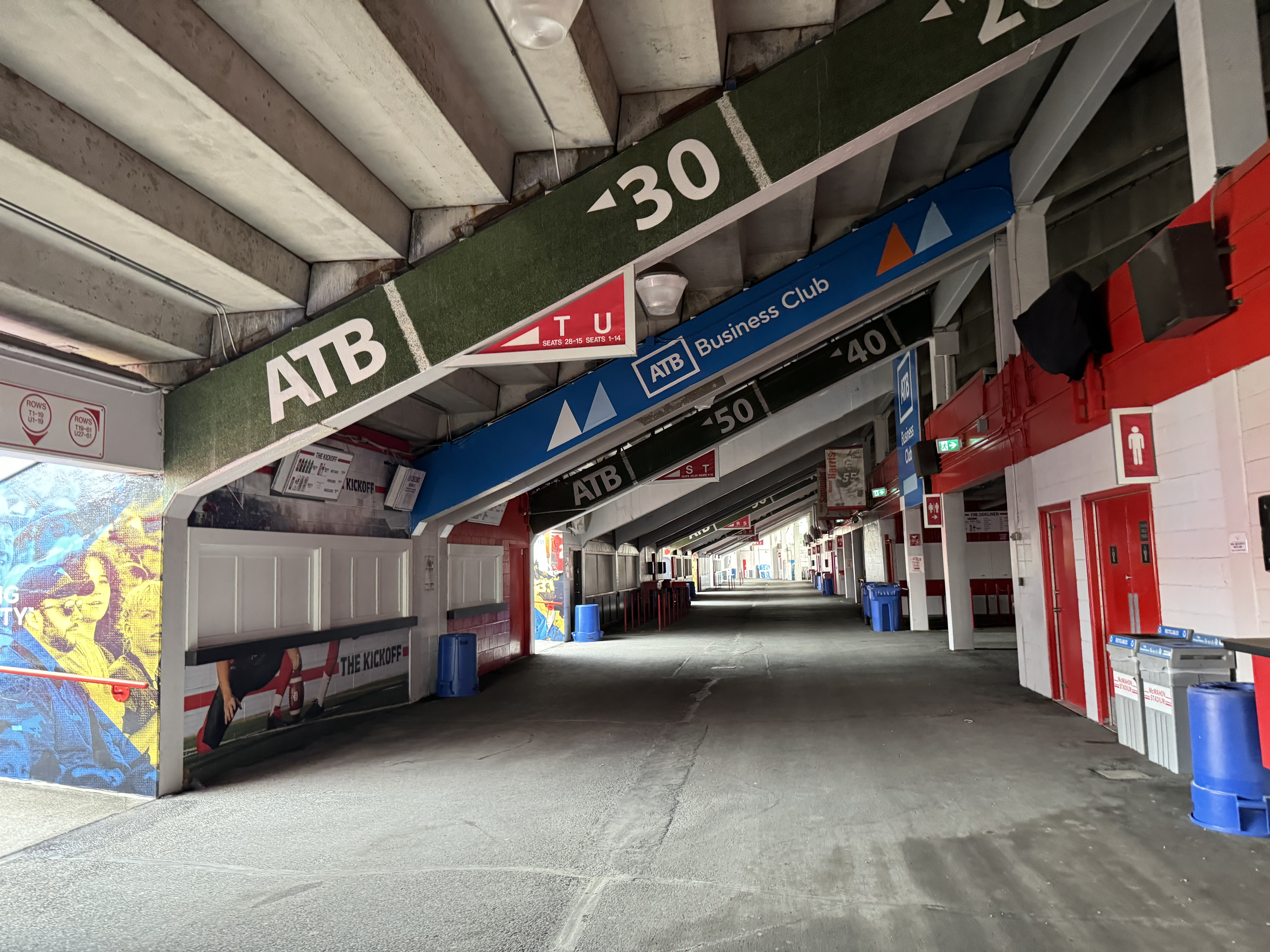
Concourse

== See also ==
- List of Canadian Football League stadiums
- CalgaryNEXT, a formerly proposed replacement for McMahon Stadium
- Calgary Stampeders, the CFL franchise that McMahon Stadium is most well known for hosting
