= Crowchild Trail =

Highway in Calgary, Alberta

Crowchild Trail
- Crowchild Trail highlighted in red

Route information
- Maintained by City of Calgary
- Length: 22.0 km (13.7 mi)

Major junctions
- South end: Linden Drive SW
- Glenmore Trail; Bow Trail; Memorial Drive; Highway 1 (16 Avenue NW); Shaganappi Trail; Highway 201 (Stoney Trail)
- North end: 12 Mile Coulee Road

Location
- Country: Canada
- Province: Alberta
- Major cities: Calgary

Highway system
- Alberta Numbered Highway Network; List; Former
- Roads in Calgary

Crowchild Trail is a major expressway in western Calgary, Alberta. The segment from the 12 Mile Coulee Road at the edge of the city to Stoney Trail is designated as Highway 1A by Alberta Transportation; however, prior to the completion of Stoney Trail the Highway 1A designation formerly extended to 16 Avenue NW (Trans-Canada Highway, Highway 1). The road is a critical north–south link in West Calgary for both downtown-bound traffic and travel between the two quadrants of the city it passes through. Although planned to be one single freeway from Glenmore Trail to the city limits, the route is divided by a section of slow-moving arterial road with four signalized intersections between 24 Avenue and Memorial Drive. This separates the freeway in the northwest from the freeway south of the Bow River. Filling the gap and making the whole route a minimum six-lane freeway is planned for construction beyond 2027.

== Route description ==
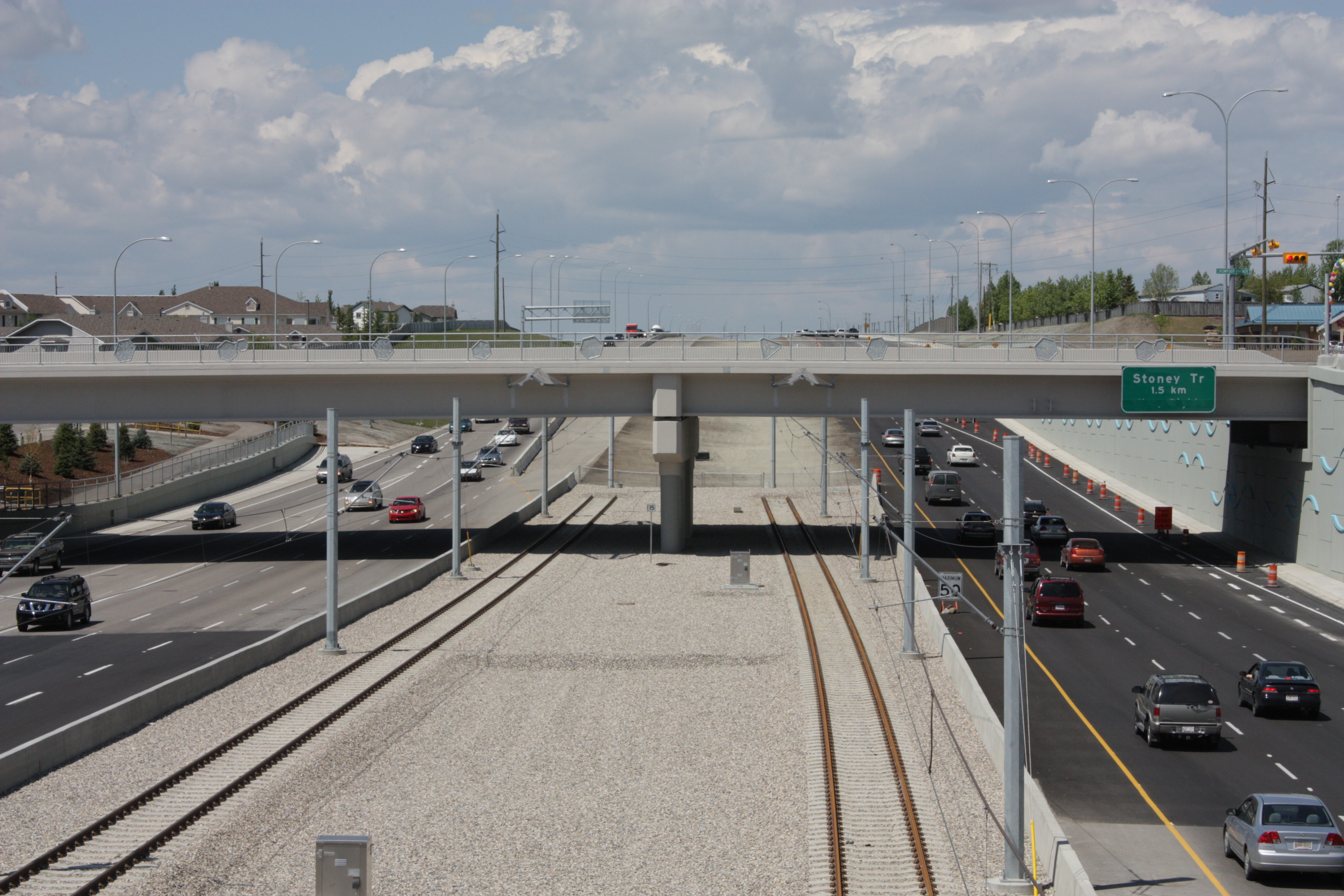
Crowchild Trail in Northwest Calgary with the CTrain on median

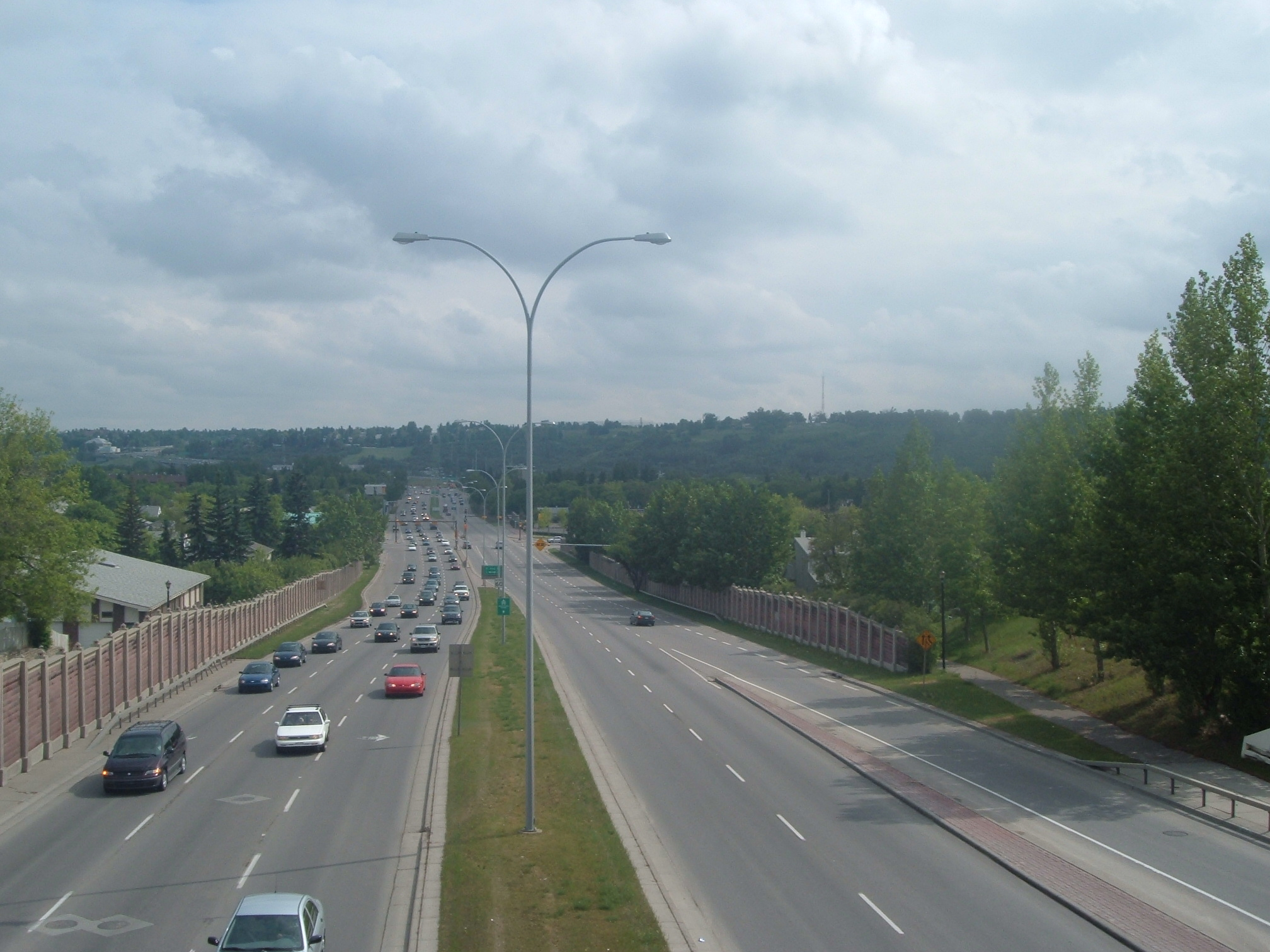
Crowchild Trail and 5th Avenue signal lights on approach to the Bow River from Northwest Calgary.

Crowchild Trail's south terminus is located at North Glenmore Park as a minor park access road. It soon exits the park and becomes a minor arterial road where it intersects several residential streets within the communities of Lakeview and North Glenmore Park, several residential dwellings are located on the Trail itself. Continuing northward, its first major intersection is with Glenmore Trail at an interchange that was built in 1981. Traffic flows freely from Westbound Glenmore on to Crowchild north and vice versa through a 2-lane flyover but all other movements on Crowchild pass through signal lights. North of this interchange Crowchild becomes a freeway, following Glenmore there are interchanges at 50th Avenue SW, Flanders Avenue SW, 33 Avenue SW and 17 Avenue SW. From there it enters a system interchange with 10 Avenue SW and Bow Trail before crossing the Bow River on an eight-lane bridge. The south section of freeway from Glenmore to Bow Trail has eight through lanes, however the outermost set are HOV lanes for public transit only, leaving six lanes for drivers. After crossing the Bow River it passes through an incomplete systems interchange at Memorial Drive before the freeway ends. The speed limit on the freeway sections of Crowchild are to 70–80 km/h (43–50 mph).

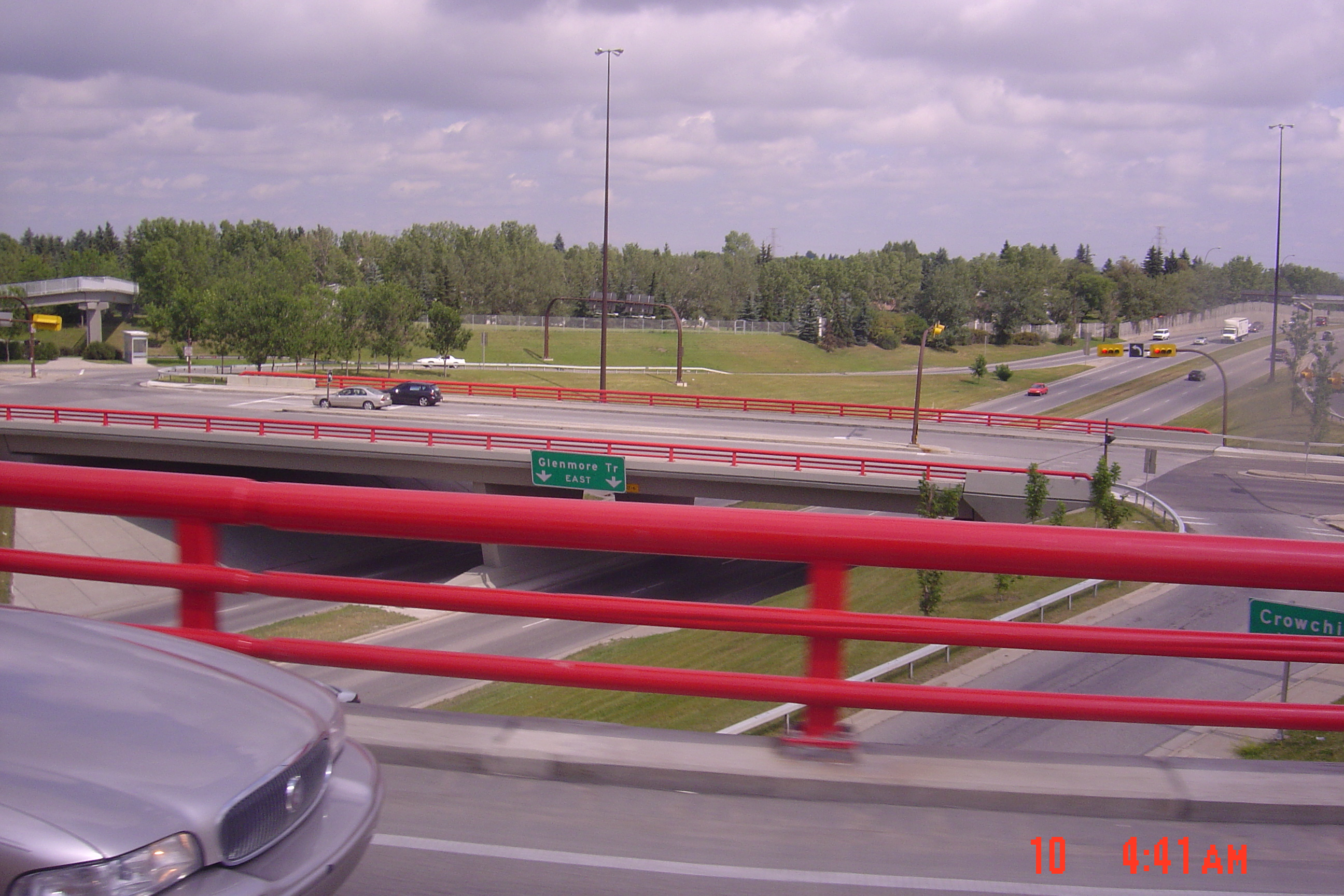
View of the Crowchild Trail, Glenmore Trail interchange from the south to east flyover

Traffic slows immediately north of the Memorial Drive (dropping to a seven lane wide principal arterial with a 60 km/h (37 mph) limit), passing signal-controlled intersections at Kensington Road NW and 5 Avenue NW. Then it climbs out of the river valley passing through an outdated interchange complex from the 60s at 16th Avenue and University Drive. Through that interchange Crowchild trail narrows to a total of four lanes forming a major bottleneck. It then continues up the hill widening to six lanes again before passing lights at 23 Avenue and 24 Avenue. This section of the road is heavily used by football fans from McMahon Stadium and students of the University of Calgary at certain times of the day. After 24 Avenue NW the road veers northwest, and once again becomes an uninterrupted freeway. CTrain tracks enter the median of the road at that point and run along the freeway for the rest of its distance with five CTrain stations located on the median all accessed by pedestrian bridges. Crowchild passes through eight interchanges until the Stoney Trail ring road where a cloverleaf interchange was completed in 2012. The total number of lanes then drops from six to four as it passes Tuscany Station which is the end of the CTrain line. At Twelve Mile Coulee Road the freeway ends and it passes through a set of signal lights before exiting the city as Highway 1A (The Crowchild Trail name is dropped when the road leaves the city). The highway continues as Bow Valley Trail (Highway 1A), eventually reaching Cochrane and Canmore.

== History ==
Part of this road was the Morley Trail when it was an actual trail (Morley Trail still exists as a collector road nearby). It was first paved in the 1930s. It then became the main highway to Banff and was the home of Eamon's Bungalow Camp and service station. When the Trans-Canada Highway was created it dropped in importance.

The road was originally signed as 24 Street SW from North Glenmore Park to the Bow River, 24 Street NW from the Bow River to the intersection with 16 Avenue NW, and Highway 1A from 16 Avenue NW to the city limits. The interchanges at Memorial Drive, 16 Avenue/University Drive, 17 Avenue and Bow Trail were constructed in the 60s in conjunction with the six lane bridge across the river, this was largely before plans for a road network were put together. Starting in 1969 the city began to plan a large freeway network and Crowchild Trail was included in the plans. Most freeways originally proposed for the west side of the city never ended up being constructed to a large extent, these roads include 16 Avenue, Sarcee Trail, 14 Street, Bow trail Downtown Feeder and Shaganappi Trail. In March 1971, it was renamed Crowchild Trail in honour of David Crowchild, Chief of the Tsuu T'ina Nation from 1946 to 1953.

The first detailed plans for the whole length of Crowchild were created in 1978 and included a north project and a south project. Prior to then, Crowchild was a 4-lane road with signal lights for most of its length with the exception of the few interchanges from the 60s in the Bow River Bridge area. The south project was completed as shown in the plans, with phase one built in the early 1980s which including the Glenmore flyover and the interchange at 33 Avenue. Phase two was completed in 2003 when an interchange opened at 50 Avenue SW and the whole south section was widened to its present 8-lane freeway arrangement.

The north plan provided plans for a full freeway from the river to the future ring road and LRT in the median past 24 Avenue. This plan was never properly implemented. While the first phase was supposed to included an interchange constructed at Kensington Road, the city ended up leaving the signal lights in this section and widened the road to six lanes as a temporary solution. Soon much of the other north plan was dropped including rebuilding the 16 Avenue interchange and an interchange at 24 Avenue, all of which was supposed to be complete before work began on the section of freeway beyond 24 Avenue. However in 1990s extension of the CTrain along the Crowchild Trail corridor beyond 24 Avenue renewed interest in upgrading that section to a freeway. In subsequent years the freeway got longer as the train was extended farther west with new interchanges being built at former signalized intersections. The train and freeway reached Dalhousie in 2003, Crowfoot in 2008 and the last interchange at Stoney was built in 2012 when the train reached Tuscany. Meanwhile the section between 24 Avenue and the Bow River without the C-Train right of way, which actually was planned to be built first, never was constructed resulting in traffic jams.

== Future ==
The original design of Crowchild Trail contained many bottlenecks and traffic congestion had become a growing problem on the route. Some problems were that the mostly six lane road narrowed to four lanes at Bow Trail, Memorial Drive and 16th Avenue and that the freeway between 24th Avenue and Memorial Drive was never built leaving four sets of signal lights and an old interchange complex with 16 Avenue. Congestion at the signal lights had become a daily issue as traffic volumes continue to climb. The biggest problem however was farther south on the six lane Bow River Bridge and neighboring interchanges. It was so poorly designed that northbound freeway traffic traveling between south of Bow Trail and north of Memorial Drive only had one through lane to travel on leading to large back-ups and queuing as people attempted to merge into that one lane. An oddly designed left-hand exit coming out of Downtown that forced traffic wishing to continue west on Memorial to merge across two lanes of congested traffic on the bridge only contributed to the problem. Northbound Traffic often backed up as far as 33 Avenue every rush hour and an accident would cause the back-up to be even worse. On many weekdays northbound delays of up to half an hour were common. The issue however was more than just poor road designed on the Crowchild Bridge and failure to complete the missing link in the freeway. Two other freeway routes crossing the Bow River farther west, Shaganappi Trail and Sarcee Trail were originally intended to complement Crowchild and evenly distribute north-south traffic flow in west Calgary. However both the Sarcee and Shaganappi river crossing projects were canceled in the early 2000s due to citizen opposition forcing Crowchild trail to carry more traffic than it was originally planned to take. The opening of Stoney Trail in the far west provided some relief, but traffic volumes continued to climb on the bridge. Another commonly congested area is approaching the Glenmore flyover southbound on Crowchild. This is due to a bottleneck on Glenmore at 14 Street that causes traffic to back-up Glenmore onto the Crowchild flyover, which contributes to half of Glenmore's traffic volume. The traffic then spills onto Crowchild trail, blocking two out of Crowchild's three lanes causing back-ups sometimes as far back as Flanders Avenue. Signs prohibiting U-turns are set up in Lakeview forbidding drivers from going straight into the neighborhood, performing a U-turn and then entering Glenmore after passing most of the traffic jam, however despite being illegal this maneuver is still made regularly.

In the spring of 2017, the City of Calgary approved the recommendations of the Crowchild Trail Study which specifically was meant to address the congestion and design issues between 17 Avenue SW and 24 Avenue NW. Short-term improvements include adding additional lanes across the Bow River Bridge and modifying the Bow Trail Interchange so the ramps entered from the right when going northbound rather than the left. Doing this tripled the number of through lanes from one to three eliminating the southbound traffic jam. Corrections of the Memorial Drive interchange to allow for a longer weave distance between Bow Trail and a fourth northbound lane through the two sets of traffic lights between Memorial Drive and University Drive were also included to additionally mitigate congestion, construction commenced in fall 2017 and was completed in fall 2020. As part of a separate Banff Trail Area improvement project, congestion mitigation for northbound traffic is being implemented by adding a fourth lane through the 24 Avenue signalized intersection. A ramp directly from eastbound 16 Avenue to northbound Crowchild is also included as part of the same project.

Medium-term improvements are meant to upgrade the section between the Bow River and 24 Avenue to a freeway. This include new interchanges at Kensington Road, 5 Avenue NW, and 24 Avenue NW, as well as replacement of the existing University Drive and 16 Avenue NW interchanges. The section between Kensington road and University Drive will be particularly expensive since houses will need to be expropriated in Sunnyside and the freeway will have to be trenched similar to Glenmore trail at Elbow Drive. A church at the corner of 24 Avenue and a set of apartment buildings at Suncourt Place will also have to be torn down to make room for the new road. Once the medium-term recommendations would be implemented, the remaining traffic signals would be removed and Crowchild Trail would be a freeway between Glenmore Trail and 12 Mile Coulee Road as was originally planned.

== Major intersections ==
From south to north, the following intersections are observed along Crowchild Trail. The entire route is in Calgary. All exits are unnumbered.

| km | mi | Destinations | Notes |
|---|---|---|---|
| 0.0 | 0.0 | Linden Drive | Continues into North Glenmore Park; begins as a residential street |
| 1.0 | 0.62 | Glenmore Trail | Interchange; freeway begins north of Glenmore Trail |
| 1.5 | 0.93 | 54 Avenue SW | Northbound right-in/right-out |
| 1.9 | 1.2 | 50 Avenue SW, Mount Royal Gate | To Mount Royal University |
| 2.8 | 1.7 | Flanders Avenue, Richard Road | |
| 3.6 | 2.2 | 33 Avenue SW | |
| 5.3 | 3.3 | 17 Avenue SW | |
| 5.9– 6.2 | 3.7– 3.9 | Bow Trail – City Centre | No northbound to westbound exit; no eastbound to southbound entrance |
| 5.9– 6.2 | 3.7– 3.9 | 10 Avenue SW | Southbound exit and northbound entrance |
| 6.2– 6.5 | 3.9– 4.0 | Crowchild Bridge across Bow River | |
| 6.5– 6.8 | 4.0– 4.2 | Memorial Drive | Interchange; westbound exit via Kensington Road (unsigned) |
| 7.1 | 4.4 | Kensington Road | At-grade, traffic signals |
| 7.6 | 4.7 | 5 Avenue NW | At-grade, traffic signals |
| 8.2– 8.7 | 5.1– 5.4 | University Drive | Interchange; northbound exit and southbound entrance; southbound exit via 13 Avenue NW (unsigned); to University of Calgary |
| 8.2– 8.7 | 5.1– 5.4 | 16 Avenue NW (Highway 1) | No westbound-to-northbound entrance; former Highway 1A eastern terminus; northbound exit and southbound entrance via University Drive; to Foothills Medical Centre and Alberta Children's Hospital |
| 9.1 | 5.7 | 23 Avenue NW | To McMahon Stadium |
| 9.3 | 5.8 | Banff Trail | Northbound right-in/right-out |
| 9.5 | 5.9 | 24 Avenue NW | At-grade, traffic signals; to University of Calgary; C-Train enters median; freeway resumes north of intersection |
| 10.2 | 6.3 | University station | |
| 10.6 | 6.6 | Charleswood Drive, 32 Avenue NW | To University of Calgary |
| 11.0 | 6.8 | Shopping Centre Access | Westbound exit only |
| 11.2 | 7.0 | Brentwood station | |
| 11.5 | 7.1 | Brisebois Drive, 40 Avenue NW | Access to Brentwood park and ride |
| 12.3 | 7.6 | Northland Drive | |
| 13.0 | 8.1 | Shaganappi Trail | |
| 13.9 | 8.6 | Dalhousie station | |
| 14.3 | 8.9 | 53 Street NW | Diamond interchange; access to Dalhousie park and ride |
| 15.4 | 9.6 | Sarcee Trail, Silver Springs Gate | |
| 17.4– 18.2 | 10.8– 11.3 | Nose Hill Drive | Diamond interchange, access to Crowfoot park and ride |
| 17.4– 18.2 | 10.8– 11.3 | Crowfoot station | |
| 17.4– 18.2 | 10.8– 11.3 | Crowfoot Rise | Westbound exit and entrance |
| 18.9– 20.3 | 11.7– 12.6 | Stoney Trail (Highway 201); Highway 1A begins | Interchange; Highway 201 exit 41; Highway 1A eastern terminus |
| 20.3 | 12.6 | Tuscany station (Red Line terminus) | |
| 22.0 | 13.7 | 12 Mile Coulee Road | At-grade, traffic signals; Calgary city limits |
| 22.0 | 13.7 | Highway 1A west (Bow Valley Trail) – Cochrane, Canmore | Continues west |
1.000 mi = 1.609 km; 1.000 km = 0.621 mi: Incomplete access; Route transition

== Gallery ==
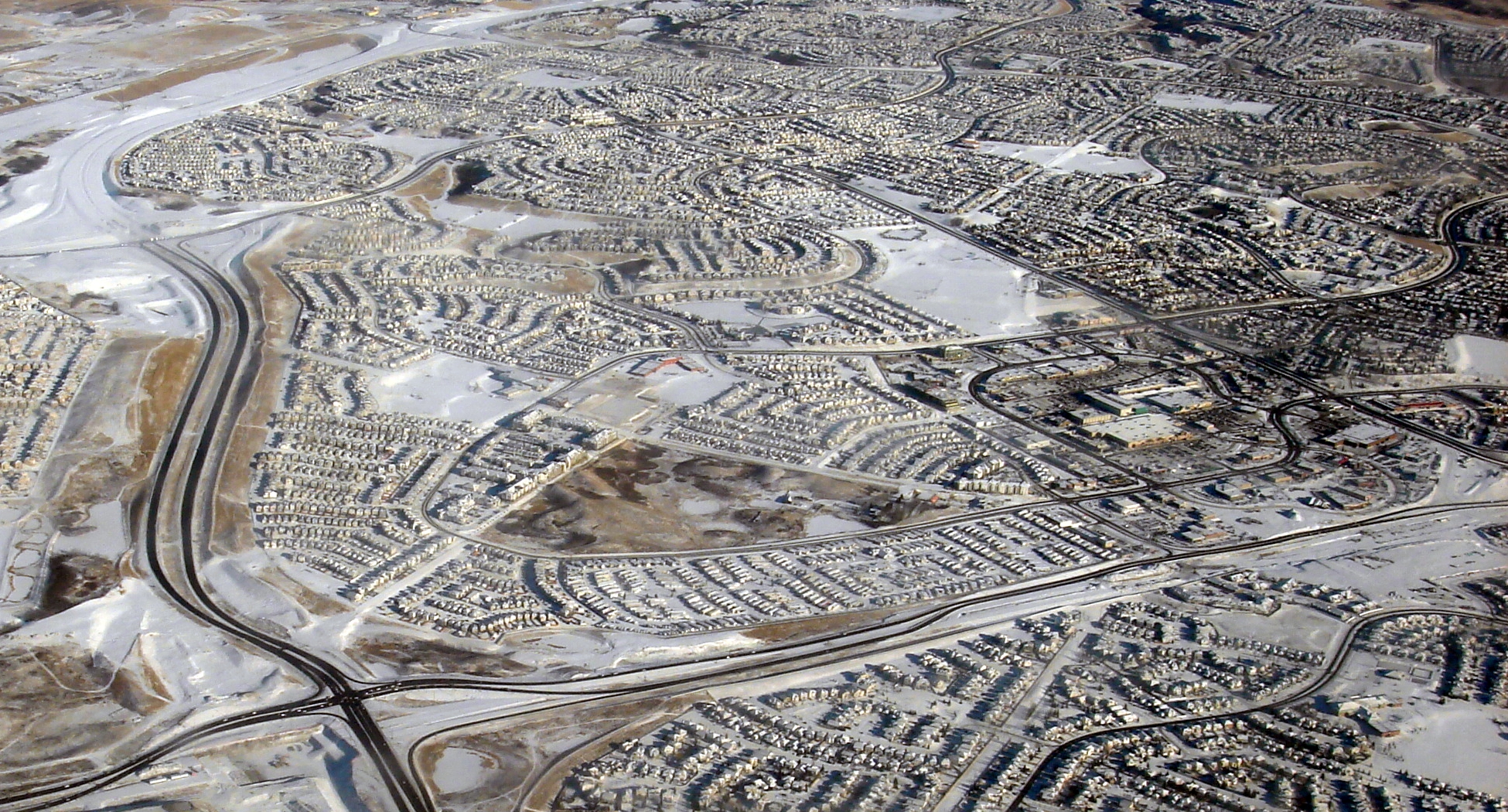
Crowchild Trail at the interchange with Stoney Trail

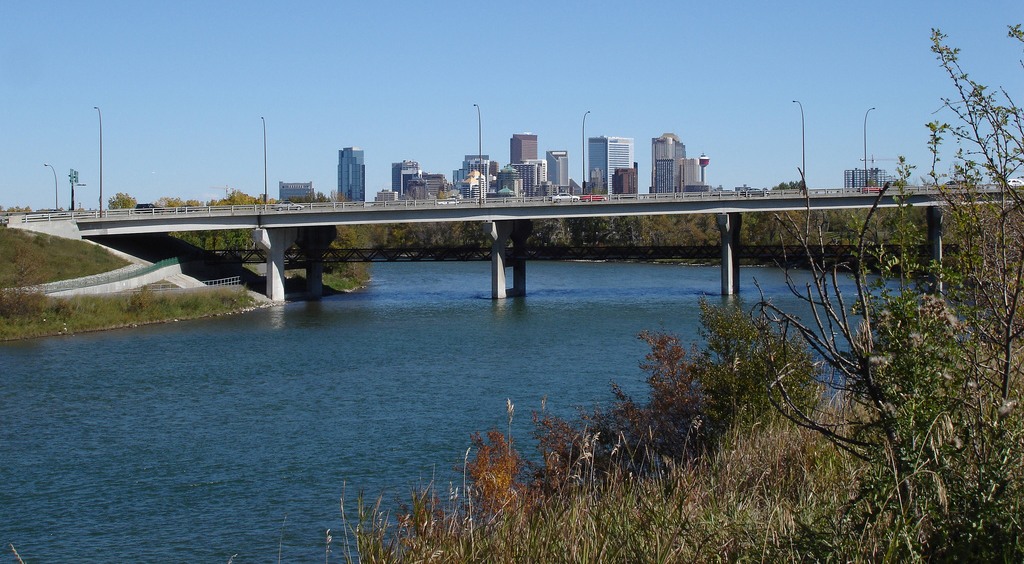
Bridge over Bow River

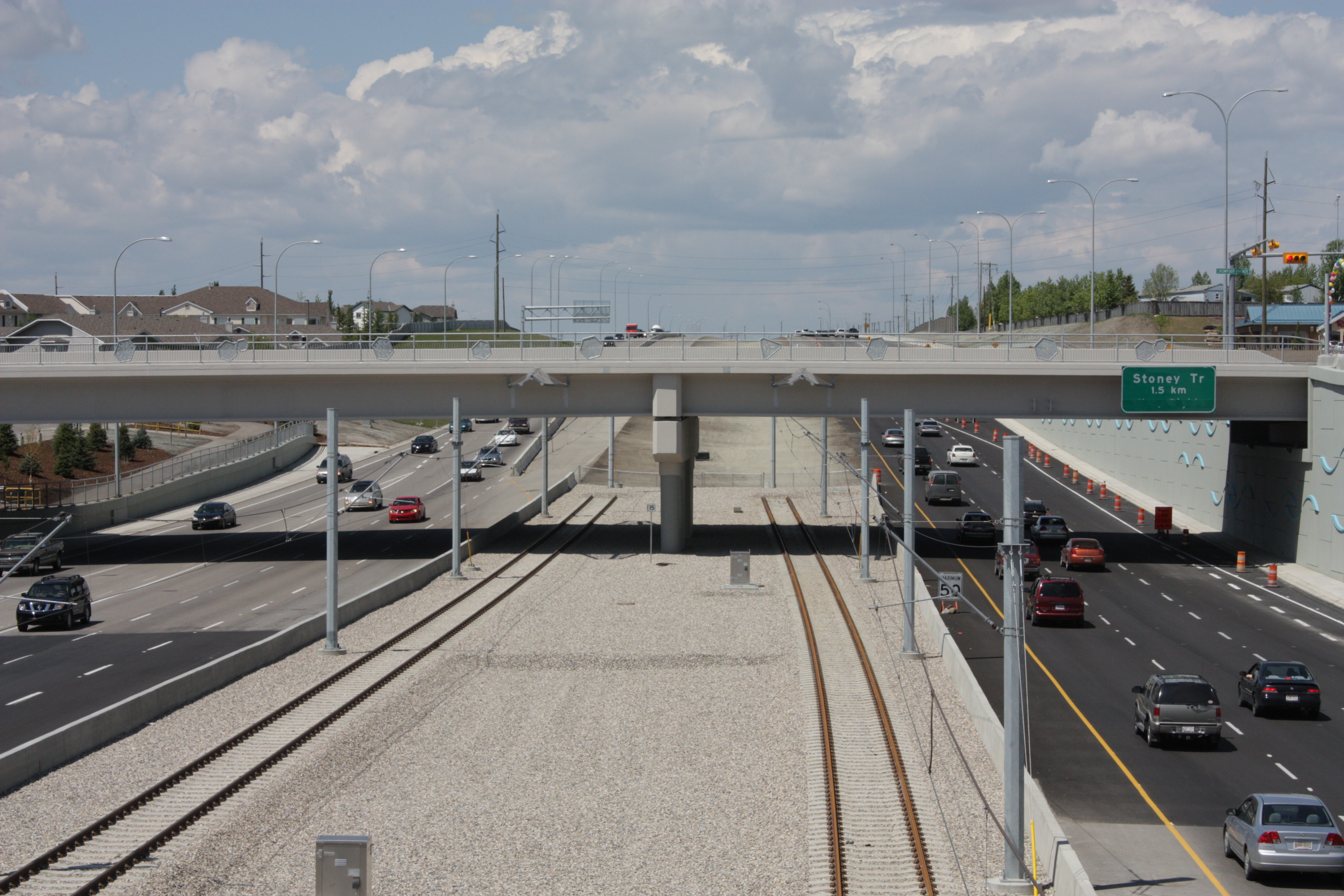
C-Train tracks along Crowchild Trail

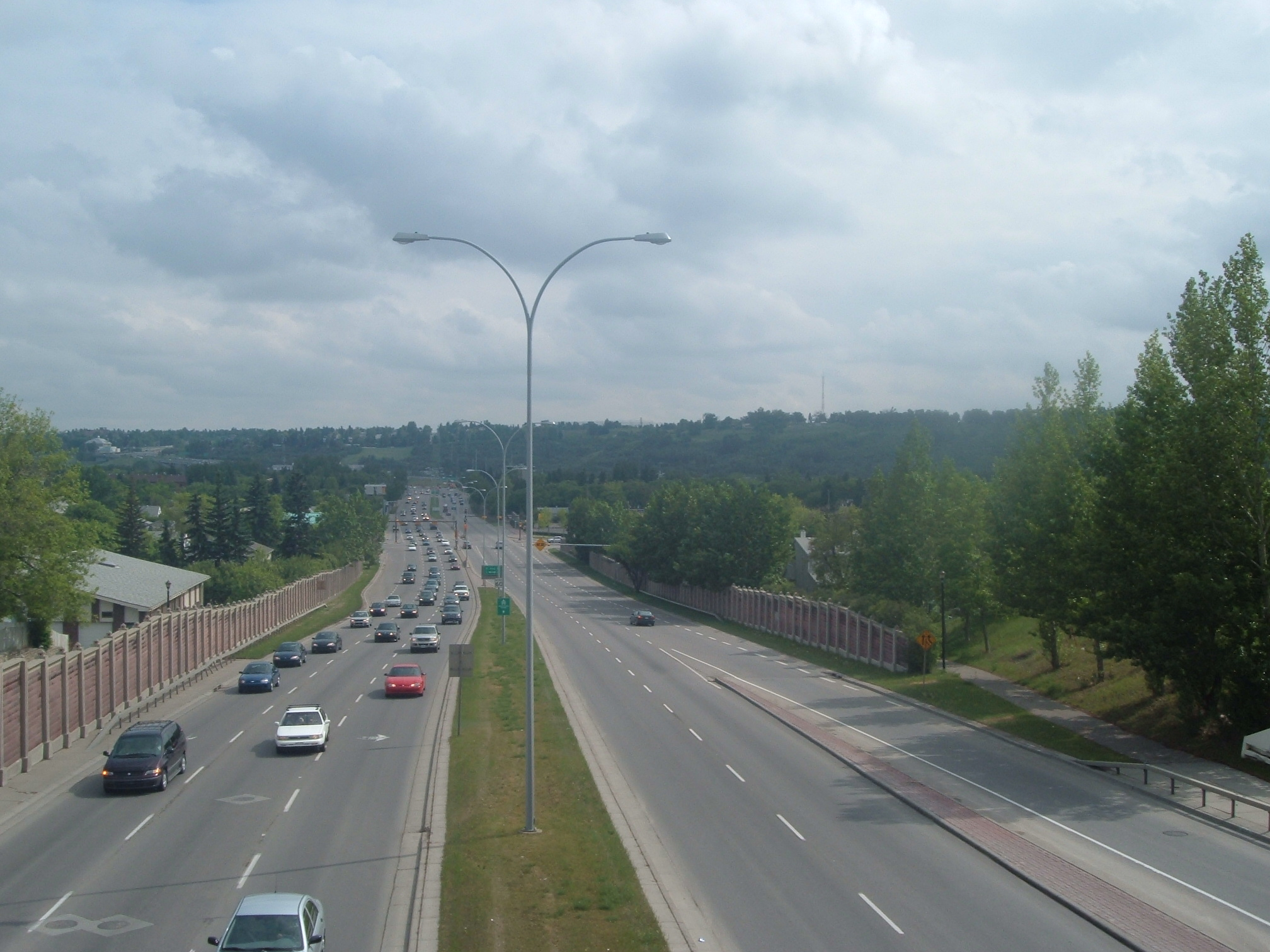
Looking south just north of 5 Ave NW

== See also ==
- Highway 1A
- Transportation in Calgary
