= Eagle Ridge =

Eagle Ridge may refer to:

== Places ==
- Eagle Ridge, Calgary, a neighborhood in Calgary, Alberta
- Eagle Ridge (Coquitlam), a neighborhood in Coquitlam, British Columbia
- Eagle Ridge (Omaha), a neighborhood near Papillion in the Omaha metropolitan area in Nebraska

== Schools ==
- Eagle Ridge Junior High School, a school in Savage, Minnesota
- A school in the Loudoun County Public Schools, Virginia
- Eagle Ridge Elementary School, a school in Coquitlam, British Columbia

== Other ==
- Eagle Ridge Golf Club (disambiguation), one of a number of golf courses in the United States
- Eagle Ridge Hospital, a hospital in Coquitlam, British Columbia
- A commonly used alternate name for Eagle Mountain, located near Coquitlam, British Columbia
