= Eagle Ridge, Calgary =

Eagle Ridge
- Neighbourhood
- Location of Eagle Ridge in Calgary
- Coordinates: 50°59′06″N 114°05′51″W
- Country: Canada
- Province: Alberta
- City: Calgary
- Quadrant: SW
- Ward: 11
- Established: 1960

Government
  - Mayor: Jeromy Farkas
  - Administrative body: Calgary City Council
  - Councillor: Rob Ward (Communities First)

Area
  - Total: 0.4 km^{2} (0.15 sq mi)
- Elevation: 1,085 m (3,560 ft)

Population (2019)
  - Total: 302
  - Median household income: $263,754
- Website: CKE Community Association

Eagle Ridge is an affluent residential neighbourhood situated on a peninsula in the Glenmore Reservoir in the southwest quadrant of Calgary, Alberta, Canada. The community is known for its unique proximity to green spaces and parks, recreational waterways, and Calgary's multi-use urban pathway system despite its relative proximity to the city's denser downtown core and adjoining communities. In 2014, Eagle Ridge was ranked the 18th wealthiest neighbourhood in Canada and 3rd wealthiest in Calgary. One of Calgary's smallest neighbourhoods by population, Eagle Ridge is physically secluded from other nearby communities due to the Glenmore Reservoir acting as natural boundary to its north, west, and south, while 14 Street W bounds the community to the east.

Directly adjacent to Eagle Ridge is the Heritage Park Historical Village, which borders the community to the west on the banks of the reservoir. Other landmarks in the neighbourhood’s vicinity include the Heritage Marina beach, North Glenmore Park, the Glenmore Reservoir, Earl Grey Golf Club, Calgary Golf & Country Club, Glenmore Sailing Club, Calgary Rowing Club, the Elbow River, Weaslehead Flats, Rockyview General Hospital, the Glenmore Landing shopping area, and Chinook Centre.

The community is represented in the Calgary City Council by the Ward 11 Councillor. It is represented in the Legislative Assembly of Alberta by the MLA for Calgary-Glenmore and in the House of Commons of Canada by the Member of Parliament for Calgary Heritage. At the neighbourhood level it is represented by the CKE Community Association (Chinook-Kelvin Grove-Eagle Ridge) and is therefore a member of the only tri-community in Calgary. Eagle Ridge is the westernmost, and, alongside adjacent communities Kelvin Grove, Chinook Park, and Kingsland, northernmost neighbourhood in the greater area/district collectively referred to as “Heritage”, of which a total of 10 communities are included.

== History ==
Indigenous occupation of the area around Eagle Ridge has been archaeologically traced back to the end of the last ice age.

The land that now comprises Eagle Ridge was part of the settlement of Sam Livingston, an agricultural pioneer who raised cattle, crops, and imported fruit trees. After Livingston's 1897 death, his wife, Jane, and their children continued to inhabit the area.

Eagle Ridge was subdivided in 1960 by the Kelwood Corporation.

Eagle Ridge is the site of Calgary's first condominium, Covenant House.

== Demographics ==
In the 2019 Calgary Civic Census, Eagle Ridge had a population of 302 living in 110 dwellings, a -2.9% increase from its 2018 population of 311. Over 90% of dwellings were single-family homes, the rest consisting of mid-rise condominium buildings. With a land area of 0.4 km^{2} (0.15 sq mi), it had a population density of 755/km^{2} in 2019.

In 2015, residents in this community had a before tax median household income of $263,754 (62% of private households had a total household income of at least $200,000). According to Canada's Richest Neighbourhoods, an index produced by the magazine Canadian Business and Environics Research Group, in 2014 Eagle Ridge was ranked the 18th wealthiest neighbourhood in Canada and 3rd wealthiest in Calgary, with an average household net worth of $6.55 million, an average annual household income of $660,328, and home prices averaging $1.13 million.

As of 2016, approximately 15% of residents were immigrants, of which the majority arrived in Canada before 1981. Approximately 75% of immigrants migrated from Europe and 25% from the Americas. The community has a high rate of bilingualism in Canada's two official languages, English and French, relative to the rest of the city. In 2016, 25% of residents reported knowledge of both French and English. French was reported as the mother tongue and language most often spoken at home by 7% of residents while English was reported as the mother tongue for 79% of residents; 14% of residents indicated a mother tongue other than English and French. Approximately 2% of residents represented visible minorities.

== Crime ==
Crime Data
Year	Crime Rate (/100 pop.)
2018	14.6
2019	17.7
2020	12.3
2021	12.3
2022	13.5
2023	17.3

== Education ==
The community is served by École Chinook Park School, a bilingual elementary school, and Henry Wise Wood Senior High School, neither of which are physically located within Eagle Ridge itself but in the adjacent community of Kelvin Grove.

== Accessibility and transport ==
The community is accessible by foot, bicycle, car, and public transit.

Given its position at the confluence of the Glenmore Reservoir and the Elbow River, Eagle Ridge is directly accessible by foot or bicycle via two of Calgary's largest regional pathway networks: the Glenmore Reservoir and Elbow River multi-use urban pathways. By way of the active mobility deck atop the Glenmore Dam, the community can also be accessed via the 20 Street SW bike lane and the multi-use urban pathway adjacent to Glenmore Trail W.

By car, the neighbourhood's collector road (75 Avenue SW) and residential entrance (Eagle Ridge Drive SW) can be accessed by 14 Street W, which connects to Glenmore Trail W to the north and Heritage Drive SW to the south. The community is connected to Calgary Transit's rapid transit network through both the MAX BRT (bus rapid transit) and CTrain (light rail transit) systems. The Rockyview BRT station, located at the community's entrance, services the MAX Teal and Max Yellow lines. The Heritage CTrain station, located approximately 3.4 km to the southwest of the community, services the Red Line (LRT).

== Amenities ==
The community has a playground, picnic space, and small community ice rink at its centre, the latter of which is only open during the winter.

See also

- List of neighbourhoods in Calgary
