= Economic statistics of the United States =

This article contains economic statistics for the United States dating back to 1929. Included are relevant statistics about GDP, personal income, household wealth, international trade, government finance, labor, industry and agriculture.

== Main indicators ==
The following table shows the development of the different important indicators of the US economy over time, including nominal and real GDP. Green and red arrows in the table are showing decreasing/increasing values or positive/negative values. Inflation over 2% is shown in red.

Year	Nominal GDP (billion $)	Annual Change (in %)	Real GDP (billion 2017$)	Annual Change (in %)	Inflation rate (in %)	GDP per capita (in $)	Median personal income per capita (2025$)	Household net worth (billion $)
1929	104.6		1,191.1			858		
1930	▼92.2	▼-11.9	▼1,089.8	▼-8.5		▼748		
1931	▼77.4	▼-16	▼1,020.0	▼-6.4		▼623		
1932	▼59.5	▼-23.1	▼888.4	▼-12.9		▼476		
1933	▼57.2	▼-4	▼877.4	▼-1.2		▼455		
1934	▲66.8	▲16.9	▲972.3	▲10.8		▲528		
1935	▲74.2	▲11.1	▲1,058.8	▲8.9		▲583		
1936	▲84.8	▲14.3	▲1,195.3	▲12.9		▲662		
1937	▲93.0	▲9.6	▲1,256.5	▲5.1		▲721		
1938	▼87.4	▼-6.1	▼1,214.9	▼-3.3		▼672		
1939	▲93.4	▲7	▲1,312.4	▲8		▲713		
1940	▲102.9	▲10.1	▲1,428.1	▲8.8		▲779		
1941	▲129.3	▲25.7	▲1,681.0	▲17.7		▲969		
1942	▲166.0	▲28.3	▲1,998.5	▲18.9		▲1,231		
1943	▲203.1	▲22.4	▲2,338.8	▲17		▲1,485		
1944	▲224.4	▲10.5	▲2,524.8	▲7.9		▲1,622		
1945	▲228.0	▲1.6	▲2,500.1	▼-1		▲1,629		
1946	▼227.5	▼-0.2	▲2,209.9	▼-11.6		▼1,609		
1947	▲249.6	▲9.7	▼2,184.6	▼-1.1		▲1,732		
1948	▲274.5	▲10	▲2,274.6	▲4.1		▲1,872		
1949	▼272.5	▼-0.7	▼2,261.9	▼-0.6		▼1,826		
1950	▲299.8	▲10	▲2,458.5	▲8.7		▲1,977		
1951	▲346.9	▲15.7	▲2,656.3	▲8		▲2,248		
1952	▲367.3	▲5.9	▲2,764.8	▲4.1		▲2,340		
1953	▲389.2	▲6	▲2,894.4	▲4.7		▲2,439		
1954	▲390.5	▲0.3	▼2,877.7	▼-0.6		▼2,405		
1955	▲425.5	▲8.9	▲3,083.0	▲7.1		▲2,574		
1956	▲449.4	▲5.6	▲3,148.8	▲2.1		▲2,671		
1957	▲474.0	▲5.5	▲3,215.1	▲2.1		▲2,768		
1958	▲481.2	▲1.5	▼3,191.2	▼-0.7		▼2,763		
1959	▲521.7	▲8.4	▲3,412.4	▲6.9		▲2,945		
1960	▲542.4	▲4	▲3,500.3	▲2.6	▲1.5	▲3,001		
1961	▲562.2	▲3.7	▲3,590.1	▲2.6	▲1.1	▲3,060		
1962	▲603.9	▲7.4	▲3,810.1	▲6.1	▲1.2	▲3,237		
1963	▲637.5	▲5.6	▲3,976.1	▲4.4	▲1.2	▲3,367		
1964	▲684.5	▲7.4	▲4,205.3	▲5.8	▲1.3	▲3,566		
1965	▲742.3	▲8.4	▲4,478.6	▲6.5	▲1.6	▲3,819		
1966	▲813.4	▲9.6	▲4,773.9	▲6.6	▲3.0	▲4,137		
1967	▲860.0	▲5.7	▲4,904.9	▲2.7	▲2.8	▲4,327		
1968	▲940.7	▲9.4	▲5,145.9	▲4.9	▲4.3	▲4,686		
1969	▲1,017.6	▲8.2	▲5,306.6	▲3.1	▲5.5	▲5,019		
1970	▲1,073.3	▲5.5	▲5,316.4	▲0.2	▲5.8	▲5,233		
1971	▲1,164.9	▲8.5	▲5,491.4	▲3.3	▲4.3	▲5,609		
1972	▲1,279.1	▲9.8	▲5,780.0	▲5.3	▲3.3	▲6,093		
1973	▲1,425.4	▲11.4	▲6,106.4	▲5.6	▲6.2	▲6,725		
1974	▲1,545.2	▲8.4	▼6,073.4	▼-0.5	▲11.1	▲7,224	29,420	
1975	▲1,684.9	▲9	▼6,060.9	▼-0.2	▲9.1	▲7,801	▼28,840	
1976	▲1,873.4	▲11.2	▲6,387.4	▲5.4	▲5.7	▲8,590	▲28,910	
1977	▲2,081.8	▲11.1	▲6,682.8	▲4.6	▲6.5	▲9,450	▲29,090	
1978	▲2,351.6	▲13	▲7,052.7	▲5.5	▲7.6	▲10,563	▼28,850	
1979	▲2,627.3	▲11.7	▲7,276.0	▲3.2	▲11.3	▲11,672	▼28,060	
1980	▲2,857.3	▲8.8	▼7,257.3	▼-0.3	▲13.5	▲12,547	▼27,670	
1981	▲3,207.0	▲12.2	▲7,441.5	▲2.5	▲10.3	▲13,943	▼27,130	
1982	▲3,343.8	▲4.3	▼7,307.3	▼-1.8	▲6.1	▲14,399	▲27,410	
1983	▲3,634.0	▲8.7	▲7,642.3	▲4.6	▲3.2	▲15,508	▲27,970	
1984	▲4,037.6	▲11.1	▲8,195.3	▲7.2	▲4.3	▲17,080	▲28,770	
1985	▲4,339.0	▲7.5	▲8,537.0	▲4.2	▲3.5	▲18,192	▲29,400	
1986	▲4,579.6	▲5.5	▲8,832.6	▲3.5	▲1.9	▲19,028	▲30,340	
1987	▲4,855.2	▲6	▲9,137.7	▲3.5	▲3.7	▲19,993	▲30,770	17,426
1988	▲5,236.4	▲7.9	▲9,519.4	▲4.2	▲4.1	▲21,368	▲31,710	▲19,117
1989	▲5,641.6	▲7.7	▲9,869.0	▲3.7	▲4.8	▲22,805	▲32,540	▲20,814
1990	▲5,963.1	▲5.7	▲10,055.1	▲1.9	▲5.4	▲23,835	▼32,210	▲21,476
1991	▲6,158.1	▲3.3	▼10,044.2	▼-0.1	▲4.2	▲24,290	▼31,740	▲22,953
1992	▲6,520.3	▲5.9	▲10,398.0	▲3.5	▲3.0	▲25,379	▼31,400	▲24,088
1993	▲6,858.6	▲5.2	▲10,684.2	▲2.7	▲3.0	▲26,350	▲31,720	▲25,542
1994	▲7,287.2	▲6.3	▲11,114.6	▲4	▲2.6	▲27,660	▲32,080	▲26,442
1995	▲7,639.7	▲4.8	▲11,413.0	▲2.7	▲2.8	▲28,658	▲32,980	▲28,599
1996	▲8,073.1	▲5.7	▲11,843.6	▲3.8	▲2.9	▲29,932	▲33,680	▲30,532
1997	▲8,577.6	▲6.2	▲12,370.3	▲4.4	▲2.3	▲31,424	▲35,170	▲33,584
1998	▲9,062.8	▲5.7	▲12,924.9	▲4.5	▲1.6	▲32,818	▲36,910	▲37,274
1999	▲9,631.2	▲6.3	▲13,543.8	▲4.8	▲2.2	▲34,480	▲37,310	▲41,106
2000	▲10,251.0	▲6.4	▲14,096.0	▲4.1	▲3.4	▲36,300	▲37,700	▲42,193
2001	▲10,581.9	▲3.2	▲14,230.7	▲1	▲2.8	▲37,100	▼37,580	▲43,792
2002	▲10,929.1	▲3.3	▲14,472.7	▲1.7	▲1.6	▲37,954	▼37,430	▼43,603
2003	▲11,456.5	▲4.8	▲14,877.3	▲2.8	▲2.3	▲39,420	▲37,580	▲48,324
2004	▲12,217.2	▲6.6	▲15,449.8	▲3.8	▲2.7	▲41,660	▼37,540	▲54,793
2005	▲13,039.2	▲6.7	▲15,988.0	▲3.5	▲3.4	▲44,052	▼38,230	▲60,012
2006	▲13,815.6	▲6	▲16,433.1	▲2.8	▲3.2	▲46,234	▲39,400	▲64,274
2007	▲14,474.2	▲4.8	▲16,762.4	▲2	▲2.9	▲47,976	▲39,650	▲65,772
2008	▲14,769.9	▲2	▲16,781.5	▲0.1	▲3.8	▲48,498	▼38,090	▼57,532
2009	▼14,478.1	▼-2	▼16,349.1	▼-2.6	▼-0.4	▼47,123	▼37,690	▲58,407
2010	▲15,049.0	▲3.9	▲16,789.8	▲2.7	▲1.6	▲48,570	▼37,240	▲62,433
2011	▲15,599.7	▲3.7	▲17,052.4	▲1.6	▲3.2	▲49,952	▼36,690	▲63,331
2012	▲16,254.0	▲4.2	▲17,442.8	▲2.3	▲2.1	▲51,645	▼36,540	▲67,973
2013	▲16,880.7	▲3.9	▲17,812.2	▲2.1	▲1.5	▲53,235	▲37,020	▲76,129
2014	▲17,608.1	▲4.3	▲18,261.7	▲2.5	▲1.6	▲55,094	▲37,930	▲81,957
2015	▲18,295.0	▲3.9	▲18,799.6	▲2.9	▲0.1	▲56,797	▲39,910	▲84,755
2016	▲18,804.9	▲2.8	▲19,141.7	▲1.8	▲1.3	▲57,931	▲40,680	▲89,602
2017	▲19,612.1	▲4.3	▲19,612.1	▲2.5	▲2.1	▲60,002	▲41,090	▲97,809
2018	▲20,656.5	▲5.3	▲20,193.9	▲3	▲2.4	▲62,825	▲42,480	▲98,445
2019	▲21,540.0	▲4.3	▲20,715.7	▲2.6	▲1.8	▲65,171	▲44,680	▲110,501
2020	▼21,354.1	▼-0.9	▼20,284.6	▼-2.1	▲1.2	▼64,414	▼44,070	▲124,123
2021	▲23,681.2	▲10.9	▲21,556.8	▲6.3	▲4.7	▲71,416	▲44,140	▲142,088
2022	▲26,059.9	▲9.8	▲22,079.7	▲2.4	▲8.0	▲77,941	▲44,220	▼135,667
2023	▲27,825.9	▲6.6	▲22,724.1	▲2.9	▲4.1	▲82,548	▲44,380	▲146,634
2024	▲29,381.0	▲5.6	▲23,394.9	▲3.0	▲2.9	▲86,390	▲46,140	▲160,345
2025	▲30,861.3	▲5.0	▲23,943.3	▲2.9	▲2.7	▲90,252	▲46,960	▲172,465

== Government financial indicators ==
The following table shows the development of the different important indicators of the US Government, including government debt and the budget balance. Green and red arrows in the table are showing decreasing/increasing values or positive/negative values

Year	Federal receipts (million $)	Federal outlays (million $)	Budget balance (million $)	Budget balance (% of GDP)	Gross Federal Debt (billion $)	Gross Federal Debt (in % of GDP)	Interest payment (million $)	Interest payment (% of GDP)	Federal funds rate (in %)
1929	3,862	3,127	▲734						
1930	▲4,058	▲3,320	▲738	▲0.8					
1931	▼3,116	▲3,577	▼-462	▼-0.5					
1932	▼1,924	▲4,659	▼-2,735	▼-4.0					
1933	▼1,997	▼4,598	▼-2,602	▼-4.5					
1934	▲2,955	▲6,541	▼-3,586	▼-5.8					
1935	▲3,609	▼6,412	▼-2,803	▼-4.0					
1936	▲3,923	▲8,228	▼-4,304	▼-5.4					
1937	▲5,387	▼7,580	▼-2,193	▼-2.5					
1938	▲6,751	▼6,840	▼-89	▼-0.1					
1939	▼6,295	▲9,141	▼-2,846	▼-3.1	48	51.6			
1940	▲6,548	▲9,468	▼-2,920	▼-3.0	▲51	▼49.3	899	0.9	
1941	▲8,712	▲13,653	▼-4,941	▼-4.3	▲58	▼44.5	▲943	▼0.7	
1942	▲14,634	▲35,137	▼-20,503	▼-13.9	▲79	▲47.7	▲1,052	▼0.6	
1943	▲24,001	▲78,555	▼-54,554	▼-29.6	▲143	▲70.2	▲1,529	▲0.8	
1944	▲43,747	▲91,304	▼-47,557	▼-22.2	▲204	▲90.9	▲2,219	▲1.0	
1945	▲45,159	▲92,712	▼-47,553	▼-21.0	▲260	▲114.1	▲3,112	▲1.4	
1946	▼39,296	▼55,232	▼-15,936	▼-7.0	▲271	▲119.1	▲4,111	▲1.8	
1947	▼38,514	▼34,496	▲4,018	▲1.7	▼257	▼103.0	▲4,204	▼1.7	
1948	▲41,560	▼29,764	▲11,796	▲4.5	▼252	▼91.8	▲4,341	▼1.6	
1949	▼39,415	▲38,835	▲580	▲0.2	▲253	▲92.7	▲4,523	▲1.7	
1950	▲39,443	▲42,562	▼-3,119	▼-1.1	▲257	▼85.7	▲4,812	▼1.6	
1951	▲51,616	▲45,514	▲6,102	▲1.9	▼255	▼73.6	4,665	▼1.3	
1952	▲66,167	▲67,686	▼-1,519	▼-0.4	▲259	▼70.5	▲4,701	1.3	
1953	▲69,608	▲76,101	▼-6,493	▼-1.7	▲266	▼68.3	▲5,156	1.3	
1954	▲69,701	▼70,855	▼-1,154	▼-0.3	▲271	▲69.3	4,811	▼1.2	
1955	▼65,451	▼68,444	▼-2,993	▼-0.7	▲274	▼64.5	▲4,850	▼1.1	1.8
1956	▲74,587	70,640	▲3,947	▲0.9	▼273	▼60.7	▲5,079	1.1	▲2.7
1957	▲79,990	▲76,578	▲3,412	▲0.7	▼272	▼57.4	▲5,354	1.1	▲3.1
1958	▼79,636	▲82,405	▼-2,769	▼-0.6	▲280	▲58.1	▲5,604	▲1.2	▼1.6
1959	▼79,249	▲92,098	▼-12,849	▼-2.5	▲288	▼55.1	▲5,762	▼1.1	▲3.3
1960	▲92,492	▲92,191	▲301	▲0.1	▲291	▼53.6	▲6,947	▲1.3	▼3.2
1961	▲94,388	▲97,723	▼-3,335	▼-0.6	▲293	▼52.0	6,716	▼1.2	▼2.0
1962	▲99,676	▲106,821	▼-7,146	▼-1.2	▲303	▼50.2	▲6,889	▼1.1	▼2.7
1963	▲106,560	▲111,316	▼-4,756	▼-0.8	▲310	▼48.7	▲7,740	▲1.2	▲3.2
1964	▲112,613	▲118,528	▼-5,915	▼-0.9	▲316	▼46.2	▲8,199	1.2	▲3.5
1965	▲116,817	118,228	▼-1,411	▼-0.2	▲322	▼43.4	▲8,591	1.2	▲4.1
1966	▲130,835	▲134,532	▼-3,698	▼-0.5	▲329	▼40.4	▲9,386	1.2	▲5.1
1967	▲148,822	▲157,464	▼-8,643	▼-1.0	▲340	▼39.6	▲10,268	1.2	▼4.2
1968	▲152,973	▲178,134	▼-25,161	▼-2.8	▲369	▼39.2	▲11,090	1.2	▲5.7
1969	▲186,882	▲183,640	▲3,242	▲0.3	▼366	▼35.9	▲12,699	1.2	▲8.2
1970	▲192,807	▲195,649	▼-2,842	▼-0.3	▲381	▼35.5	▲14,380	▲1.3	▼7.2
1971	▼187,139	▲210,172	▼-23,033	▼-2.1	▲408	▼35.0	▲14,841	1.3	▼4.7
1972	▲207,309	▲230,681	▼-23,373	▼-1.9	▲436	▼34.1	▲15,478	▼1.2	▼4.4
1973	▲230,799	▲245,707	▼-14,908	▼-1.1	▲466	▼32.7	▲17,349	1.2	▲8.7
1974	▲263,224	▲269,359	▼-6,135	▼-0.4	▲484	▼31.3	▲21,449	▲1.4	▲10.5
1975	▲279,090	▲332,332	▼-53,242	▼-3.3	▲542	▲32.2	▲23,244	1.4	▼5.8
1976	▲298,060	▲371,792	▼-73,732	▼-4.1	▲629	▲33.6	▲26,727	1.4	▼5.1
1977	▲355,559	▲409,218	▼-53,659	▼-2.7	▲706	▲33.9	▲29,901	▲1.5	▲5.5
1978	▲399,561	▲458,746	▼-59,185	▼-2.6	▲777	▼33.0	▲35,458	▲1.6	▲7.9
1979	▲463,302	▲504,028	▼-40,726	▼-1.6	▲830	▼31.6	▲42,633	▲1.8	▲11.2
1980	▲517,112	▲590,941	▼-73,830	▼-2.6	▲909	▲31.8	▲52,533	▲2.1	▲13.4
1981	▲599,272	▲678,241	▼-78,968	▼-2.5	▲995	▼31.0	▲68,766	▲2.5	▲16.4
1982	▲617,766	▲745,743	▼-127,977	▼-3.9	▲1,137	▲34.0	▲85,032	2.5	▼12.2
1983	▼600,562	▲808,364	▼-207,802	▼-5.9	▲1,372	▲37.7	▲89,808	▲2.8	▼9.1
1984	▲666,438	▲851,805	▼-185,367	▼-4.7	▲1,565	▲38.8	▲111,102	▲3.0	▲10.2
1985	▲734,037	▲946,344	▼-212,308	▼-5.0	▲1,817	▲41.9	▲129,478	3.0	▼8.1
1986	▲769,155	▲990,382	▼-221,227	▼-4.9	▲2,121	▲46.3	▲136,017	▼2.9	▼6.8
1987	▲854,287	▲1,004,017	▼-149,730	▼-3.1	▲2,346	▲48.3	▲138,611	2.9	▼6.7
1988	▲909,238	▲1,064,416	▼-155,178	▼-3.0	▲2,601	▲49.7	▲151,803	▲3.0	▲7.6
1989	▲991,104	▲1,143,743	▼-152,639	▼-2.7	▲2,868	▲50.8	▲168,981	▲3.1	▲9.2
1990	▲1,031,958	▲1,252,993	▼-221,036	▼-3.7	▲3,206	▲53.8	▲184,347	▲3.2	▼8.1
1991	▲1,054,988	▲1,324,226	▼-269,238	▼-4.4	▲3,598	▲58.4	▲194,448	▼3.1	▼5.7
1992	▲1,091,208	▲1,381,529	▼-290,321	▼-4.5	▲4,002	▲61.4	▲199,344	▼2.9	▼3.5
1993	▲1,154,334	▲1,409,386	▼-255,051	▼-3.8	▲4,351	▲63.4	▲198,713	▼2.8	▼3.0
1994	▲1,258,566	▲1,461,752	▼-203,186	▼-2.8	▲4,643	▲63.7	▲202,932	▲3.0	▲4.2
1995	▲1,351,790	▲1,515,742	▼-163,952	▼-2.2	▲4,921	▲64.4	▲232,134	3.0	▲5.8
1996	▲1,453,053	▲1,560,484	▼-107,431	▼-1.4	▲5,182	▼64.2	▲241,053	▼2.8	▼5.3
1997	▲1,579,232	▲1,601,116	▼-21,884	▼-0.3	▲5,369	▼62.6	▲243,984	▼2.7	▲5.5
1998	▲1,721,728	▲1,652,458	▲69,270	▲0.8	▲5,478	▼60.4	▼241,118	▼2.4	▼5.4
1999	▲1,827,452	▲1,701,842	▲125,610	▲1.3	▲5,606	▼58.2	▼229,755	▼2.2	▼5.0
2000	▲2,025,191	▲1,788,950	▲236,241	▲2.3	▲5,629	▼54.9	▼222,949	▼1.9	▲6.2
2001	▼1,991,082	▲1,862,846	▲128,236	▲1.2	▲5,770	▼54.5	▼206,167	▼1.6	▼3.9
2002	▼1,853,136	▲2,010,894	▼-157,758	▼-1.5	▲6,198	▲56.7	▼170,949	▼1.3	▼1.7
2003	▼1,782,314	▲2,159,899	▼-377,585	▼-3.3	▲6,760	▲59.0	▼153,073	1.3	▼1.1
2004	▲1,880,114	▲2,292,841	▼-412,727	▼-3.4	▲7,355	▲60.2	▲160,245	▲1.4	▲1.4
2005	▲2,153,611	▲2,471,957	▼-318,346	▼-2.5	▲7,905	▲60.6	▲183,986	▲1.6	▲3.2
2006	▲2,406,869	▲2,655,050	▼-248,181	▼-1.8	▲8,451	▲61.2	▲226,603	1.6	▲5.0
2007	▲2,567,985	▲2,728,686	▼-160,701	▼-1.1	▲8,951	▲61.8	▲237,109	▲1.7	▲5.0
2008	▼2,523,991	▲2,982,544	▼-458,553	▼-3.1	▲9,986	▲67.6	▲252,757	▼1.3	▼1.9
2009	▼2,104,989	▲3,517,677	▼-1,412,688	▼-9.8	▲11,876	▲82.0	▼186,902	1.3	▼0.2
2010	▲2,162,706	▼3,457,079	▼-1,294,373	▼-8.7	▲13,529	▲89.9	▼196,194	▲1.5	0.2
2011	▲2,303,466	▲3,603,065	▼-1,299,599	▼-8.4	▲14,764	▲94.6	▲229,962	▼1.4	▼0.1
2012	▲2,449,990	▼3,526,563	▼-1,076,573	▼-6.7	▲16,051	▲98.8	▼220,408	▼1.3	0.1
2013	▲2,775,106	▼3,454,881	▼-679,775	▼-4.1	▲16,719	▲99.0	▲220,885	1.3	0.1
2014	▲3,021,491	▲3,506,284	▼-484,793	▼-2.8	▲17,795	▲101.1	▲228,956	▼1.2	0.1
2015	▲3,249,890	▲3,691,850	▼-441,960	▼-2.4	▲18,120	▼99.0	▼223,181	▲1.3	0.1
2016	▲3,267,965	▲3,852,615	▼-584,650	▼-3.1	▲19,540	▲103.9	▲240,033	1.3	▲0.4
2017	▲3,316,184	▲3,981,634	▼-665,450	▼-3.4	▲20,206	▼103.0	▲262,551	▲1.6	▲1.0
2018	▲3,329,907	▲4,108,981	▼-779,074	▼-3.8	▲21,462	▲103.9	▲324,975	▲1.7	▲1.8
2019	▲3,463,364	▲4,446,952	▼-983,588	▼-4.6	▲22,670	▲105.2	▲375,158	▼1.6	▲2.2
2020	▼3,421,164	▲6,553,620	▼-3,132,456	▼-14.7	▲26,903	▲126.0	▼345,470	▼1.5	▼0.4
2021	▲4,047,111	▲6,822,461	▼-2,775,350	▼-12.1	▲28,386	▼119.9	▲352,338	▲1.8	▼0.1
2022	▲4,897,339	▼6,273,259	▼-1,375,920	▼-5.4	▲30,839	▼118.4	▲475,887	▲2.4	▲1.7
2023	▼4,440,947	▲6,134,672	▼-1,693,725	▼-6.2	▲32,989	▲118.6	▲659,182	▲2.4	▲5.0
2024	▲4,919,884	▲6,735,261	▼-1,815,377	▼-6.3	▲35,231	▲120.2	▲879,879	▲3.0	▲5.1
2025	▲5,236,421	▲7,011,105	▼-1,774,684	▼-5.9	▲37,375	▲121.5	▲970,065	▲3.2	▼4.2

== External transaction statistics ==
The following table shows the development of the different important indicators of external economic transactions, including international trade. Green and red arrows in the table are showing decreasing/increasing values or positive/negative values

Year	Total Exports (billion $)	Total Imports (billion $)	Trade balance (billion $)	Current account balance (billion $)	FDI net inflows (billion $)	FDI net ouflows (billion $)	Net international investment position (billion $)
1929	5.9	5.6	▲0.4				
1930	▼4.4	▼4.1	▲0.3				
1931	▼2.9	▼2.9	▲0.0				
1932	▼2.0	▼1.9	▲0.0				
1933	2.0	1.9	▲0.1				
1934	▲2.6	▲2.2	▲0.3				
1935	▲2.8	▲3.0	▼-0.2				
1936	▲3.0	▲3.2	▼-0.1				
1937	▲4.0	▲4.0	▲0.1				
1938	▼3.8	▼2.8	▲1.0				
1939	▲4.0	▲3.1	▲0.8				
1940	▲4.9	▲3.4	▲1.5				
1941	▲5.5	▲4.4	▲1.0				
1942	▼4.4	▼4.6	▼-0.3				
1943	▼4.0	▲6.3	▼-2.2				
1944	▲4.9	▲6.9	▼-2.0				
1945	▲6.8	▲7.5	▼-0.8				
1946	▲14.2	▼7.0	▲7.2				
1947	▲18.7	▲7.9	▲10.8				
1948	▼15.5	▲10.1	▲5.5				
1949	▼14.5	▼9.2	▲5.2				
1950	▼12.4	▲11.6	▲0.7				
1951	▲17.1	▲14.6	▲2.5				
1952	▼16.5	▲15.3	▲1.2				
1953	▼15.3	▲16.0	▼-0.7				
1954	▲15.8	▼15.4	▲0.4				
1955	▲17.7	▲17.2	▲0.5				
1956	▲21.3	▲18.9	▲2.4				
1957	▲24.0	▲19.9	▲4.1				
1958	▼20.6	▲20.0	▲0.5				
1959	▲22.7	▲22.3	▲0.4				
1960	▲27.0	▲22.8	▲4.2				
1961	▲27.6	▼22.7	▲4.9				
1962	▲29.1	▲25.0	▲4.1				
1963	▲31.1	▲26.1	▲4.9				
1964	▲35.0	▲28.1	▲6.9				
1965	▲37.1	▲31.5	▲5.6				
1966	▲40.9	▲37.1	▲3.9				
1967	▲43.5	▲39.9	▲3.6				
1968	▲47.9	▲46.6	▲1.4				
1969	▲51.9	▲50.5	▲1.4				
1970	▲59.7	▲55.8	▲3.9		1.2	6.9	
1971	▲63.0	▲62.3	▲0.6		▼0.8	▼5.6	
1972	▲70.8	▲74.2	▼-3.4		▲1.3	▲7.3	
1973	▲95.3	▲91.2	▲4.1		▲1.9	▲9.3	
1974	▲126.7	▲127.5	▼-0.8		▲3.5	▼5.2	
1975	▲138.7	▼122.7	▲16.0		▼2.3	▲13.7	
1976	▲149.5	▲151.1	▼-1.6		▲2.9	▼11.3	▲80.5
1977	▲159.3	▲182.4	▼-23.1		2.9	11.3	▲98.6
1978	▲186.9	▲212.3	▼-25.4		▲5.5	▲14.4	▲128.3
1979	▲230.1	▲252.7	▼-22.5		▲8.1	▲24.7	▲232.3
1980	▲280.8	▲293.8	▼-13.1		▲16.7	▼19.0	▲296.9
1981	▲305.2	▲317.8	▼-12.5		▲25.7	▼10.1	▲227.0
1982	▼283.2	▼303.2	▼-20.0		▼21.2	▼7.8	▲238.4
1983	▼277.0	▲328.6	▼-51.6		▼11.5	▲8.8	▲261.5
1984	▲302.4	▲405.1	▼-102.7		▲25.2	▲12.8	▲140.1
1985	▲303.2	▲417.2	▼-114.0		▼9.6	▼3.7	▲104.3
1986	▲321.0	▲452.9	▼-131.9		▲30.9	▲19.5	▲109.2
1987	▲363.9	▲508.7	▼-144.8		▲63.2	▲39.8	▲59.6
1988	▲444.6	▲554.0	▼-109.4		▼56.9	▼21.7	▲21.5
1989	▲504.3	▲591.0	▼-86.7		▲75.7	▲51.0	▼-33.7
1990	▲551.9	▲629.7	▼-77.9		▼71.2	▲59.9	▼-149.5
1991	▲594.9	▼623.5	▼-28.6		▼34.5	▼49.3	▼-243.3
1992	▲633.1	▲667.8	▼-34.7		▼30.3	▲58.8	▼-432.1
1993	▲654.8	▲720.0	▼-65.2		▲50.2	▲82.8	▼-121.8
1994	▲720.9	▲813.4	▼-92.5		▲55.9	▲90.0	▼-110.3
1995	▲812.8	▲902.6	▼-89.8		▲69.1	▲110.1	▼-277.6
1996	▲867.6	▲964.0	▼-96.4		▲97.8	▼103.0	▼-328.3
1997	▲953.8	▲1,055.8	▼-102.0		▲122.1	▲121.4	▼-788.2
1998	▼953.0	▲1,115.7	▼-162.7		▲211.2	▲174.8	▼-1,033.8
1999	▲992.9	▲1,252.5	▼-259.6	▼-286.6	▲312.4	▲247.8	▼-1,002.3
2000	▲1,096.1	▲1,477.2	▼-381.1	▼-401.9	▲349.1	▼186.4	▼-1,536.2
2001	▼1,026.8	▼1,403.6	▼-376.7	▼-394.1	▲172.5	▼146.0	▼-2,294.5
2002	▼998.0	▲1,437.7	▼-439.7	▼-456.1	▼111.0	▲179.0	▼-2,410.4
2003	▲1,035.2	▲1,557.1	▼-522.0	▼-522.3	▲117.1	▲195.2	▼-2,292.4
2004	▲1,176.4	▲1,810.5	▼-634.1	▼-635.9	▲213.6	▲374.0	▼-2,362.8
2005	▲1,301.6	▲2,041.5	▼-739.9	▼-749.2	▼142.3	▼52.6	▼-1,857.2
2006	▲1,470.2	▲2,256.6	▼-786.5	▼-816.6	▲298.5	▲283.8	▼-1,807.8
2007	▲1,659.3	▲2,395.2	▼-735.9	▼-736.6	▲346.6	▲523.9	▼-1,278.8
2008	▲1,835.3	▲2,576.2	▼-740.9	▼-696.5	▼341.1	▼343.6	▼-3,994.6
2009	▼1,582.8	▼2,001.9	▼-419.2	▼-379.7	▼161.1	▼312.6	▼-2,626.9
2010	▲1,857.2	▲2,389.6	▼-532.3	▼-432.0	▲264.0	▲349.8	▼-2,511.1
2011	▲2,115.9	▲2,695.5	▼-579.6	▼-455.3	▼263.4	▲436.6	▼-4,454.6
2012	▲2,217.7	▲2,769.3	▼-551.6	▼-418.2	▼250.3	▼377.2	▼-4,569.5
2013	▲2,287.9	▼2,766.4	▼-478.5	▼-339.5	▲288.1	▲392.8	▼-5,443.6
2014	▲2,378.5	▲2,887.4	▼-508.9	▼-370.1	▼251.9	▼387.6	▼-7,021.2
2015	▼2,270.6	▼2,794.9	▼-524.3	▼-408.5	▲511.4	▼301.1	▼-7,590.5
2016	▼2,235.6	▼2,738.8	▼-503.3	▼-396.2	▼474.3	▼299.8	▼-8,258.4
2017	▲2,388.3	▲2,931.6	▼-543.3	▼-367.6	▼380.8	▲409.4	▼-7,830.7
2018	▲2,538.1	▲3,131.2	▼-593.1	▼-439.8	▼214.7	▼-130.7	▼-9,795.8
2019	▲2,539.4	▼3,116.7	▼-577.3	▼-441.8	▲316.0	▲114.9	▼-11,666.4
2020	▼2,151.1	▼2,777.3	▼-626.2	▼-601.2	▼137.0	▲282.3	▼-11,894.3
2021	▲2,555.4	▲3,415.5	▼-860.0	▼-868.0	▲475.8	▲342.0	▼-15,358.0
2022	▲3,017.4	▲3,976.3	▼-958.9	▼-1,012.1	▼409.0	▲388.5	▼-14,226.7
2023	▲3,052.5	▼3,849.8	▼-797.3	▼-905.4	▼348.8	▲454.1	▼-17,123.6
2024	▲3,219.3	▲4,100.7	▼-881.5	▼-1,198.6	▼297.0	▼218.9	▼-22,127.8
2025	▲3,341.1	▲4,262.3	▼-921.1	▼-1,177.1	▲307.0	▲389.6	▼-21,873.6

== Private sector business statistics ==
The following table shows the development of the different important indicators of the private sector, including corporate profits, bankruptcies and domestic net investment. Green and red arrows in the table are showing decreasing/increasing values or positive/negative values

Year	Total business sales (billion $)	Corporate profits (billion $)	Net investment (billion $)	Business Applications	Number of bankruptcies	Market capitalization (in billion $)
1929		10.7				
1930		▼4.4				
1931		▼0.6				
1932		▼-1.3				
1933		▲1.8				
1934		▲3.2				
1935		▲4.2				
1936		▲7.0				
1937		▲7.4				
1938		▼4.3				
1939		▲7.5				
1940		▲10.4				
1941		▲18.4				
1942		▲22.1				
1943		▲25.5				
1944		▲24.4				
1945		▼20.1				
1946		▲24.9				
1947		▲31.7				
1948		▲35.2				
1949		▼28.9				
1950		▲42.5				
1951		▲43.6				
1952		▼39.4				
1953		▲41.4				
1954		▼38.8				
1955		▲49.1				
1956		▲49.8				
1957		▼48.1				
1958		▼42.5				
1959		▲53.2				
1960		▼50.7	20.7			
1961		▼50.6	▼20.2			
1962		▲55.4	▲27.3			
1963		▲60.3	▲29.6			
1964		▲67.0	▲34.1			
1965		▲78.4	▲46.6			
1966		▲85.9	▲57.4			
1967		▼82.8	▼50.1			
1968		▲92.3	▲54.1			
1969		▼90.1	▲60.9			
1970		▼79.2	▼50.8			
1971		▼91.4	▲58.7			
1972		▲106.4	▲70.8			
1973		▲131.2	▲92.1			
1974		▲144.1	▼86.7			
1975		▼140.1	▼45.2			703.8
1976		▲179.7	▲78.1			▲883.1
1977		▲209.4	▲106.4			▼834.2
1978		▲247.5	▲146.3			▲861.9
1979		▲266.8	▲172.9			▲993.5
1980		▼246.9	▼140.4			▲1,359.8
1981		▼245.3	▲200.4			▼1,263.6
1982		▼197.6	▼123.3			▲1,456.8
1983		▲227.0	▼122.1			▲1,809.0
1984		▼261.1	▲259.0			▼1,602.1
1985		▼250.1	▼234.1			▲2,300.8
1986		▲225.9	▼195.9			▲2,537.9
1987		▲287.6	▼192.1			▼2,531.7
1988		▲333.2	▼190.1			▲2,779.9
1989		▲326.7	▲217.4			▲3,382.2
1990		▲329.6	▼190.5			▼3,093.4
1991		▲349.0	▼123.2			▲4,159.6
1992	6,482.4	▲393.6	▲141.6			▲4,545.8
1993	▲6,806.3	▲435.2	▲183.5			▲5,251.0
1994	▲7,318.2	▲533.1	▲263.7			▼5,137.7
1995	▲7,856.3	▲602.8	▲284.1			▲6,952.0
1996	▲8,243.1	▲650.8	▲322.5			▲8,480.5
1997	▲8,681.3	▲709.5	▲411.5			▲10,770.1
1998	▲8,908.7	▼652.0	▲446.4			▲12,922.6
1999	▲9,434.1	▲676.0	▲494.6			▲14,777.4
2000	▲10,006.4	▼640.8	▲536.9		35,472	▲15,107.8
2001	▼9,817.9	▼548.7	▼341.4		▲40,099	▼13,983.7
2002	▲9,878.8	▲650.1	▼256.8		▼38,540	▼11,054.4
2003	▲10,256.4	▲831.7	▼253.6		▼35,037	▲14,266.3
2004	▲11,112.0	▲1,093.4	▲348.0		▼34,317	▲16,323.7
2005	▲12,069.9	▲1,480.5	▲415.6	2,509,448	▲39,201	▲17,000.9
2006	▲12,828.4	▲1,653.9	▲490.1	▲2,635,772	▼19,695	▲19,568.9
2007	▲13,538.1	▼1,476.4	▲506.4	▲2,655,554	▲28,322	▲19,922.2
2008	▲13,929.3	▼1,048.6	▼376.6	▼2,523,785	▲43,562	▼11,590.3
2009	▼11,866.9	▲1,156.9	▼-68.9	▼2,430,703	▲60,827	▲15,077.2
2010	▲13,068.5	▲1,492.9	▲172.3	▲2,499,850	▼56,282	▲17,283.5
2011	▲14,482.5	▼1,457.6	▲269.4	▲2,575,423	▼47,806	▼15,640.8
2012	▲15,210.5	▲1,810.0	▲427.1	▲2,576,992	▼40,075	▲18,668.3
2013	▲15,674.6	▲1,821.3	▲489.4	▲2,611,992	▼33,212	▲24,034.9
2014	▲16,153.3	▲1,949.4	▲585.6	▲2,667,717	▼26,983	▲26,330.6
2015	▼15,638.0	▼1,842.3	▲647.9	▲2,823,725	▼24,735	▼25,067.5
2016	▼15,547.1	▼1,820.0	▼516.8	▲2,976,271	▼24,114	▲27,352.2
2017	▲16,290.0	▼1,796.2	▲560.4	▲3,196,934	▼23,157	▲32,120.7
2018	▲17,249.3	▲1,797.0	▲664.2	▲3,499,222	▼22,232	▼30,436.3
2019	▲17,219.7	▲1,842.5	▲693.0	▲3,517,492	▲22,780	▲34,085.7
2020	▼16,580.8	▲2,078.2	▼389.3	▲4,380,443	▼21,655	▲41,569.9
2021	▲19,601.2	▲2,950.2	▲544.9	▲5,409,643	▼14,347	▲48,548.5
2022	▲22,019.2	▲3,085.0	▲850.2	▼5,083,307	▼13,125	▼40,298.0
2023	▼20,361.9	▲3,203.9	▲878.5	▲5,480,290	▲18,926	▲48,979.4
2024	▲22,445.1	▲3,657.1	▲905.2	▼5,201,647		▲62,185.7
2025	▲23,001.9	▼3,655.0	▲947.0	▲5,671,836		▲68,937.8

== Labor statistics ==
The following table shows the development of the different important indicators of the US labor market, including employment and labor productivity. Green and red arrows in the table are showing decreasing/increasing values or positive/negative values

Year	Total population (thousands)	Labor force (thousands)	Labor force participation rate (in %)	Employed (thousands)	Employment rate (in %)	Unemployed (in thousands)	Unemployment rate (in %)	Labor productivity (2017=100)
1929	121,878						3.2	
1930	▲123,188						▲8.7	
1931	▲124,149						▲15.9	
1932	▲124,949						▲23.6	
1933	▲125,690						▲24.9	
1934	▲126,485						▼21.7	
1935	▲127,362						▼20.1	
1936	▲128,181						▼16.9	
1937	▲128,961						▼14.3	
1938	▲129,969						▲19.0	
1939	▲131,028						▼17.2	
1940	▲132,122						▼14.6	
1941	▲133,402						▼9.9	
1942	▲134,860						▼4.7	
1943	▲136,739						▼1.9	
1944	▲138,397						▼1.2	
1945	▲139,928						▲1.9	
1946	▲141,389						▲3.9	
1947	▲144,126						3.9	
1948	▲146,631						▼3.8	
1949	▲149,188						▲5.9	
1950	▲151,684						▼5.3	
1951	▲154,287						▼3.3	
1952	▲156,954						▼3.0	
1953	▲159,565	63,015	58.9	61,179	57.1	1,834	▼2.9	
1954	▲162,391	▲63,643	▼58.8	▼60,109	▼55.5	▲3,532	▲5.5	
1955	▲165,275	▲65,023	▲59.3	▲62,170	▲56.7	▼2,852	▼4.4	
1956	▲168,221	▲66,552	▲60.0	▲63,799	▲57.5	▼2,750	▼4.1	
1957	▲171,274	▲66,929	▼59.6	▲64,071	▼57.1	▲2,859	▲4.3	
1958	▲174,141	▲67,639	▼59.5	▼63,036	▼55.4	▲4,602	▲6.8	
1959	▲177,130	▲68,369	▼59.3	▲64,630	▲56.0	▼3,740	▼5.5	
1960	▲180,760	▲69,628	▲59.4	▲65,778	▲56.1	▲3,852	5.5	
1961	▲183,742	▲70,459	▼59.3	▼65,746	▼55.4	▲4,714	▲6.7	
1962	▲186,590	▲70,614	▼58.8	▲66,702	▲55.5	▼3,911	▼5.5	
1963	▲189,300	▲71,833	▼58.7	▲67,762	▼55.4	▲4,070	▲5.7	
1964	▲191,927	▲73,091	58.7	▲69,305	▲55.7	▼3,786	▼5.2	
1965	▲194,347	▲74,455	▲58.9	▲71,088	▲56.2	▼3,366	▼4.5	
1966	▲196,599	▲75,770	▲59.2	▲72,895	▲56.9	▼2,875	▼3.8	
1967	▲198,752	▲77,347	▲59.6	▲74,372	▲57.3	▲2,975	3.8	
1968	▲200,745	▲78,737	59.6	▲75,920	▲57.5	▼2,817	▼3.6	
1969	▲202,736	▲80,734	▲60.1	▲77,902	▲58.0	▲2,832	▼3.5	
1970	▲205,089	▲82,771	▲60.4	▲78,678	▼57.4	▲4,093	▲4.9	
1971	▲207,692	▲84,382	▼60.2	▲79,367	▼56.6	▲5,016	▲5.9	
1972	▲209,924	▲87,034	▲60.4	▲82,153	▲57.0	▼4,882	▼5.6	
1973	▲211,939	▲89,429	▲60.8	▲85,064	▲57.8	▼4,365	▼4.9	
1974	▲213,898	▲91,949	▲61.3	▲86,794	57.8	▲5,156	▲5.6	
1975	▲215,981	▲93,775	▼61.2	▲85,846	▼56.1	▲7,929	▲8.5	
1976	▲218,086	▲96,158	▲61.6	▲88,752	▲56.8	▼7,406	▼7.7	
1977	▲220,289	▲99,009	▲62.3	▲92,017	▲57.9	▼6,991	▼7.1	
1978	▲222,629	▲102,251	63.2	▲96,048	▲59.3	▼6,202	▼6.1	
1979	▲225,106	▲104,962	▲63.7	▲98,824	▲59.9	▼6,137	▼5.8	
1980	▲227,726	▲106,940	▲63.8	▲99,303	▼59.2	▲7,637	▲7.1	
1981	▲230,008	▲108,670	▲63.9	▲100,397	▼59.0	▲8,273	▲7.6	
1982	▲232,218	▲110,204	▲64.0	▼99,526	▼57.8	▲10,678	▲9.7	
1983	▲234,333	▲111,550	64.0	▲100,834	▲57.9	▼10,717	▼9.6	
1984	▲236,394	▲113,544	▲64.4	▲105,005	▲59.5	▼8,539	▼7.5	
1985	▲238,506	▲115,461	▲64.8	▲107,150	▲60.1	▼8,312	▼7.2	
1986	▲240,683	▲117,834	▲65.3	▲109,597	▲60.7	▼8,237	▼7.0	
1987	▲242,843	▲119,865	▲65.6	▲112,440	▲61.5	▼7,425	▼6.2	55.1
1988	▲245,061	▲121,669	▲65.9	▲114,968	▲62.3	▼6,701	▼5.5	▲56.0
1989	▲247,387	▲123,869	▲66.5	▲117,342	▲63.0	▼6,528	▼5.3	▲56.5
1990	▲250,181	▲125,840	66.5	▲118,793	▼62.8	▲7,047	▲5.6	▲57.4
1991	▲253,530	▲126,346	▼66.2	▼117,718	▼61.7	▲8,628	▲6.8	▲58.5
1992	▲256,922	▲128,105	▲66.4	▲118,492	▼61.5	▲9,613	▲7.5	▲61.1
1993	▲260,282	▲129,200	▼66.3	▲120,259	▲61.7	▼8,940	▼6.9	▲61.2
1994	▲263,455	▲131,056	▲66.6	▲123,060	▲62.5	▼7,996	▼6.1	▲61.6
1995	▲266,588	▲132,304	66.6	▲124,900	▲62.9	▼7,404	▼5.6	▲62.3
1996	▲269,714	▲133,943	▲66.8	▲126,708	▲63.2	▼7,236	▼5.4	▲63.6
1997	▲272,958	▲136,297	▲67.1	▲129,558	▲63.8	▼6,739	▼4.9	▲64.8
1998	▲276,154	▲137,673	67.1	▲131,463	▲64.1	▼6,210	▼4.5	▲67.0
1999	▲279,328	▲139,368	67.1	▲133,488	▲64.3	▼5,880	▼4.2	▲69.6
2000	▲282,398	▲142,583	67.1	▲136,891	▲64.4	▼5,692	▼4.0	▲71.7
2001	▲285,225	▲143,734	▼66.8	▲136,933	▼63.7	▲6,801	▲4.7	▲73.7
2002	▲287,955	▲144,863	▼66.6	▼136,485	▼62.7	▲8,378	▲5.8	▲76.9
2003	▲290,626	▲146,510	▼66.2	▲137,736	▼62.3	▲8,774	▲6.0	▲79.8
2004	▲293,262	▲147,401	▼66.0	▲139,252	▼62.3	▼8,149	▼5.5	▲82.1
2005	▲295,993	▲149,320	66.0	▲141,730	▲62.7	▼7,591	▼5.1	▲83.9
2006	▲298,818	▲151,428	▲66.2	▲144,427	▲63.1	▼7,001	▼4.6	▲84.8
2007	▲301,696	▲153,124	▼66.0	▲146,047	▼63.0	▲7,078	4.6	▲86.3
2008	▲304,543	▲154,287	66.0	▲145,362	▼62.2	▲8,924	▲5.8	▲87.6
2009	▲307,240	▼154,142	▼65.4	▼139,877	▼59.3	▲14,265	▲9.3	▲91.4
2010	▲309,839	▼153,889	▼64.7	▼139,064	▼58.5	▲14,825	▲9.6	▲94.4
2011	▲312,295	▼153,617	▼64.1	▲139,869	▼58.4	▼13,747	▼8.9	▼94.2
2012	▲314,725	▲154,975	▼63.7	▲142,469	▲58.6	▼12,506	▼8.1	▲95.0
2013	▲317,099	▲155,389	▼63.2	▲143,929	58.6	▼11,460	▼7.4	▲95.7
2014	▲319,601	▲155,922	▼62.9	▲146,305	▲59.0	▼9,617	▼6.2	▲96.6
2015	▲322,113	▲157,130	▼62.7	▲148,834	▲59.3	▼8,296	▼5.3	▲97.9
2016	▲324,609	▲159,187	▲62.8	▲151,436	▲59.7	▼7,751	▼4.9	▲98.7
2017	▲326,860	▲160,320	▲62.9	▲153,337	▲60.1	▼6,982	▼4.4	▲100.0
2018	▲328,794	▲162,075	62.9	▲155,761	▲60.4	▼6,314	▼3.9	▲101.4
2019	▲330,513	▲163,539	▲63.1	▲157,538	▲60.8	▼6,001	▼3.7	▲103.7
2020	▲331,840	▼160,742	▼61.7	▼147,795	▼56.8	▲12,947	▲8.1	▲109.4
2021	▲332,505	▲161,204	61.7	▲152,581	▲58.4	▼8,623	▼5.3	▲111.6
2022	▲334,372	▲164,287	▲62.2	▲158,291	▲60.0	▼5,996	▼3.6	▼109.9
2023	▲337,114	▲167,116	▲62.6	▲161,037	▲60.3	▲6,080	3.6	▲112.5
2024	▲340,212	▲168,106	62.6	▲161,346	▼60.1	▲6,761	▲4.0	▲115.9
2025	▲341,944	▲170,807	▼62.4	▲163,493	▼59.7	▲7,314	▲4.3	▲118.3

== Agricultural indicators ==
The following table shows the development of the different important indicators of US agriculture. Green and red arrows in the table are showing decreasing/increasing values or positive/negative values.

Years	Farm output (billion $)	Farm workers (thousands)	Cereal production (tons)	Fruit production (tons)	Vegetable production (tons)	Meat production (tons)	Food supply per capita (kcal)
1950	31.2						
1951	▲36.4						
1952	▼35.7						
1953	▼32.2	6,260					
1954	32.2	▼6,205					
1955	▼31.6	▲6,450					
1956	31.6	▼6,283					
1957	▲31.8	▼5,947					
1958	▲35.7	▼5,586					
1959	▼35.0	▼5,565					
1960	▲35.7	▼5,458					
1961	▲36.7	▼5,200	163,619,980	18,899,892	17,096,626	16,513,033	3,044
1962	▲38.1	▼4,944	▼162,455,780	▲19,908,002	▲18,019,448	▲16,589,528	▼3,018
1963	▲39.2	▼4,687	▲174,812,480	▼18,234,608	▼16,959,308	▲17,452,752	▼3,016
1964	▼37.7	▼4,523	▼160,937,070	▲18,249,632	▼16,941,024	▲18,545,968	▲3,082
1965	▲41.6	▼4,361	▲183,602,620	▲19,992,674	▲17,469,582	▼18,241,816	▼3,076
1966	▲44.6	▼3,979	▲184,444,880	▲20,410,398	▲17,768,968	▲19,077,204	▲3,110
1967	▼44.7	▼3,844	▲208,158,050	▲21,376,880	▲19,121,616	▲19,983,792	▲3,136
1968	▲45.5	▼3,817	▼202,538,420	▼19,530,580	▲21,082,192	▲20,347,980	▲3,159
1969	▲49.5	▼3,606	▲205,288,180	▲23,363,620	▼18,673,072	▲20,590,034	▲3,188
1970	▲51.8	▼3,463	▼186,860,750	▼22,322,940	▲18,973,780	▲21,330,296	▼3,174
1971	▲55.4	▼3,394	▲237,624,460	▲23,653,696	▲20,142,700	▲22,071,024	▲3,185
1972	▲63.4	▲3,484	▼228,117,870	▼21,608,664	▲20,558,786	▼21,961,512	▲3,188
1973	▲91.3	▼3,470	▲237,683,000	▲25,346,184	▼20,366,404	▼20,934,900	▼3,161
1974	▲92.0	▲3,515	▼204,617,500	▼24,783,260	▲22,186,720	▲22,330,672	▼3,150
1975	▲94.4	▼3,408	▲249,283,740	▲26,582,160	▲23,132,588	▼21,701,342	3,150
1976	▲96.1	▼3,331	▲258,200,100	▼26,576,328	▼22,358,060	▲23,588,288	▲3,285
1977	▲99.5	▼3,283	▲266,014,460	▲27,096,260	▲24,017,348	▲23,723,466	▼3,253
1978	▲117.6	▲3,387	▲276,602,530	▼26,646,152	▼23,950,392	▼23,497,032	▲3,269
1979	▲140.5	▼3,347	▲302,625,570	▼26,618,840	▲24,997,200	▲23,637,356	▲3,323
1980	▼137.8	▲3,364	▼269,883,970	▲30,667,352	▼23,233,940	▲24,455,198	▼3,278
1981	▲152.6	▲3,368	▲330,889,540	▼27,791,678	▼23,229,136	▲24,883,150	▲3,315
1982	▼147.0	▲3,401	▲333,103,740	▼27,064,406	▲25,452,944	▼24,222,124	▼3,285
1983	▼130.0	▼3,383	▼207,657,600	▲27,538,668	▼23,855,848	▲25,151,146	▲3,324
1984	▲154.9	▼3,321	▲314,749,500	▼25,111,010	▲25,590,760	▲25,417,452	▲3,369
1985	▼147.7	▼3,179	▲347,118,200	▼24,724,596	▲25,609,856	▲25,834,360	▲3,477
1986	▼139.2	▼3,163	▼315,331,200	▲24,987,272	▼24,931,472	▲26,283,504	▲3,448
1987	▲147.1	▲3,208	▼280,494,050	▲28,005,342	▲26,380,942	▲26,844,304	▲3,550
1988	▲153.7	▼3,169	▼206,528,100	▲28,285,304	▼25,634,796	▲27,808,250	▲3,559
1989	▲171.9	▲3,199	▲284,238,050	▲29,229,050	▲28,862,940	▲28,289,328	▼3,531
1990	▲179.9	▲3,223	▲312,410,600	▼26,327,030	▲29,762,520	▲28,634,662	▲3,583
1991	▼175.3	▲3,269	▼280,063,400	▲27,346,798	▲29,852,752	▲29,350,008	▲3,599
1992	▲182.6	▼3,247	▲353,025,150	▲29,598,900	▼29,748,296	▲30,665,134	3,599
1993	▼182.2	▼3,115	▼259,105,340	▲31,643,342	▲29,972,320	▲31,172,442	▲3,654
1994	▲197.5	▲3,409	▲355,934,900	▲31,804,144	▲34,466,250	▲32,229,068	▲3,704
1995	▼191.9	▲3,440	▼277,601,200	▲32,141,096	▼32,949,714	▲33,486,448	▼3,612
1996	▲215.8	▲3,443	▲335,780,130	▼31,921,702	▲33,204,014	▲34,270,504	▲3,617
1997	▲219.4	▼3,399	▲336,582,180	▲35,296,470	▲33,500,234	▲34,914,250	▲3,678
1998	▼207.8	▼3,378	▲349,425,760	▼34,473,708	▼32,258,476	▲35,874,200	▲3,687
1999	▼199.9	▼3,281	▼335,364,350	▲31,218,972	▲37,012,124	▲37,016,020	▲3,702
2000	▲204.3	▼2,464	▲342,631,520	▲35,713,530	▲37,477,820	▲37,565,212	▲3,784
2001	▲212.3	▼2,299	▼324,994,620	▼33,050,210	▼34,694,596	▲38,252,104	▼3,734
2002	▼202.4	▲2,311	▼297,143,460	▲33,282,500	▲36,843,188	▲38,715,588	▲3,808
2003	▲227.9	▼2,275	▲348,247,600	▼31,774,912	▼35,769,936	▲39,464,440	▼3,800
2004	▲263.2	▼2,232	▲389,023,780	▲33,013,670	▲37,761,910	▲39,805,480	▲3,829
2005	▼253.6	▼2,197	▼366,436,350	▼29,880,380	▼34,902,284	▼39,744,000	▲3,845
2006	▲256.2	▲2,206	▼338,336,800	▼28,972,844	▲35,133,100	▲40,131,500	▼3,798
2007	▲304.8	▼2,095	▲415,130,850	▼27,854,904	▲36,558,496	▲41,624,756	▼3,769
2008	▲327.9	▲2,168	▼402,399,940	▲30,636,408	▼34,876,076	▲42,883,180	▼3,712
2009	▼297.7	▼2,103	▲418,666,180	▼30,277,984	▲36,639,164	▼41,856,172	▼3,657
2010	▲320.9	▲2,206	▼401,126,340	▼29,156,900	▼34,723,852	▲41,952,750	▲3,729
2011	▲380.3	▲2,254	▼385,545,250	▲29,947,362	▼33,970,840	▲42,450,692	▼3,727
2012	▲404.2	▼2,186	▼356,210,100	▲29,980,306	▲35,260,076	▲42,622,316	▲3,765
2013	▲437.6	▼2,130	▲434,308,450	▲30,435,436	▼33,637,344	▲42,754,380	▼3,754
2014	▲442.2	▲2,237	▲442,849,100	▼28,600,144	▲35,662,548	▲42,825,420	▲3,742
2015	▼403.2	▲2,422	▼431,870,370	▼27,353,572	▼34,474,390	▲43,313,000	▲3,754
2016	▼379.8	▲2,460	▲503,466,140	▲27,690,094	▼34,135,076	▲44,668,812	▲3,777
2017	▲395.5	▼2,454	▼440,271,780	▲26,466,750	▼32,081,874	▲45,825,732	▲3,791
2018	▼395.1	▼2,425	▼439,710,820	▼24,375,294	▼31,731,880	▲46,858,456	▲3,824
2019	▼388.1	2,425	▼420,874,100	▲25,493,500	▼29,511,218	▲48,190,810	▲3,876
2020	▲389.5	▼2,349	▲433,259,140	▼23,887,258	▼29,222,040	▼47,044,350	▲3,892
2021	▲472.9	▼2,291	▲451,637,220	▼22,832,558	▲29,255,462	▲47,442,796	▲3,911
2022	▲576.7	▼2,290	▼408,899,970	▼21,346,636	▲29,415,320	▲47,753,588	▲3,937
2023	▼570.6	▼2,264	▲462,631,170	▲21,876,188	▲31,253,512	▼47,461,910	▲3,947
2024	▼550.9	▼2,254	▲454,987,900	▼21,720,098	▼28,382,076	▲47,793,756	
2025	▲578.3	▼2,225					

== Industrial indicators ==
The following table shows the development of the different important indicators of US industry and manufacturing. Green and red arrows in the table are showing decreasing/increasing values or positive/negative values.

Years	Industrial production index (2017=100)	Capacity utilization (in %)	Manufacturing employment (thousands)	Car production (units)	Steel production (thousand tons)	Oil production (in TWh)	Energy consumption (in TWh)	Energy use per capita (in KWh)	Electricity production (in TWh)
1929	7.6					1,606			
1930	▼6.3					▼1,432			
1931	▼5.2					▲1,357			
1932	▼4.1					▼1,252			
1933	▲4.8					▲1,425			
1934	▲5.3					▲1,430			
1935	▲6.1					▲1,566			
1936	▲7.2					▲1,728			
1937	▲7.8					▲2,010			
1938	▼6.2					▼1,909			
1939	▲7.6		9,949			▲1,988			
1940	▲8.8		▲10,847			▲2,127			
1941	▲11.1		▲12,876			▲2,204			
1942	▲12.7		▲15,288			▼2,179			
1943	▲15.5		▲16,526			▲2,366			
1944	▲16.6		▲15,659			▲2,637			
1945	▼14.3		▼12,528			▲2,693			
1946	▼12.3		▲14,301	3,100,820		▲2,725			
1947	▲13.8		▲14,428	▲4,795,587		▲2,919			
1948	▲14.4		▼14,086	▲5,220,755		▲3,175			
1949	▼13.6		▼13,062	▲6,243,834		▼2,895			
1950	▲15.8		▲14,782	▲8,005,859	87,848	▲3,102			
1951	▲17.1		▲15,045	▼6,757,014	▲95,436	▲3,533			
1952	▲17.8		▲15,973	▼5,561,796	▼84,521	▲3,599			
1953	▲19.3		▼15,581	▲7,349,123	▲101,251	▲3,705			
1954	▼18.2		▼14,967	▼6,536,729	▼80,115	▲3,905			
1955	▲20.5		▲15,859	▲9,204,049	▲106,173	▲3,905			
1956	▲21.4		▲15,957	▼6,918,758	▼104,522	▲4,114			
1957	▲21.7		▼15,332	▲7,220,431	▼102,253	▼4,113			
1958	▼20.3		▼14,877	▼5,121,269	▼77,342	▼3,849			
1959	▲22.8		▲15,573	▲6,723,588	▲84,773	▲4,046			
1960	▲23.3		▼14,947	▲7,905,119	▲90,067	▲4,047			
1961	▲23.4		▲15,309	▼6,652,938	▼88,917	▲4,121			
1962	▲25.4		▲15,520	▲8,197,311	▲89,202	▲4,206			
1963	▲26.9		▲15,712	▲9,108,776	▲99,120	▲4,326			
1964	▲28.7		▲16,176	▲9,307,860	▲115,281	▲4,380			
1965	▲31.6		▲17,051	▲11,137,830	▲119,260	▲4,974	14,050	71,812	
1966	▲34.3		▲17,998	▼10,396,299	▲121,655	▲5,286	▲14,856	▲74,932	
1967	▲35.1	87.0	▲18,025	▼9,023,736	▼115,406	▲5,631	▲15,336	▲76,411	
1968	▲37.0	▲87.3	▲18,410	▲10,820,410	▲119,262	▲5,848	▲16,276	▲80,175	
1969	▲38.7	▲87.4	▲18,485	▼10,205,911	▲128,151	▲5,947	▲17,087	▲83,231	
1970	▼37.5	▼81.3	▼17,309	▼8,283,949	▼119,307	▲6,204	▲17,716	▲85,255	
1971	▲38.0	▼79.6	▼17,202	▲10,671,654	▼109,264	▼6,116	▲18,066	▲85,852	
1972	▲41.6	▲84.7	▲18,158	▲11,310,708	▲120,874	▲6,139	▲18,988	▲89,211	
1973	▲45.0	▲88.3	▲18,820	▲12,681,513	▲136,802	▼5,985	▲19,824	▲92,203	
1974	▼44.9	▼85.0	▼17,693	▼10,071,042	▲132,195	▼5,715	▼19,280	▼88,817	
1975	▼40.9	▼75.7	▼17,140	▼8,986,513	▼105,816	▼5,463	▼18,777	▼85,689	
1976	▲44.1	▲79.9	▲17,719	▲11,497,596	▲116,120	▼5,326	▲19,872	▲89,851	
1977	▲47.5	▲83.4	▲18,531	▲12,702,782	▼113,700	▲5,382	▲20,528	▲91,948	
1978	▲50.1	▲85.1	▲19,334	▲12,899,202	▲124,313	▲5,631	▲20,874	▲92,610	
1979	▲51.6	▼84.9	▼19,301	▼11,479,993	▼123,688	▼5,547	▲21,102	▲92,727	
1980	▼50.3	▼80.7	▼18,640	▼8,009,841	▼101,456	▲5,585	▼20,286	▼88,254	
1981	▲51.0	▼79.7	▼18,223	▼7,942,916	▲109,614	▼5,568	▼19,711	▼84,889	
1982	▼48.3	▼73.7	▼16,690	▼6,985,595	▼67,656	▲5,591	▼18,791	▼80,104	
1983	▲49.6	▲74.9	▲17,551	▲9,224,821	▲76,762	▲5,617	▼18,689	▼78,863	
1984	▲54.1	▲80.5	▲18,023	▲10,924,781	▲83,940	▲5,770	▲19,715	▲82,367	
1985	▲54.7	▼79.3	▼17,693	▲11,652,743	▼80,067	▲5,800	▲19,766	▼81,783	2,657
1986	▲55.3	▼78.5	▼17,478	▼11,334,775	▼74,031	▼5,609	▲19,948	▼81,768	▲2,676
1987	▲58.2	▲81.1	▲17,809	▼10,924,686	▲80,876	▼5,434	▲20,724	▲84,189	▲2,772
1988	▲61.2	▲84.3	▲18,025	▲11,213,687	▲90,650	▼5,339	▲21,747	▲87,551	▲2,914
1989	▲61.7	▼83.7	▼17,881	▼10,874,032	▼88,852	▼4,990	▲22,217	▲88,627	▲3,155
1990	▲62.3	▼82.3	▼17,395	▼9,782,997	▲89,726	▼4,845	▲22,261	▼87,859	▲3,233
1991	▼61.4	▼79.8	▼16,916	▼8,810,521	▼79,738	▲4,918	▼22,251	▼86,760	▲3,271
1992	▲63.2	▲80.6	▼16,769	▲9,728,790	▲84,322	▼4,804	▲22,657	▲87,275	▲3,284
1993	▲65.3	▲81.4	▲16,815	▲10,897,666	▲88,793	▼4,617	▲23,087	▲87,907	▲3,405
1994	▲68.7	▲83.3	▲17,217	▲12,262,737	▲91,244	▼4,507	▲23,551	▲88,714	▲3,459
1995	▲71.9	▲83.8	▲17,231	▼11,985,457	▲95,191	▼4,461	▲23,958	▲89,329	▲3,567
1996	▲75.2	▼83.3	▲17,284	▼11,798,905	▲95,535	▼4,443	▲24,715	▲91,245	▲3,663
1997	▲80.6	▲84.0	▲17,588	▲12,130,575	▲98,485	▼4,419	▲24,880	▼90,979	▲3,716
1998	▲85.3	▼82.7	▼17,449	▼12,006,079	▲98,658	▼4,281	▲25,118	▼90,968	▲3,856
1999	▲89.0	▼81.8	▼17,280	▲13,024,978	▲97,427	▼4,101	▲25,591	▲91,795	▲3,936
2000	▲92.5	▼81.5	▼17,181	▼12,799,857	▲101,803	▼4,042	▲26,255	▲93,272	▼3,802
2001	▼89.7	▼76.2	▼15,711	▼11,424,689	▼90,104	▼4,007	▼25,759	▼90,611	▼3,728
2002	▲90.0	▼75.0	▼14,912	▲12,279,582	▲91,587	▼3,976	▲26,074	▲90,823	▲3,844
2003	▲91.1	▲76.1	▼14,300	▼12,114,971	▲93,677	▼3,868	▲26,147	▼90,189	▲3,869
2004	▲93.6	▲78.3	▼14,287	▼11,989,387	▲99,681	▼3,784	▲26,703	▲91,202	▲3,952
2005	▲96.7	▲80.3	▼14,193	▼11,946,653	▼94,897	▼3,594	▲26,718	▼90,349	▲4,035
2006	▲98.9	▲80.6	▼14,015	▼11,263,986	▲98,557	▼3,541	▼26,473	▼88,619	▲4,047
2007	▲101.5	▲80.8	▼13,746	▼10,780,729	▼98,102	▲3,547	▲26,929	▲89,216	▲4,143
2008	▼97.9	▼77.8	▼12,850	▼8,693,541	▼91,350	▲3,515	▼26,239	▼86,038	▲4,108
2009	▼86.8	▼68.5	▼11,475	▼5,731,397	▼59,400	▲3,752	▼24,885	▼80,790	▼3,940
2010	▲91.6	▲73.4	▲11,595	▲7,761,443	▲80,495	▲3,874	▲25,743	▲82,758	▲4,114
2011	▲94.5	▲76.1	▲11,802	▲8,653,560	▲86,247	▲4,029	▼25,378	▼80,796	▼4,089
2012	▲97.4	▲77.0	▲11,960	▲10,328,884	▲88,700	▲4,597	▼24,742	▼78,021	▼4,041
2013	▲99.3	▲77.3	▲12,083	▲11,045,902	▼86,900	▲5,217	▲25,405	▲79,364	▲4,056
2014	▲102.3	▲78.9	▲12,292	▲11,660,699	▲88,200	▲6,101	▲25,669	▲79,443	▲4,096
2015	▼100.9	▼77.3	▲12,362	▲12,100,095	▼78,800	▲6,595	▼25,425	▼77,959	▼4,084
2016	▼98.7	▼75.6	▼12,355	▲12,198,137	▼78,500	▼6,312	▼25,311	▼76,891	▲4,088
2017	▲100.0	▲76.8	▲12,533	▼11,189,985	▲81,600	▲6,677	▼25,290	▼76,128	▼4,052
2018	▲103.2	▲79.8	▲12,796	▲11,314,705	▲86,600	▲7,787	▲26,216	▲78,243	▲4,202
2019	▼102.4	▼78.6	▲12,798	▼10,880,019	▲87,800	▲8,734	▼25,984	▼76,923	▼4,158
2020	▼95.1	▼72.9	▼12,194	▼8,822,399	▼72,700	▼8,296	▼23,940	▼70,530	▼4,043
2021	▲99.3	▲77.7	▲12,575	▲9,167,214	▲85,800	▲8,326	▲25,211	▲74,114	▲4,154
2022	▲101.0	▲80.7	▲12,934	▲10,060,339	▼82,000	▲8,863	▲25,617	▲75,007	▲4,287
2023	▲100.8	▼79.0	▲12,960	▲10,611,555	▼80,700	▲9,620	▼25,323	▼73,725	▼4,249
2024	▼100.1	▼76.1	▼12,873	▼10,562,188	▼79,500	▲10,036	▲25,568	▲74,018	▲4,387
2025	▲101.2	▼75.9	▼12,580		▲81,900	▲10,350	▲26,064	▲75,051	▲4,520

== See also ==
- Economy of the United States
