= Henry Wise Wood High School =

High school in Calgary, Alberta, Canada

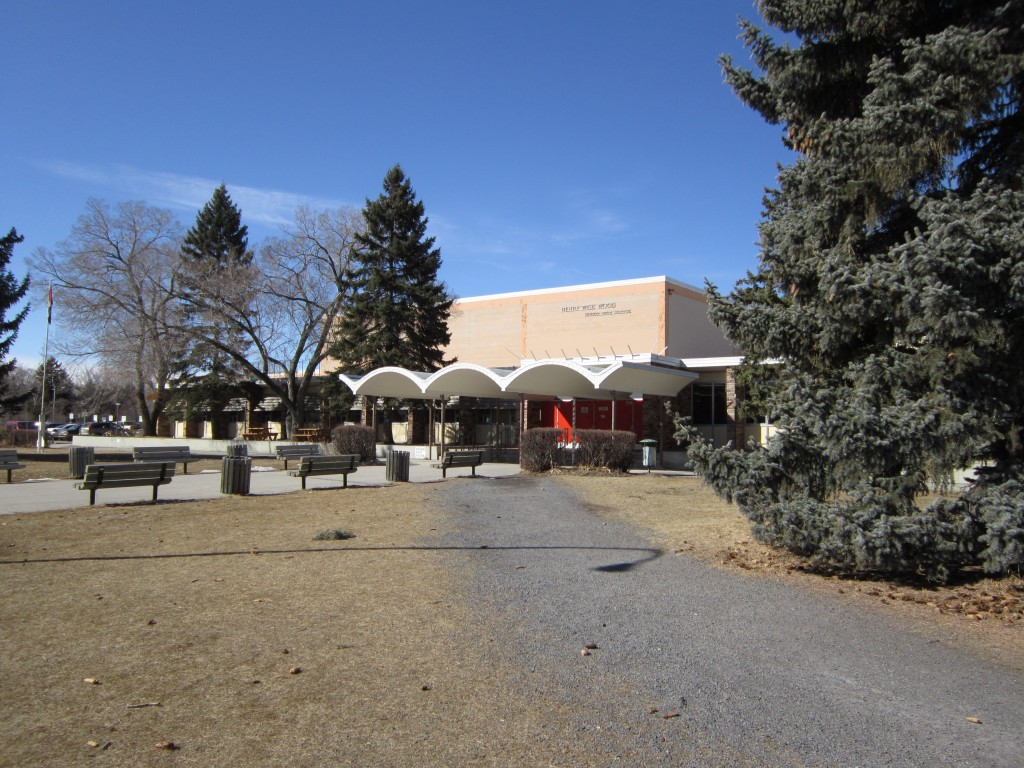
- Main entrance of Henry Wise Wood High School

Location
- 910 75 Ave SW; Calgary, Alberta, T2V 0S6; Canada; 50.98643°N 114.08455°W

Information
- Other name: Henry Wise Wood Senior High School
- School type: Public high school
- Motto: Home of Artists, Scholars, and Champions; Latin: Finis coronat opus (The end crowns the work)
- Founded: 1961; 65 years ago
- Status: Active
- School board: Calgary Board of Education
- Superintendent: Joanne Pitman
- Area trustee: Nancy Close
- School code: 000954 (International Baccalaureate)
- CEEB code: 820090
- Principal: Michelle Hornby
- Grades: 10–12
- Enrollment: 1820 (September 30, 2027)
  - Grade 10: 631
  - Grade 11: 582
  - Grade 12: 607
- Language: English
- Colour: Pantone 209
- Athletics: Yes
- Mascot: Maximus
- Team name: Warriors
- Communities served: Bayview, Braeside, Cedarbrae, Chinook Park, Eagle Ridge, Haysboro, Kelvin Grove, Kingsland, Mahogany, Oakridge, Ogden, Palliser, Pump Hill, Riverbend, Woodbine, Woodlands
- Feeder schools: Elboya, Fairview, Harold Panabaker, John Ware, Nickle, Robert Warren, Sherwood, Willow Park, Woodman
- Affiliation: International Baccalaureate
- Website: henrywisewood.cbe.ab.ca

Henry Wise Wood High School (HWW) or Henry Wise Wood Senior High School is a public high school located in the southwest quadrant of Calgary, Alberta, Canada.

The school was built in 1961 and is named after Henry Wise Wood, an American stockman and farmer who moved to Alberta in 1905, where, as a progressive agrarian activist, was instrumental in making the United Farmers of Alberta an active political movement. Wood is regarded as an influential individual in Canadian agricultural and farming history.

Academically, the school offers the International Baccalaureate Programme (IB), and the Gifted and Talented Education Program (GATE), in addition to the full range of academic programs standard to the province. The school is part of the Action for Bright Children Society. A unique option in the IB Programme that the school offers to students as an additional Group 3 subject is Philosophy 20/30 SL IB, which is made available bi-annually.

Henry Wise Wood has a music program that includes a symphonic band and jazz band.

On January 16, 2026, a 16 year old Henry Wise Wood student was stabbed at a bus stop near the vicinity of the school, and an 18 year old man, Brayen Cailou, was charged in relation to the incident.

== Athletics programs ==
Henry Wise Wood is noted for its football team, having won several city championships over the years. The school also has many other sports teams, including soccer, badminton, swimming, basketball, volleyball, rugby, and track.

Wise Wood features number of athletics programs and teams which include:

- Swimming
- Cross Country Running
- Curling
- Football
- Rugby
- Soccer
- Basketball
- Badminton
- Track and Field
- Volleyball
- Field Hockey

== Notable alumni ==
- John Davidson (born 1953), NHL goaltender, Foster Hewitt Memorial Award winner (2009)
- Linda Taylor, lawyer, UN administrator, IRB member
- Miles Gorrell (born 1955), CFL football player
- Mark Laurie (born 1955), photographer
- Marina Paperny, lawyer, jurist (Alberta Court of Queen's Bench, Alberta Court of Appeal)
- Nancy Southern (born 1956), business executive, equestrian
- Mike Vernon (born 1963), NHL goaltender, Hockey Hall of Fame (2023)
- Ari Taub (born 1971), Olympic Greco-Roman wrestler
- Pierre Poilievre (born 1979), Canadian member of Parliament, leader of the Conservative Party of Canada and the leader of the Official Opposition
- Dave Cohen (born 1985), musician, producer
- Evan Williams (born 1985), actor (Blonde)
- Spencer Wilson (born 1988), CFL football player
- Samuel Carson (born 2002), CFL football player
