= Dr. E.P. Scarlett High School =

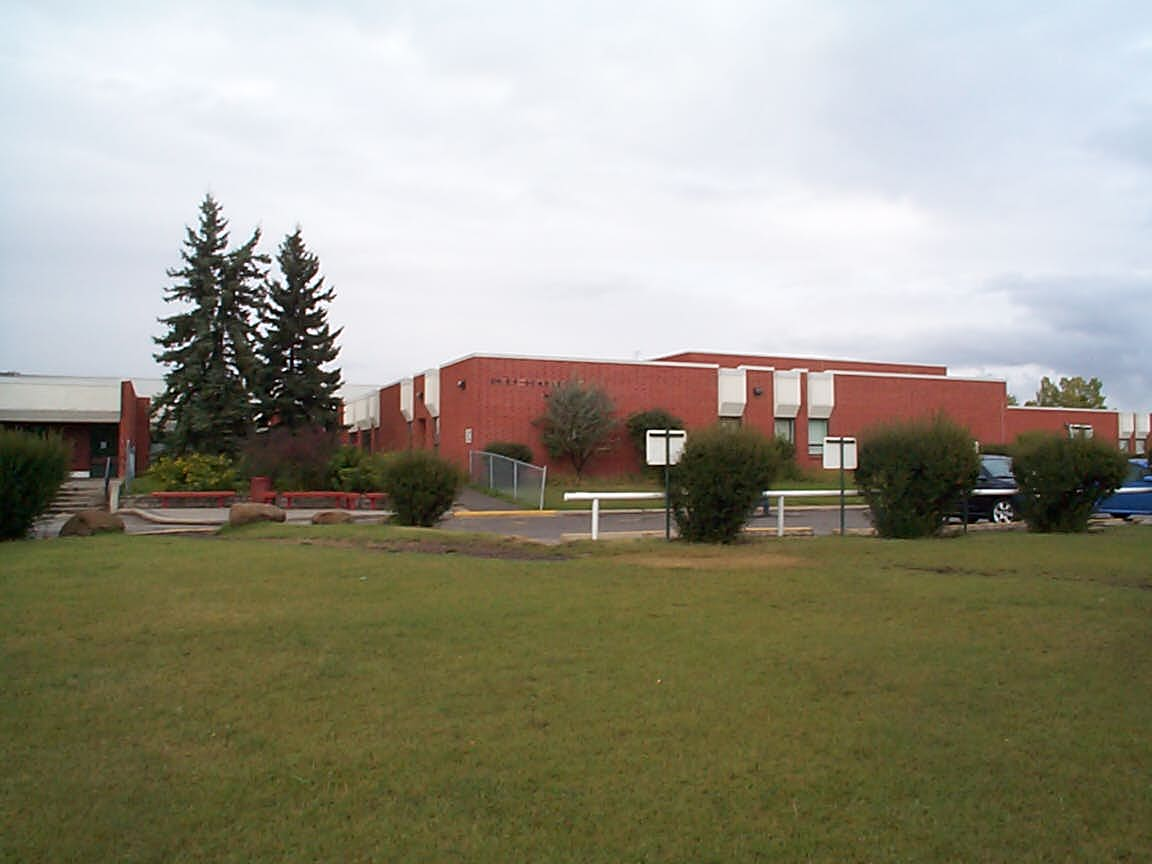

Location
- 220 Canterbury Drive SW; Calgary, Alberta, T2W 1H4; Canada; 50.947°N 114.086817°W

Information
- Type: Public
- Motto: A Place of Humane Learning
- Established: 1970
- School board: Calgary Board of Education
- Principal: Carma Cornea
- Employees: 79
- Grades: 10, 11, 12
- Enrollment: 1869 (2026-27)
  - Grade 10: 561
  - Grade 11: 541
  - Grade 12: 561
  - Advanced Placement (AP) Enrolment: 413
  - French Immersion enrolment: 298
- Schedule: Period 1 8:55-10-21; Period 2 10:25-11:51; Period 3 12:34-2:00; Period 4 2:04-3:30
- Campus type: Urban
- Colours: Red, White and Grey
- Athletics: Badminton, basketball, cross country, field hockey, football, rugby, soccer, swim and dive, track and field, volleyball, wrestling
- Mascot: Larry the Lancer
- Team name: Lancers
- Newspaper: Scarlett Fever
- Communities served: Lake Bonavista, Bonavista Downs, Canyon Meadows, Evergreen, Silverado, Auburn Bay, Southwood, Walden, Woodbine, Woodlands,
- Feeder schools: Elboya School, Fairview School, Harold Panabaker School, Nickle School, Robert Warren School, Woodman Junior High School, Willow Park School
- Social Media: https://www.instagram.com/epslancers/?hl=en
- Website: school.cbe.ab.ca/school/drepscarlett/Pages/default.aspx

Dr. E.P. Scarlett High School is a public senior high school located in Calgary, Alberta, Canada. The school was named after Earle Parkhill Scarlett, a Calgary physician, educator, scholar and writer. The school is run by the Calgary Board of Education. The school graduates around 500 Grade 12 students every year, with a 91% graduation rate. Scarlett is located on Elbow Drive and Canterbury Drive, and is one of few high schools servicing the deep south districts. Scarlett has the largest and most established AP program in the city and hosts French Immersion and Spanish bilingual programs.

== Academics ==
=== Advanced Placement ===
Dr. E.P. Scarlett High School offers one of the most established Advanced placement (AP) programs in the country. The AP program has been at the school since 1989, and as of the 2022–23 school year has 413 students enrolled in at least one AP course. To enrol in an AP class at Dr. E.P. Scarlett, the student must have high academic achievement in that course, with a teacher recommendation.

The school also offers French Language & Culture as a challenge exam for its French Immersion students.

=== French Immersion ===
Scarlett has a strong French Immersion program, offering -1 stream Études Sociales and Mathématiques, as well as French Language Arts (FLA). Scarlett also offers an AP Mathématiques Enrichment course. In the 2023 - 2024 school year, Dr. E.P Scarlett had 298 students enrolled in French Immersion.

== Music program ==
The Band program consists of the Concert Band, Symphonic Band, and auditioned Wind Ensemble, as well as auditioned Jazz 1, 2, and 3 Bands. All three bands have won gold awards at the Alberta International Band Festival numerous times under direction of Brown.

The Choir program has gained recognition from music festivals within Calgary, and across Canada, in addition to individual workshop leaders from around the continent. At one point, the choir program was made up of a variety of choirs, each specialising in a certain genre of music. This was later phased out in favour of one mass choir that did not have to limit itself to one genre or language. The Dr. E.P Scarlett Choir frequents the annual Choralfest festival in Calgary, where it has received much praise. The program is now made up of one concert choir.

Jazz 1 participates in an annual event at The Ironwood in Calgary, where students have the opportunity to play alongside legendary musicians such as Dick Oatts, Luis Bonilla, and Terell Stafford. All three jazz bands are auditioned.

The Music Department holds several annual public concerts a year, including Jazz on Canterbury, an annual jazz showcase held at the school for Scarlett and feeder schools, and Winds From The South at Jack Singer Concert Hall, an annual showcase of talent from Scarlett's music program, as well as a variety of feeder schools.

The program also frequents a number of music festivals, including both the Calgary and Edmonton extensions of AIBF, the annual Vic Lewis Band Festival in Canmore, Alberta; Con Brio in Whistler, British Columbia; and international festivals such as Heritage Festival and Festival Disney.

== Other programs ==
Some of their other program offerings include Dance, Film Studies, Sports Performance, Journalism, Sports Medicine, Environmental Science, Learning Strategies, and Theatre Production. The school is a member of the Action for Bright Children Society. Scarlett is also the only high school in Calgary to offer the Spanish Bilingual program.

== Notable alumni ==
- Derek Beaulieu, poet, editor
- Michael Connolly, Member of the Legislative Assembly of Alberta
- Brad Ference, retired NHL player who most recently played for the Calgary Flames
- Johnny Forzani, CFL player for the Calgary Stampeders
- Dany Heatley, former NHL player
- Hilary Howe Volleyball player, member of the Canada women's national volleyball team
- Bruce McCulloch, actor (The Kids in the Hall), comedian, writer, musician and film director
- Steven Ogg, actor, voiced Trevor Philips in Grand Theft Auto V
- Brent Peterson, former NHL player and coach
- Greg Peterson, CFL player for the Calgary Stampeders
- Larry Ryckman, Owner of the Calgary Stampeders football team and music executive
- Jillian Tamaki, Caldecott and Governor General's Award-winning author and illustrator
- Helen Upperton, Canadian Olympic Silver Medalist for Bobsledding
- Scaachi Koul, writer
