= Spencer Wilson =

Canadian football offensive lineman (born 1988)

No. 50
- Position: Offensive lineman

Personal information
- Born: April 7, 1988 (age 38); Toronto, Ontario, Canada
- Listed height: 6 ft 6 in (1.98 m)
- Listed weight: 303 lb (137 kg)

Career information
- High school: Henry Wise Wood

Career history
- 2011–2018: Calgary Stampeders
- 2019: Montreal Alouettes

Awards and highlights
- 2× Grey Cup champion (2014, 2018); 2× CFL All-Star (2015, 2016); 2× CFL West All-Star (2015, 2016)
- Stats at CFL.ca

Spencer Wilson (born April 7, 1988) is a Canadian former professional football offensive lineman who was on two Grey Cup championship teams, both with the Calgary Stampeders.

== Early career ==
Wilson attended Henry Wise Wood Senior High School where he played high school football for the Warriors.

Wilson first played football at the amateur level with the Okanagan Sun of the Canadian Junior Football League (CJFL) in 2006, when he won the "Top Rookie" team award. From 2008 to 2010, Wilson played for the Calgary Colts of the CJFL, where he won the Keith Evans Award for Most Valuable Lineman three times and won the Alan Mline Award for Most Valuable Player in 2009. Additionally, he was named a Prairie Football Conference all-star each year with the Colts.

== Professional career ==
On May 18, 2011, Wilson was signed by the Calgary Stampeders as an undrafted free agent. He spent most of the 2011 season on the Stampeders' practice squad, but was moved to the active roster near the end of the season to act as a reserve offensive lineman. He played in three regular season games and one post-season game in his rookie year. In 2012, Wilson played as both a left tackle and left guard while starting in 10 games due to several injuries at the offensive line positions. Wilson played in 12 regular season games and one post-season game in 2013 after the Stampeders again faced injury difficulties on the offensive line. In 2014, Wilson started in 16 regular season games while playing in all 18 at the right guard position. He also started in two post-season games, including the Grey Cup, where the Stampeders defeated the Hamilton Tiger-Cats 20–16.

Wilson was released by the Montreal Alouettes on January 14, 2020.
