= Braeside, Calgary =

Braeside
- Neighbourhood
- Location of Braeside in Calgary
- Coordinates: 50°57′14″N 114°06′20″W
- Country: Canada
- Province: Alberta
- City: Calgary
- Quadrant: SW
- Ward: 11
- Established: 1965

Government
  - Mayor: Jeromy Farkas
  - Administrative body: Calgary City Council
  - Councillor: Rob Ward (Communities First)
- Elevation: 1,095 m (3,593 ft)

Population (2010)
  - Total: 5,916
  - Average Income: $64,691
- Website: Braeside Community Association

Braeside is a residential neighbourhood in the southwest quadrant of Calgary, Alberta. It is located north of Anderson Road, south of Southland Drive, west of 14th Street SW and east of 24th Street SW.

== Demographics ==
In the City of Calgary's 2012 municipal census, Braeside had a population of 5,940 living in 2,544 dwellings, a -0.6% increase from its 2011 population of 5,978. With a land area of 2 km^{2} (0.77 sq mi), it had a population density of 3,000/km^{2} (7,700/sq mi) in 2012.

As of 2000, 20.5% of the residents were immigrants. A proportion of 10.6% of the buildings were condominiums or apartments, and 19.6% of the housing was used for renting.

Pop. Overtime
Year	Population
2014	5960
2015	6049
2016	5985
2017	5960
2018	5893
2019	5805
2021	5700

== Education ==
Braeside is served by the Braeside Elementary public school. A Junior High School, John Ware, is located immediately north of the community. CBE Students are served by Eugene Coste school in Haysboro if they want to attend a Spanish bilingual school. The nearest French immersion school is Chinook Park. The nearest high school is Henry Wise Wood. JCB.

== Crime ==
In the May 2023-May 2024, Braeside had a crime rate of 1.877/100, an increase from the data period before.

This puts it at this comparison to other Calgary communities: Saddle Ridge (1.358/100), Whitehorn (1.741/100), Braeside (1.877/100), Rundle (2.342/100), Brentwood (2.348/100), Acadia (2.542/100), Bowness (2.934/100), Shawnessy (3.296/100), Inglewood (3.438/100), Sunnyside (3.650/100), Marlborough (4.703/100), Southwood (5.147/100), Sunalta (5.307/100), Montgomery (5.483/100), Forest Lawn (6.528/100), Rosscarrock (7.049/100), Downtown Commercial Core (12.705/100), Downtown East Village (15.605/100), Manchester (43.368/100).

=== Historic incidents ===
On June 8, 2012, Graham Mark Sear was found dead in a silver Toyota 4Runner in an alley behind Braeside Shopping Centre plaza. Witnesses told police that they had seen two men assaulting someone inside a vehicle in a parking lot of 1990 Southland Drive SW. Police believe the incident to be a drug deal "gone wrong". In May 2013, police arrested Christopher Brian Richards on one count of first-degree murder. Later in November 2013, police had arrested Glen John MacIsaac on one count of first-degree murder related to the incident.

On the morning of July 4, 2013, local radio-star Bill Lee Powers and his wife Donna Lee Powers were found dead at their Braeside residence at 1700 110 Avenue SW. Soon after a man in distress was arrested at the intersection of 14 Street SW and Southland Drive SW. Derek Puffer was arrested on two counts of second-degree murder.

On March 9, 2014, two teenage boys were found with stab wounds outside of a home on 11400 Braniff Green SW. Juliano Vieira, a grade 11 student at Henry Wise Wood High School, died of his injuries on way to hospital following the incident. Roland Smith was arrested later on the same day following the incident.

On June 24, 2014, an unknown man had entered a home on 600 Brookpark Drive SW at around 4 AM before proceeding to enter the victims' bedroom. The victim would find the man standing on top of her, at which point he began sexual assaulting the woman. The victim managed to kick the man off of her before running to her parents' bedroom for help.

On March 11, 2021, police arrived near 10000 Brackenridge Road SW in Braeside after neighbours reported gunshots. The incident was described as a brazen daytime shooting by police and residents described five gunshots coming off from a regular gun followed by what had sounded like a machine gun going off.

On June 27, 2024, a house on 499 Bracewood Crescent SW was temporarily shut down on drug related charges. Prior to the shut down, the house had 20 different police calls and two people were found dead on the property from drug overdoses. The property comes as the fifth property shut down by Alberta Sheriffs in Southern Alberta in 2024.

== See also ==
- List of neighbourhoods in Calgary
