= Mark Laurie (photographer) =

Canadian photographer

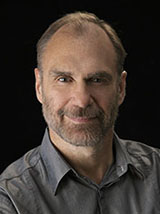
- Mark Laurie
- Born: Mark Keith Laurie; 7 February 1955; Didsbury, Alberta, Canada
- Education: Master of Photography Degree, Master of Photographic Arts (8th Bar)
- Occupations: Photographer, instructor, author
- Spouse: Jan Howells-Laurie
- Website: innerspiritphoto.com

Mark Keith Laurie (born 7 February 1955) is a Canadian photographer, specializing in female fine art photography and digital photography. He is also a teacher, speaker, author, and studio mentor.

Laurie's images have been displayed at Disney World's Epcot Center, Hungary's National Culture Center, the Calgary Stampede, London's International Hall of Fame, and the Czechoslovakia International Celebration of Women. Three of his female nude portraits are aboard the Voyager III time capsule.

== Early life and education ==
Laurie was born in Didsbury, Alberta, Canada, receiving his education at Henry Wise Wood Senior High School and Mount Royal College in Calgary. Laurie worked as a recreation director, and as a realtor before settling into what would become his career and passion: photography.

Laurie holds a Master of Photography Degree, Master of Photographic Arts (10th bar), Service of Photographic Arts, and the highest British award: a Fellow in the Society of Wedding and Portrait Photographers as well as a PPOC Fellowship.

In addition to his boudoir, nude, and glamour portfolios, Laurie does pre-natal and family photography, high-profile celebrity and charity events, and has also done commercial and wildlife shoots. He is the author and photographer of two fine art photography books, as well as a book of poetry.

== Career ==
In 1978, Laurie opened his first studio, Wizer Wizard Photography. His business partner and wife, Jan Howells-Laurie, trained and became the retouch artist.

In 1980, the partners created Inner Spirit Photography, incorporating it four years later. The studio specialized from the beginning in photographing women. Their mission statement was "to create images that express a woman’s inner and outer beauty and provide an experiential environment that enlarges the boldness of a woman’s soul." By 1984, the home-based Calgary studio was receiving a growing and significant amount of media coverage, including a 14-minute national news story on CBC on 12 June 1984.

In 1987, Laurie and his photography techniques were the subjects of a year-long clinical study, which observed how Laurie's work was notably different from mainstream portrait photography, and statistically how those differences resulted in more positive psychological and lifestyle benefits for his subjects. Among other things, the study discovered that his photography sessions were catalysts of change in his clients’ lives.

Through the 1980s, Laurie was a photographer of celebrities in southern Alberta. He was the official photographer for the 2010 Calgary Choice Awards.

== Personal life ==
Laurie continues to reside in Calgary, Alberta with his wife, Jan Howells-Laurie.

== Digital art photography ==
Laurie began crossover photographic art in 1984 with the blending of an airbrush environment painted onto photographic prints. By 1989, he was a pioneer in digital art photography. One image, The Defender, which was a mix of body paint, pre-Photoshop digital work and airbrush (a collaboration with an airbrush artist), is included in a collection of his work aboard the NASA Voyager III Time Capsule that launched in December 1990.

In July 2001, Laurie became a regular columnist for Focus, the national fine art photography magazine, writing instructional articles and reviews about digital photography techniques, products, and technology.

== Photography mentor and instructor ==
In 1984, Laurie joined the Professional Photographers Association of Canada and the local Alberta branch, and began teaching the same year out of province and internationally by 1985. He became an instructor, teaching courses and speaking at professional photography seminars and workshops.

In 1987, Laurie was the Host and Producer of the educational photographic how-to TV series Inner Spirit Photography. It ran on Calgary Cable 10 for a season of seven episodes.

Laurie was the headline speaker at the Canadian National Photographers convention in August 1992, was past president of several photography organizations including Professional Photographers of Canada and Calgary Photographic Society, and the founding editor of two photography magazines, Portfolio Magazine and InFocus, and the PPOC Loan Collection Book Series.

In 2003 Laurie released an instructional CD entitled The Art of Marketing of Female Portraiture, and in 2008 an instructional DVD entitled The Foundation Series: LIGHTING. His work and techniques have also been featured in several Norman Phillips photography books.

Laurie still teaches in Canada, England, and Italy, maintains a professional photographer mentorship program, and holds photography seminars and workshops.

He has served as a National and International Accredited Print Show Judge for over 30 years. He writes on professional topics for a variety of industry and online publications.

== Awards and recognitions ==
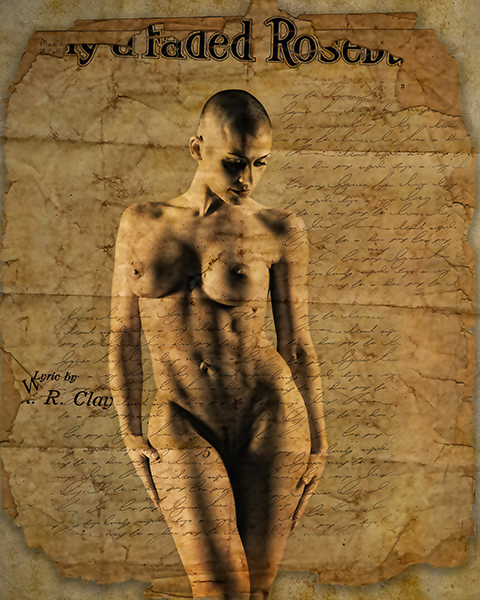
Faded Rose won the Portrait Photographers of Canada Best Figure Study award in 2009.

Laurie's awards include the PPOC 2009 Best Figure Study Faded Rose, The Societies of Photographers 2010 Landscape Society Photographer of the Year Award for "Lone Tree", In 2011 Laurie received an Artist of the Month recognition at Renderosity.com,
