= Woodman Junior High School =

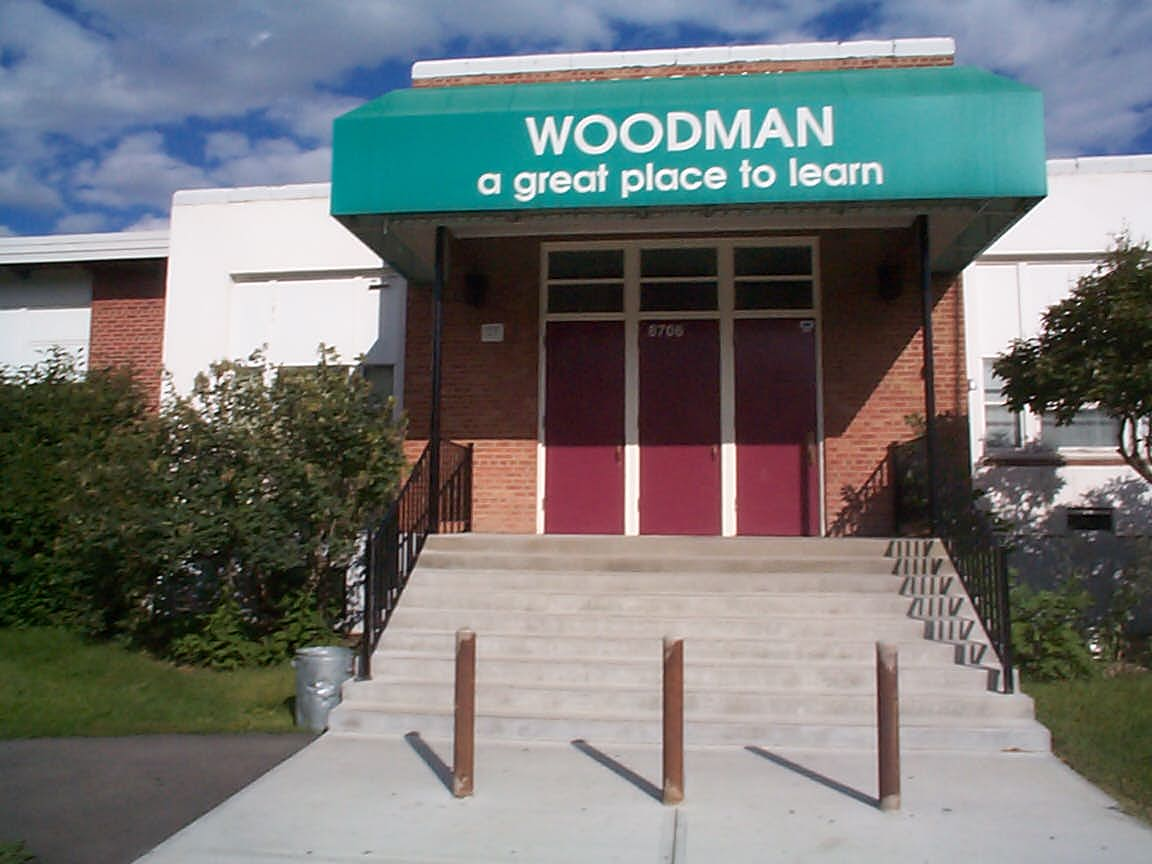

Location
- 8706 Elbow Drive S.W. Calgary, Alberta; Canada; 50.97615°N 114.08326°W

Information
- Motto: "A Great Place to Learn"
- Established: 1959
- School board: CBE
- Principal: Marlene Krickhan
- Enrollment: 475
  - Grade 5: 22
  - Grade 6: 29
  - Grade 7: 152
  - Grade 8: 128
  - Grade 9: 144
- Colors: Red and Black
- Mascot: Arctic Wolf
- Team name: Woodman Wolves
- Feeder to: Dr. E.P. Scarlett High School (designated AP HS) Henry Wise Wood High School (standard)
- Website: schools.cbe.ab.ca/b631

Woodman Junior High School is a major junior high school for S.W. Calgary, Alberta, Canada, accepting 5th, 6th, 7th, 8th, and 9th graders. The school was built in 1959, and the current principal is Marlene Krickhan.

== Name ==
The school was named after Mr. FL Woodman (1888-1967), a teacher with the Calgary Board of Education from 1915-1935 and the principal of Western Canada High School from 1935-1954. He was awarded the Calgary Sportsman of the Year, and the Calgary Booster Club described Mr. Woodman as a legend who made amateur sport a reality by his hard work and dedication.

== Programs ==
Program:	Grade(s):	Feeder Schools:
Regular Program (English)	7-9	Haysboro School Chinook Park School
Continuing French Program	5-9	Janet Johnstone (entry point: Grade 5) Chinook Park School (entry point: Grade 7)
Late French Program	7	All schools south of Glenmore Trail and west of Macleod Trail

== Athletics ==
Students can try out for a number of sports, including:

- Cross Country (no cut varsity team)
- Volleyball (junior development team, senior girls and boys)
- Wrestling (no cut varsity team)
- Basketball (girls and boys senior, junior development team)
- Badminton (junior 6/7, intermediate 8, senior 9; junior development team)
- Track and Field (junior varsity 6, junior 7, intermediate 8, senior 9)

== Music ==
Music is a required course for students in grades 5-6, and is an optional class for grades 7-9. Junior Band begins in grade 7, and Senior Band begins in grade 8.

== Lunchtime ==
There is supervised lunchtime for grades 5-6, who are given access to the school's upper field. The school is an open campus for grades 7-9, with several options for food available around Elbow Drive and Heritage Drive. There is no lunchtime options available in school (with the exception of the Healthy Hunger program, in which students can pre-order food from various establishments), though there are vending machines providing healthy snacks and drinks within the building.

== Transportation ==
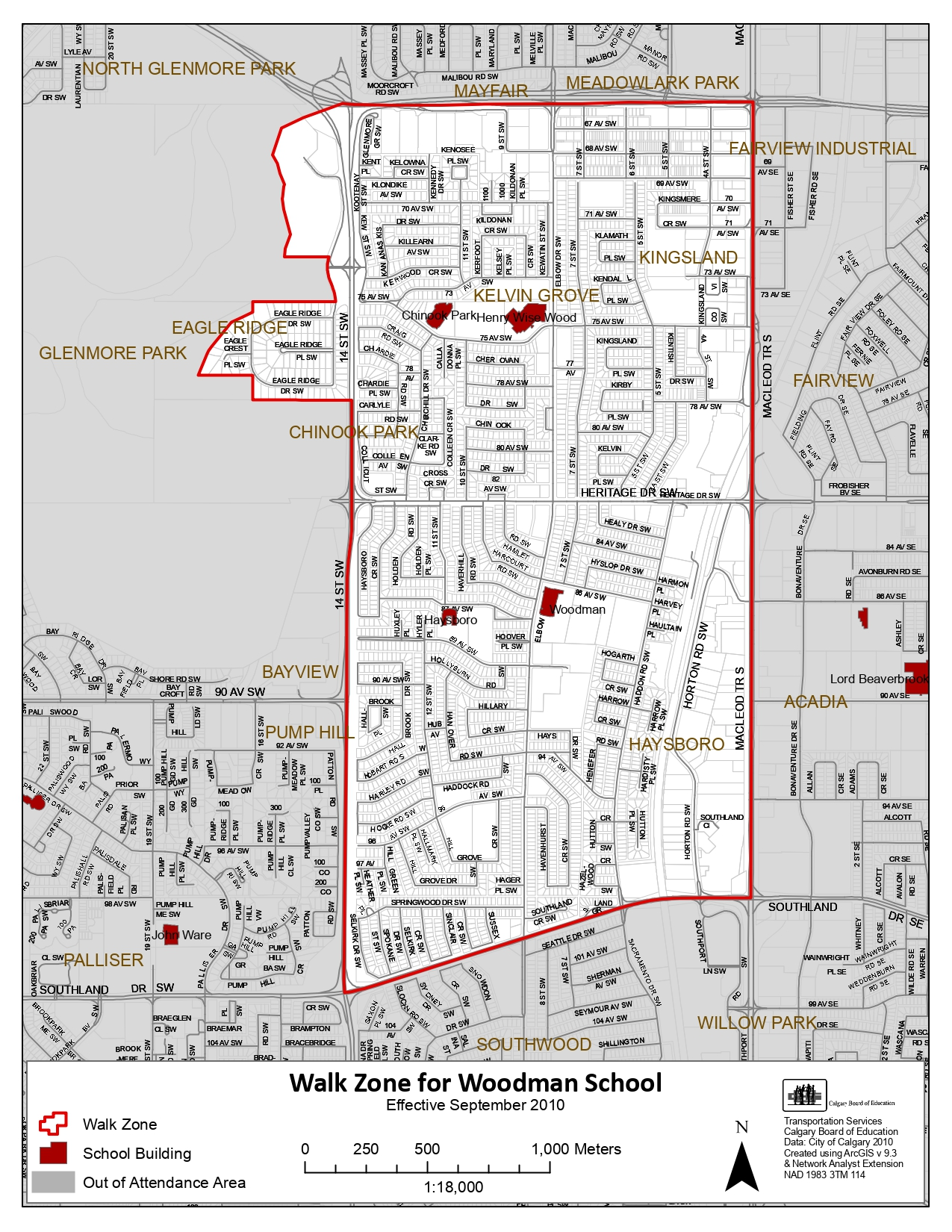
The school's walk zone

Though many students walk to school, the yellow school bus is available for students not living within the walk zone- this bus is administered by Southland Transportation. The school is also located near several Calgary Transit bus stops, and is an approximately 14 minute walk from Heritage station (Calgary), located on the CTrain's Red Line.
