= Linda Taylor (lawyer) =

Canadian lawyer and scholar

Linda Taylor (B.A., LL.B., LL.M.) is a Canadian lawyer and scholar specializing in human rights and international law who has primarily been active as a legal analyst and lawyer in various branches of the United Nations. She earned a B.A. and LL.B. at the University of Calgary and an LL.M at the University of Cambridge. In 2014, Calgary presented her with its Distinguished Alumni Award.

She is the executive director of the United Nations Office of Administration of Justice (OAJ), an internal administrative body.
