= Chinook Park, Calgary =

Chinook Park
- Neighbourhood
- Location of Chinook Park in Calgary
- Coordinates: 50°58′58″N 114°05′19″W
- Country: Canada
- Province: Alberta
- City: Calgary
- Quadrant: SW
- Ward: 11
- Established: 1959

Government
  - Mayor: Jeromy Farkas
  - Administrative body: Calgary City Council
  - Councillor: Rob Ward (Communities First)

Area
  - Total: 0.6 km^{2} (0.23 sq mi)
- Elevation: 1,070 m (3,510 ft)

Population (2006)
  - Total: 1,717
  - Average Income: $88,357
- Website: Chinook Park Community Association

Chinook Park is a residential neighbourhood in the southwest quadrant of Calgary, Alberta. It is bounded by Glenmore Trail to the north, Elbow Drive to the east, 14 Street W to the west and Heritage Drive to the south.

Chinook Park was established in 1959. It is represented in the Calgary City Council by the Ward 11 councillor.

== Demographics ==
In the City of Calgary's 2012 municipal census, Chinook Park had a population of 1,707 living in 589 dwellings, a 0.2% increase from its 2011 population of 1,703. With a land area of 0.6 km^{2} (0.23 sq mi), it had a population density of 2,850/km^{2} (7,400/sq mi) in 2012.

Residents in this community had a median household income of $88,357 in 2000, and there were 9.7% low income residents living in the neighbourhood. As of 2000, 19.8% of the residents were immigrants. A proportion of 18.3% of the buildings were condominiums or apartments, and 17.5% of the housing was used for renting.

== Education ==
The community is served by Chinook Park Bilingual Elementary and Henry Wise Wood High School public schools.

== See also ==
- List of neighbourhoods in Calgary
