= Kelvin Grove, Calgary =

Kelvin Grove
- Neighbourhood
- Location of Kelvin Grove in Calgary
- Coordinates: 50°59′26″N 114°05′18″W
- Country: Canada
- Province: Alberta
- City: Calgary
- Quadrant: SW
- Ward: 11
- Established: 1957

Government
  - Mayor: Jeromy Farkas
  - Administrative body: Calgary City Council
  - Councillor: Rob Ward (Communities First)

Area
  - Total: 0.7 km^{2} (0.27 sq mi)
- Elevation: 1,075 m (3,527 ft)

Population (2006)
  - Total: 2,266
  - Average Income: $52,468
- Website: Kelvin Grove Community Association

Kelvin Grove is a residential neighbourhood in the southwest quadrant of Calgary, Alberta. It is bounded to the north by Glenmore Trail, to the east by Elbow Drive, to the south by 75 Avenue S and to the west by 14 Street W. The Rockyview General Hospital is located immediately west of the community.

Kelvin Grove was established as a neighbourhood in 1957. It is represented in the Calgary City Council by the Ward 11 councillor.

== Demographics ==
In the City of Calgary's 2012 municipal census, Kelvin Grove had a population of 2,343 living in 903 dwellings, a 0.4% increase from its 2011 population of 2,334. With a land area of 0.8 km^{2} (0.31 sq mi), it had a population density of 2,930/km^{2} (7,600/sq mi) in 2012.

Residents in this community had a median household income of $84,960 in 2015.

== Education ==
The community is served by Chinook Park Bilingual Elementary and Henry Wise Wood Senior High public schools.

== See also ==
- List of neighbourhoods in Calgary
