= Eagle Ridge Golf Club =

Eagle Ridge Golf Club may refer to:

- Eagle Ridge Golf Club, Fort Myers, Florida
- Eagle Ridge Golf Club, Gilroy, California
- Eagle Ridge Golf Club, Lakewood, New Jersey
- Eagle Ridge Golf Club, Raleigh, North Carolina
- Eagle Ridge Golf Club, Summerfield, Florida
- Eagle Ridge Golf Club, Williston, North Dakota
