= Household net worth =

Net worth for individuals used to compare the wealth of different groups

Household total net is the net worth for individuals living together in a household and is used as a measure in economics to compare wealth. The household net worth is the value of total assets minus the total value of outstanding liabilities, which are current obligations of a household arising from past transactions or events.

== Disposable income ==
Household financial net worth is the balancing item of their financial balance sheet recorded at current market values. Total net worth is measured as a percentage of net disposable income.

== Purchasing power parity ==
The United States Census Bureau has collected uniform data on household income since the 1960s. The Bureau undertakes an annual Current Population Survey (CPS) and publishes detailed information on household income.

The financial net worth of a household is calculated as the ratio of financial net worth of households divided by the number of individuals in the country, expressed in United States dollars at current purchasing power parity.

== Household wellbeing ==
The household net worth can be assessed by considering factors that contribute to the household wellbeing, such as access to finance, debt default, and measures of economic security.

== Top 10 countries with largest household net worth ==
Household net worth Source: OECD
Country	% of net disposable income, 2017
Belgium	699.4
Netherlands	687.9
United States	683
Canada	585.1
Denmark	582.8
Sweden	578
France	553.7
United Kingdom	499.9
Germany	468.9
Austria	444.1
Australia	434.3
Luxembourg	423.7
South Korea	365.5
Czech Republic	349.3

== See also ==
- High-net-worth individuals
- List of countries by wealth per adult
- National wealth
- Ultra high-net-worth individuals
