= Hunt House =

Hunt House or Hunt Farm may refer to:

in Canada

- Hunt House, Calgary, in Alberta

in the United States

(by state)

- Hunt Bass Hatchery Caretaker's House, Phoenix, Arizona, listed on the NRHP in Phoenix, Arizona
- Thomas Hunt House, Plainview, Arkansas, listed on the NRHP in White County, Arkansas
- Hunt House (Searcy, Arkansas), listed on the NRHP in Yolo County, Arkansas
- Dresbach-Hunt-Boyer House, Davis, California, listed on the NRHP in Yolo County, California
- Hunt House (Griffin, Georgia), listed on the NRHP in Spalding County, Georgia
- Cabiness-Hunt House, Round Oak, Georgia, listed on the NRHP in Jones County, Georgia
- Daniel A. Hunt House, Dietrich, Idaho, listed on the NRHP in Lincoln County, Idaho
- E. F. Hunt House, Meridian, Idaho, listed on the NRHP in Ada County, Idaho
- Hunt House (St. Charles, Illinois), NRHP-listed
- Daniel Hunt Three-Decker, Worcester, Massachusetts, NRHP-listed
- David Hunt Three-Decker, Worcester, Massachusetts, NRHP-listed
- William B. Hunt House, Columbia, Missouri, NRHP-listed
- Wilson Price Hunt House, Normandy, Missouri, listed on the NRHP in St. Louis County, Missouri
- Parley Hunt House, Bunkerville, Nevada, listed on the NRHP in Nevada
- Hunt Farmstead, Rosedale, New Jersey, listed on the NRHP in Mercer County, New Jersey
- Hunt House (Hopewell Township, New Jersey), listed on the NRHP in Mercer County, New Jersey
- George Hunt House, Pohatcong Township, New Jersey, listed on the NRHP in Warren County, New Jersey
- Hunt House (Waterloo, New York), NRHP-listed
- Joseph P. Hunt Farm, Dexter, North Carolina, listed on the NRHP in Granville County, North Carolina
- Hunt-Wilke Farm, Cuyahoga Falls, Ohio, listed on the NRHP in Summit County, Ohio
- Hunt-Forman Farm, Franklin, Ohio, listed on the NRHP in Warren County, Ohio
- Henson Hunt House, Johnson City, Tennessee, listed on the NRHP in Carter County, Tennessee
- Hunt-Moore House, Huntland, Tennessee, listed on the NRHP in Franklin County, Tennessee
- Hunt-Phelan House, Memphis, Tennessee, listed on the NRHP in Shelby County, Tennessee
- Jones-Hunt House, Houston, Texas, listed on the NRHP in Harris County, Texas
- Hunt-Sitterding House, Richmond, Virginia, listed on the NRHP in Richmond, Virginia
- W. Ben Hunt Cabin, Hales Corners, Wisconsin, listed on the NRHP in Milwaukee County, Wisconsin
- Samuel Hunt House, Rutland, Wisconsin, listed on the NRHP in Dane County, Wisconsin
