= List of listed buildings in Kilninian And Kilmore, Argyll and Bute =

This is a list of listed buildings in the parish of Kilninian and Kilmore on the Isle of Mull in Argyll and Bute, Scotland.

== List ==
Name	Location	Date Listed	Grid Ref. (Note: Sometimes known as OSGB36, the grid reference (where provided) is based on the British national grid reference system used by the Ordnance Survey. • "Guide to National Grid". Ordnance Survey. • "Get-a-map". Ordnance Survey.)	Geo-coordinates	Notes	LB Number (Note: Historic Environment Scotland assign a unique alphanumeric identifier to each designated site in Scotland, for listed buildings this always begins with "LB", for example "LB12345".)	Image
Calgary Jetty				56°34′49″N 6°17′36″W	Category C(S)	11011	Upload Photo
Bellachroy Hotel, Dervaig				56°35′19″N 6°11′07″W	Category C(S)	11013	Upload another image See more images
Gometra House				56°29′05″N 6°17′49″W	Category B	11021	Upload another image See more images
Aros Castle				56°32′01″N 5°57′55″W	Category B	11017	Upload another image See more images
Ulva Ferry House				56°28′51″N 6°09′12″W	Category C(S)	11018	Upload another image
Croig Harbour And Sea Wall				56°36′18″N 6°14′06″W	Category B	12956	Upload another image
Aros Bridge, Aros River				56°31′53″N 5°58′31″W	Category B	11016	Upload another image
Frachadil House, Calgary				56°34′57″N 6°15′43″W	Category B	13730	Upload another image
Glen Gorm Castle, Sorn (Mishnish)				56°38′11″N 6°10′39″W	Category B	11014	Upload another image See more images
Old Ulva House				56°28′22″N 6°09′16″W	Category B	11020	Upload Photo
Kilninian Kirk				56°31′53″N 6°14′02″W	Category B	11009	Upload another image See more images
Calgary House				56°34′47″N 6°16′19″W	Category B	11010	Upload another image See more images
Torloisk House				56°31′57″N 6°12′46″W	Category B	43023	Upload another image See more images
Ulva Kirk				56°28′49″N 6°09′56″W	Category B	13729	Upload another image See more images
Tobermory Lighthouse, Rubha nan Gall				56°38′19″N 6°03′58″W	Category C(S)	11015	Upload another image See more images
Kilmore Kirk, Dervaig				56°35′15″N 6°11′11″W	Category B	11012	Upload another image See more images
Ulva Manse				56°28′47″N 6°09′53″W	Category B	11019	Upload Photo

== Key ==
The scheme for classifying buildings in Scotland is:

- Category A: "buildings of national or international importance, either architectural or historic; or fine, little-altered examples of some particular period, style or building type."
- Category B: "buildings of regional or more than local importance; or major examples of some particular period, style or building type, which may have been altered."
- Category C: "buildings of local importance; lesser examples of any period, style, or building type, as originally constructed or moderately altered; and simple traditional buildings which group well with other listed buildings."

In March 2016 there were 47,288 listed buildings in Scotland. Of these, 8% were Category A, and 50% were Category B, with the remaining 42% being Category C.

== See also ==
- List of listed buildings in Argyll and Bute
