= Kilninian and Kilmore =

Civil parish on Isle of Mull, Scotland

Coordinates: 56.62°N 6.07°W

Kilninian and Kilmore: Scottish Gaelic: Cill Naoi Nighean (Ninian) & A' Chille Mhór
- Civil parish
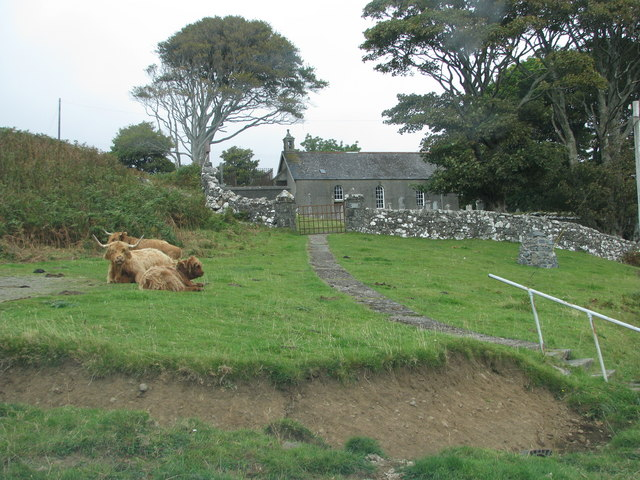
- Kilninian Kirk

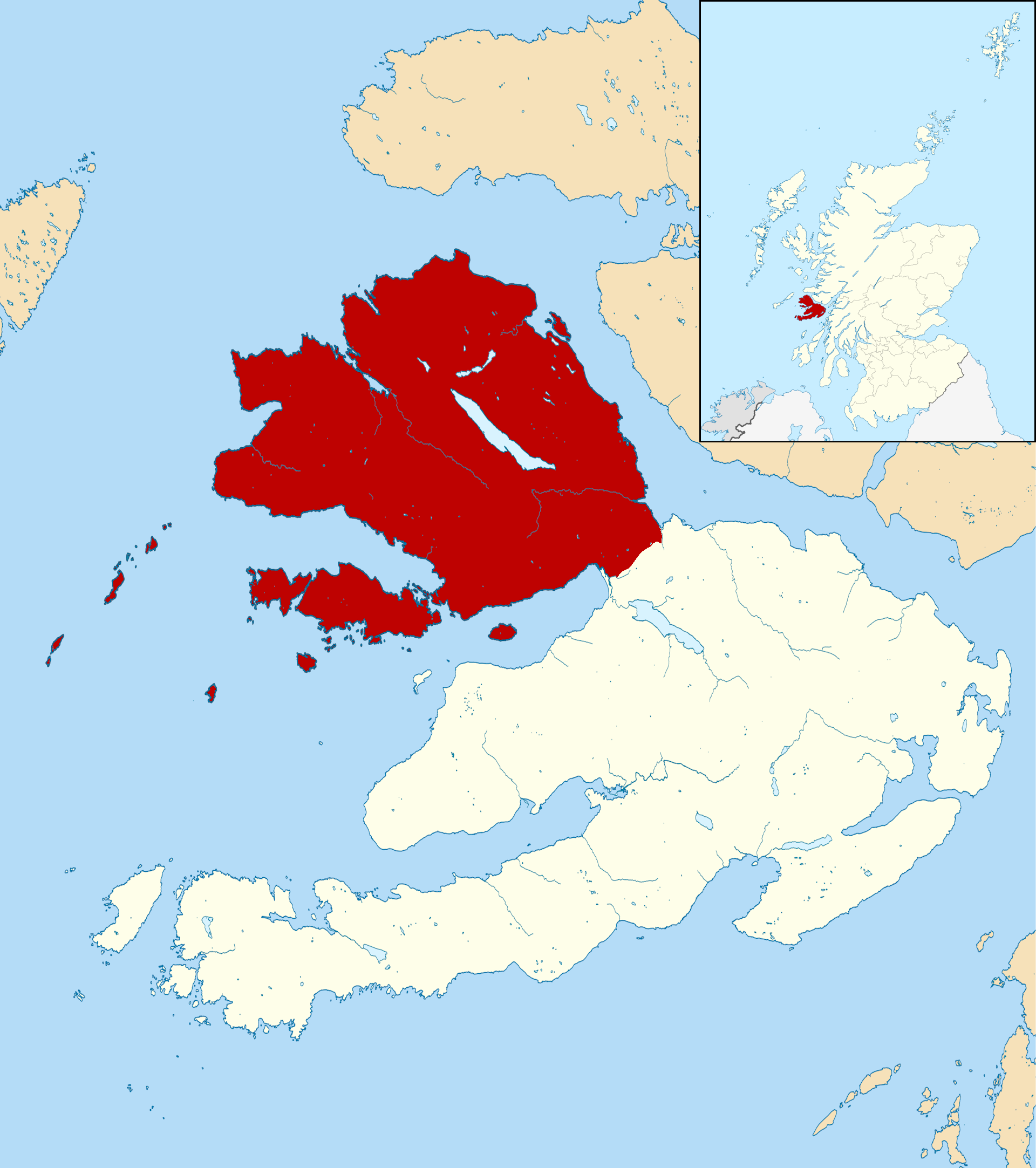
- Map of Kilninian and Kilmore within Mull
- Area: 116 sq mi (300 km^{2})
- Population: 1,606 (2011)
  - Density: 14/sq mi (5.4/km^{2})
- OS grid reference: NM504551
- Civil parish: Kilninian and Kilmore
- Council area: Argyll and Bute
- Lieutenancy area: Argyll and Bute
- Country: Scotland
- Sovereign state: United Kingdom
- Post town: ISLE OF MULL
- Postcode district: PA75
- Dialling code: 01688
- Police: Scotland
- Fire: Scottish
- Ambulance: Scottish
- UK Parliament: Argyll, Bute and South Lochaber
- Scottish Parliament: Argyll and Bute

Parishes of the Isle of Mull (1891) Kilninian and Kilmore shown in orange (and labelled 8)

Kilninian and Kilmore is a civil parish on the Isle of Mull in the county of Argyll, Scotland, part of the Argyll and Bute council area. It is one of three parishes on the island and extends over the north-western part. It is bordered by the parish of Torosay in the south-east. It extends about 15 miles (24 kilometres) north-west to south-east and is 13 miles (21 kilometres) wide.

== Etymology ==
The name Kilninian means, in Gaelic, either the church dedicated to St. Ninian or the church dedicated to the nine maidens. Kilmore simply means big church in Gaelic. The parish derives its name from the two places of worship. Although Mull had numerous parishes before the Reformation, afterwards these were amalgamated into one Parish of Mull, including Ulva, Iona and Inch Kenneth. Later, in 1688, the parish was divided at the narrow isthmus near Aros Castle, with north Mull becoming the new parish of Kilninian and Kilmore. The parish was named after the location of places of worship in use, rather than inheriting names directly from pre-reformation parishes.

== History ==
There were two churches in the parish, Kilninian, in the south on the shore of Loch Tuath, and Kilmore, in the north at Dervaig. Both were built in 1754, but the Kilmore church was replaced by a new building in 1905. In 1828, churches were built at Ulva and Tobermory and a separate quoad sacra (ecclesiastical) parish was created for each. At present, church services are held at Kilmore and Tobermory.

== Geography ==
The parish encompasses the northern-most of the three west facing peninsulas that make up Mull. The sea loch Loch na Keal is on its south and almost separates it from the rest of the island, however it is joined thereto by an isthmus next to Aros Castle. It is bounded on the north-east by the Sound of Mull, which separates Mull from the mainland of Scotland. In the centre is the five miles (8.0 km) long Loch Frisa, the largest freshwater loch in Mull. The small Ledmore river takes its overflow, feeding into the Aros River, which flows into the Sound. The catchment area of Locha Frisa is about eight square miles (21 km^{2}), only 7% of the parish. The main offshore islands are Ulva, Gometra, Little Colonsay, Staffa and Calve Island. Tobermory on the north-east coast, founded in 1788, is the capital of, and until 1973, the only burgh on the Isle of Mull.

== Demographics ==
At the 2011 census, the population of the civil parish was 1,606. 17.4% had some knowledge of Gaelic. In 1891 84.0% were Gaelic speaking. Of the islands, Ulva had a population of 11 and Gometra 2. The town of Tobermory had a population of 954 in 2011 and Dervaig about 100-150. The area of the parish is 74,267 acres (116.0 mi^{2}; 300.5 km^{2}).

== Administration ==
The parish council was formed in 1895 with 9 members, 4 nominated by the burgh council of Tobermory and 5 directly elected for that part of the parish outside the burgh (the “landward” part). The councillors from the landward part of the parish (augmented by one, elected for that purpose) formed a Landward Committee to administer powers that were, within the burgh, the responsibility of Tobermory burgh council. The parish council was replaced by Mull District Council in 1930, which had 6 members, 3 of whom were the County Councillors for Mull and 3 elected to the District Council from wards based on the three parishes, however Tobermory continued to have its own burgh council (until 1973). Since 1976 there has been an Isle of Mull community council.

== Landmarks ==
- Aros Castle
- Calgary Castle
- Dùn Ara
- Fingal's Cave
- Glengorm Castle
- Torloisk House
- Rubha nan Gall Lighthouse

== Settlements ==
- Tobermory
- Dervaig
- Calgary
- Achleck
- Ulva Ferry

== See also ==
- Torosay
- Kilfinichen and Kilvickeon
