= Frisa =

Frisa may refer to:

== People ==
- Dan Frisa (born 1955), American lawyer and congressman

== Places ==
- Frisa, Abruzzo, a town in the Province of Chieti, Italy
- Loch Frisa, Isle of Mull, Inner Hebrides, Scotland

== See also ==
- Loch Frisa, former name of the frigate HMS Widemouth Bay (K615)
