= Brisebois =

Brisebois is a surname. Notable people with the surname include:

- Danielle Brisebois (born 1969), American music producer and songwriter
- Éphrem-A. Brisebois (1850–1890), Canadian politician, soldier, and policeman
- Guillaume Brisebois (born 1997), Canadian ice hockey player
- Julien BriseBois (born 1977), Canadian ice hockey executive
- Patrice Brisebois (born 1971), French Canadian professional ice hockey player
