= Calgary, Mull =

Hamlet on the Isle of Mull, Scotland

Coordinates: 56.583°N 6.272°W

Calgary: Scottish Gaelic: Calgairidh
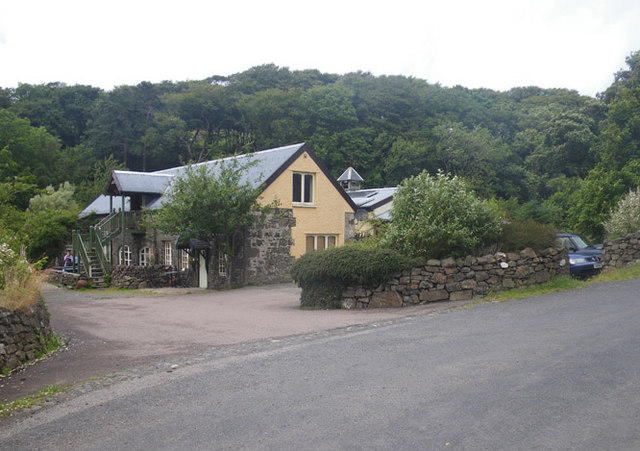
- Tearoom near the road in Calgary

- Location within Argyll and Bute
- OS grid reference: NM377516
- Civil parish: Kilninian and Kilmore
- Council area: Argyll and Bute
- Lieutenancy area: Argyll and Bute
- Country: Scotland
- Sovereign state: United Kingdom
- Post town: ISLE OF MULL
- Postcode district: PA75
- Dialling code: 01688
- Police: Scotland
- Fire: Scottish
- Ambulance: Scottish
- UK Parliament: Argyll, Bute and South Lochaber
- Scottish Parliament: Argyll and Bute

Calgary is a hamlet on the northwest coast of the Isle of Mull, in Argyll and Bute, Scotland, United Kingdom. The hamlet is within the parish of Kilninian and Kilmore. It was the origin of the name of Fort Calgary in Canada, which became the city of Calgary, Alberta.

== Geography ==
Calgary is situated on the B8073, about 5 miles (8 kilometres) west of Dervaig, and 12 mi (19 km) from the island's capital Tobermory. The settlement is a small community of houses scattered near a hotel and the Calgary Farmhouse.

The hamlet is at the eastern end of Calgary Bay and is framed by low hills, partly wooded. A broad area of machair (a grassy meadow growing on calcareous sand) lies between the land and the beach. As the tide falls a river meanders across the sands. The beach is served by a small car parking area and public toilets. It is not an official campsite but there is a designated area for short-stay wild camping in tents. Calgary Castle overlooks the bay.

== History ==
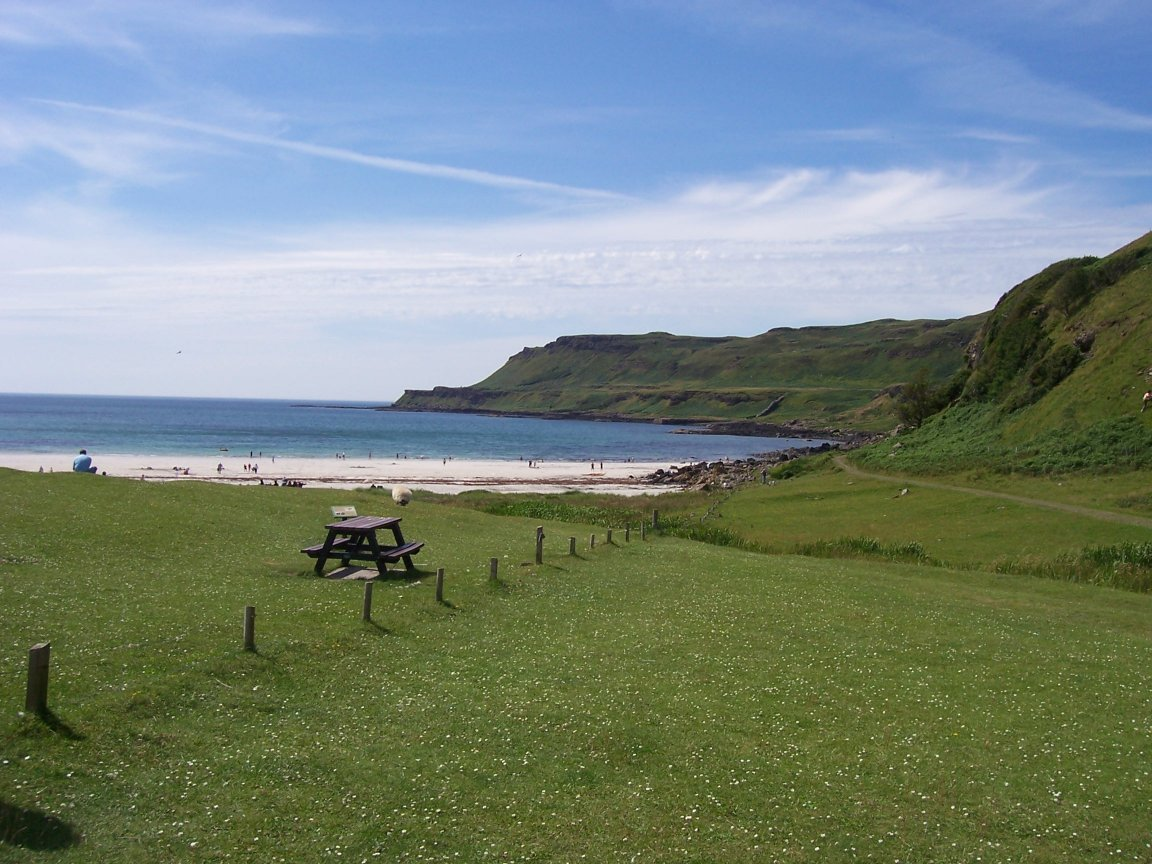
Calgary Bay

The name comes from the Gaelic, Cala ghearraidh, meaning Beach of the meadow (pasture). "Cala" is the word specifically used for a hard, sandy beach suitable for landing a boat, which relates plausibly to the location. However, the museum on the Isle of Mull explains that kald and gart are similar Old Norse words, meaning "cold" and "garden", that were likely used when named by the Vikings who inhabited the Inner Hebrides. A small stone pier, originally built to allow "Clyde puffers" (small steam-driven cargo boats) to deliver coal to the Mornish Estate, was also used to take sheep to and from grazing on the Treshnish Isles and gives a further possible reason for the name of the bay.

Just up the hill from the pier the deserted village of Inivea remains as roofless stone ruins, an atmospheric relic of the Highland clearances. David Tennant (the Tenth Doctor on Doctor Who) traced his family back to here in the BBC programme, Who Do You Think You Are? Around 24 buildings of the township can be seen, several of them still standing to wall head level. These included houses and barns, with enclosures probably forming kailyards. A flattish area to the north, higher than the houses, shows signs of rig and furrow cultivation and a drying kiln. A rocky knoll above the houses still has the remains of a dun, though many of its stones were taken to build the houses.

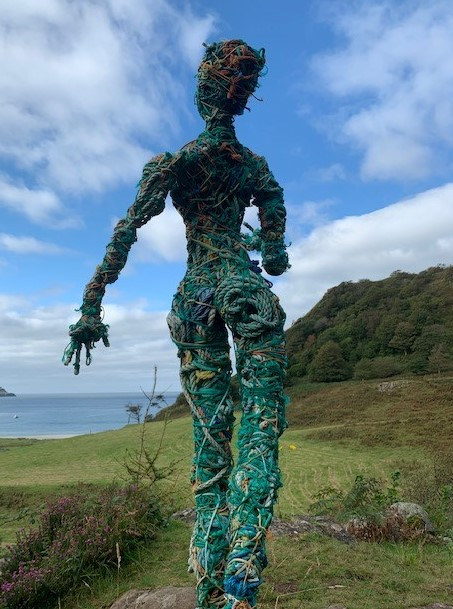
Rope sculpture at Calgary Bay

On the East side of the bay Calgary House, now called Calgary Castle, was built in 1817 extending an earlier Calgary Estate laird's house. Colonel James Macleod, Commissioner of the North-West Mounted Police, was a summer guest here. In 1876, shortly after returning to Canada, he suggested its name for Fort Calgary which gave rise to the city of Calgary, Alberta, a metropolis of 1,700,000.

== Literature ==
The second verse of Sorley Maclean's poem Tràighean (from Dàin do Eimhir) opens with a powerful invocation of the natural beauty of Calgary bay as symbolic of spending eternity with a loved one:

Agus nan robh sinn cuideachd
air tràigh Chalgaraidh am Muile,
eadar Alba is Tiriodh,
eadar an saoghal 's a'bhiothbhuan,
dh'fhuirichinn an siud gu luan
a' tomhas gainmhich bruan air bhruan.

Translation:

And if we were together
on Calgary shore in Mull,
between Scotland and Tiree,
between the world and eternity,
I would stay there till doom,
measuring sand, grain by grain.
