= The Confluence Historic Site & Parkland =

Fort, historical site and museum in Calgary, Alberta, Canada

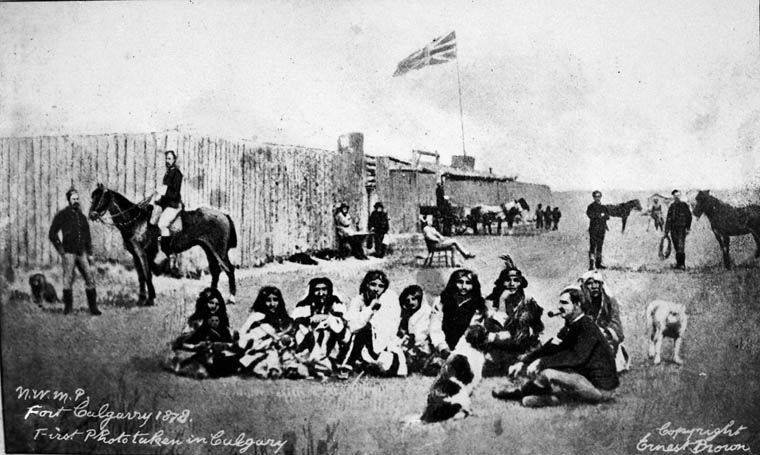
- North-West Mounted Police with Kainai Nation members at Fort Calgary, 1878
- Interactive map of The Confluence Historic Site & Parkland
- 51°02′43″N 114°02′44″W
- Etymology: Calgary House, a castle at Calgary Bay on the Isle of Mull, Scotland
- Location: 750 9th Avenue SE; Calgary, Alberta, Canada

History
- Built: 1875
- Built for: North-West Mounted Police
- Original use: Police outpost
- Demolished: 1914

Site notes
- Area: 12 hectares (30 acres)
- Current use: Historic park and social centre
- Governing body: The Confluence Historic Site and Parkland (Note: The following is the governing body's trade name. The body is formally known as the Fort Calgary Preservation Society.)
- Owner: City of Calgary
- Visitors: 25,193 (in 2019)
- Website: www.theconfluence.ca

National Historic Site of Canada
- Official name: Fort Calgary National Historic Site
- Designated: 15 May 1925

Fort Calgary was a North-West Mounted Police outpost at the confluence of the Bow and Elbow rivers in present-day Calgary, Alberta, Canada. Originally named Fort Brisebois, after the outpost's first commander, the outpost was renamed Fort Calgary in June 1876.

The outpost was built in 1875 as a part of the North-West Mounted Police (NWMP) larger effort to curtail American rum and whisky runners in the region, and to establish relationships with the Indigenous peoples of the territory. The palisades were removed in 1882 and the former fort was designated as a "district post". The NWMP used the expanded barracks there until 1914 when the site was sold to Grand Trunk Pacific Railway. The police buildings were demolished to make way for a rail terminal, although the site's significance was later recognized when it was named a National Historic Site in 1925.

In 1975, the municipal government of Calgary purchased a plot of land that included the National Historic Site and reopened it as Fort Calgary Historic Park in 1978. The historic park initially documented the NWMP role in the area, although its scope was expanded to focus on the Calgary's history in 1995. Reconstruction of several former buildings within Fort Calgary took place in the 1990s. In 2024, the Fort Calgary Historic Park was rebranded as The Confluence Historic Site and Parkland to better reflect the historical significance of the area.

== Background ==
The confluence of the Bow and Elbow River, where the fort was built, is on the traditional territory of the Niitsitapi (Blackfoot Confederacy; Siksika, Kainai, Piikani), the îyârhe Nakoda (Chiniki, Bearspaw, Wesley), the Tsuut'ina people and Métis Nation, Region 3, and has been a significant age-old gathering place.

By the early 1870s, American whisky and rum runners were conducting trade with First Nations in the area. The illegal trade and American incursion prompted the government of Canada to create the North-West Mounted Police (NWMP) in 1873 to reassert Canadian sovereignty and curtail the whisky trade in the region. By 1874, the NWMP had captured or chased away most of the illegal traders, and had begun work on several forts in the area; believing that the lawlessness seen in the settlement of the American west was preventable if law enforcement was in place before settlers arrived into the area. After Fort Macleod was established, the whisky traders moved their operations further away from it. A decision was made to build an NWMP outpost at the midway point between Fort Macleod and Fort Edmonton in June 1875. "F" Troop, commanded by Éphrem-A. Brisebois, was tasked with establishing the outpost at the midway point.

== History ==
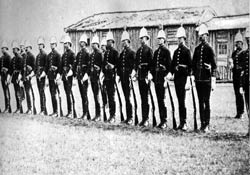
Members of the NWMP at Fort Calgary, 1875

The I. G. Baker Company arrived at the site in July 1875, having been hired to construct the NWMP outpost. The fort was initially planned to be located near present-day Holy Cross Centre, with an advanced detachment of "F" Troop marking a spot near the site. However, Brisebois elected to build the fort near the junction of the Bow and Elbow Rivers instead. Materials including spruce and pine were logged upstream and floated down to the site. The fort was originally bounded by a wooden palisade with several structures inside it; including a stables, barracks, guard room, and storage facilities. The fort was completed by December 1875, and cost the Canadian government C$2,476 to build. The outpost was initially known as the Bow River Fort until it was officially named Fort Brisebois in December 1875, after the commander of "F" Troop. However, Brisebois' superiors at NWMP headquarters had felt Brisebois misused his authority in naming the outpost and decided to rename the outpost Fort Calgary in June 1876. The name was recommended by James Macleod of the NWMP, who took the name from Calgary House in Scotland.

The outpost had inadequate heating and insulation after it was completed, resulting in poor living conditions for its garrison. Combined with Brisebois' poor leadership, the members of "F" Troop mutinied during the winter of 1875–76 and sent a delegation to the headquarters in Fort Macleod to list out complaints against the commander. Brisebois was not relieved immediately after that incident, although was eventually replaced by Lawrence Herchmer in August 1876.

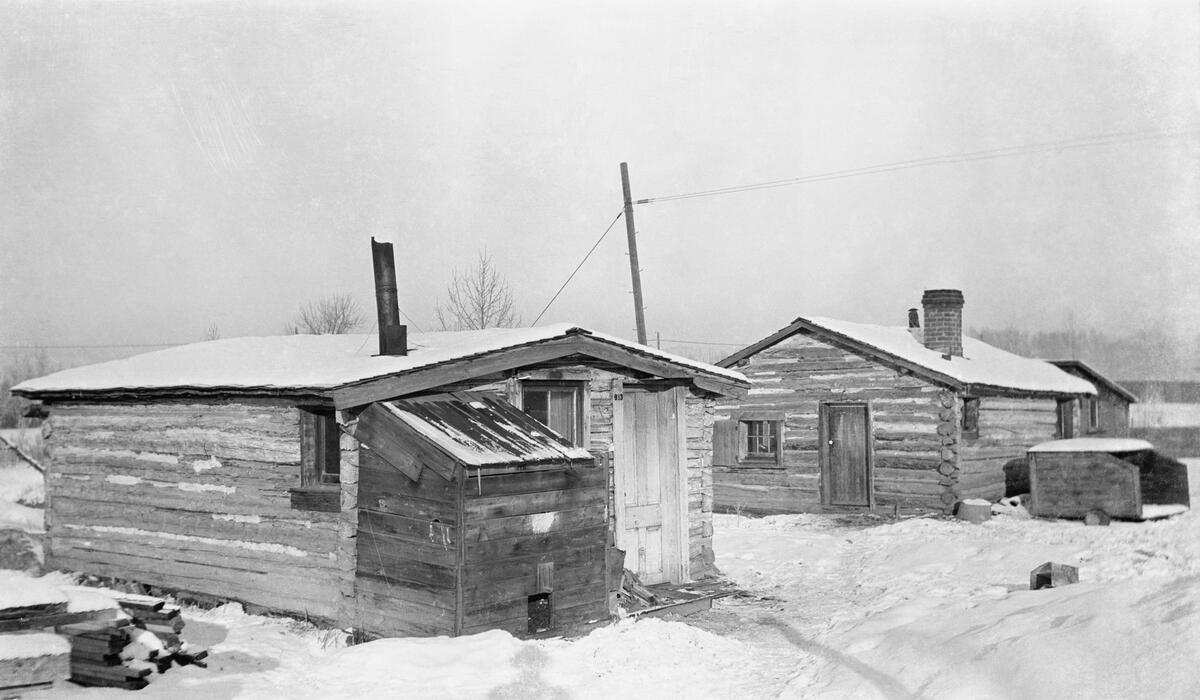
Hunt Houses near the fort, 1910. The houses was built by Métis employees of the Hudson's Bay Company after they moved their operations near the fort.

The I. G. Baker Company incorporated the area around the fort as a part of its larger transportation network on the Whoop-Up Trail; and built a trading post and storehouse a few hundred metres away from the fort. The commercial opportunities provided by the transportation network also attracted the Hudson's Bay Company, who relocated their trading post at the Ghost River to the Elbow River across from Fort Calgary. Initially, the outpost also housed a mission of the Missionary Oblates of Mary Immaculate, although the mission later relocated upriver in 1875. By 1877, a permanent church was established at the I. G. Baker Company post. During the latter half of the 1870s, the area found itself as a stopover route for travellers going from Fort Benton, Montana to Fort Edmonton.

The decline in the illegal whisky and buffalo trade lessened the need for a fortified outpost in the area, resulting in the fort's detachment to decline to four constables by 1880. However, the situation reversed in the early 1880s, with several plans drafted to develop the area surrounding Fort Calgary. In August 1882, the outpost was designated as a "district post," and its detachment was reinforced to provide a permanent police presence as well as enforce legal ordinances for the Canadian Pacific Railway reserve adjacent to the fort. James Walker, a former NWMP member and owner of the Bow River Saw and Planing Mill was contracted to expand the outpost. The contract called for the construction of a barracks, a guardroom with 12 holding cells, a hospital, officers' quarters, a sergeants' mess, and facilities for tradesmen. To accommodate the outpost's expansion, the fort's palisades were taken down, and several of the outpost's older buildings were razed. The expansion cost the government approximately C$35,000.

From 1882 to 1902, a number of changes were made to the site, and some structures were torn down and replaced with buildings better able to address contemporary needs. Police operations at the fort ended in 1914, after Grand Trunk Pacific Railway bought the site for C$250,000. All the remaining buildings were demolished by Grand Truck Pacific Railway to make way for a rail terminal.

=== Post-demolition history ===
On 15 May 1925, the site where Fort Calgary stood was designated as a National Historic Site of Canada.

In 1975, the municipal government purchased the site, intending to develop it into a historic site. The city launched an archaeological study of the site to determine the exact location of the demolished fort. That year, archaeologists unearthed parts of the original wooden fort and its artifacts, although they were forced to quickly re-cover them due to their rapid and uncontrolled disintegration while exposed to open air. An interpretive centre was built on the site in 1977.

==== Historic park ====
The site was officially reopened as a historical museum, Fort Calgary Historic Park, in 1978. Initially, the museum's exhibits were focused on the NWMP and their relationship with the First Nations, and the force's perception in popular culture.

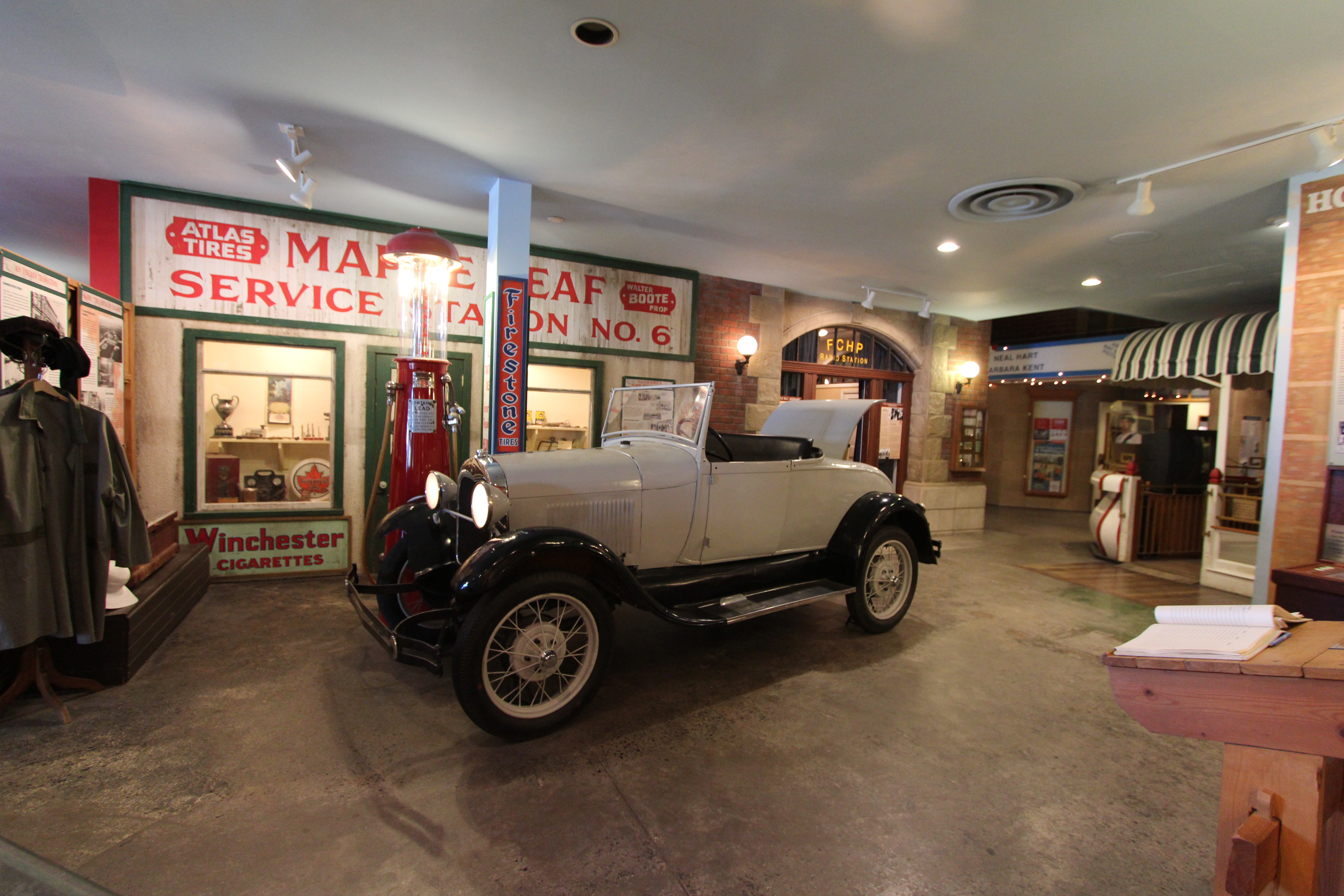
Exhibits at the site's interpretive centre, 2014

The museum's operations were reoriented in 1995, changing the museum's focus to one oriented towards the history of Calgary. Reconstructions of Fort Calgary's stables and wagon shed were also erected during this period. In 2000, a replica of the NWMP's two-storey barracks was completed on the site. After the final report from the Truth and Reconciliation Commission of Canada was released in 2015, the museum's administration shifted its focus to better include indigenous perspectives of the site.

From 2014 to 2020, a three-phase expansion and restoration project of the historic site occurred, costing approximately C$36 million. The first stage includes restorations to Deane House and Hunt House, while the second phase saw the development of the "F" Troop memorial exhibit. The museum's interpretive centre was renovated and expanded as a part of the final phase of the project. The expansion and renovations of the interpretive centre cost approximately C$10.4 million.

On 2 May 2024 the Fort Calgary Historic Park was rebranded as The Confluence Historic Site and Parkland to better reflect the site's history prior to the fort and to better reflect the location which the site is on.

== Grounds ==
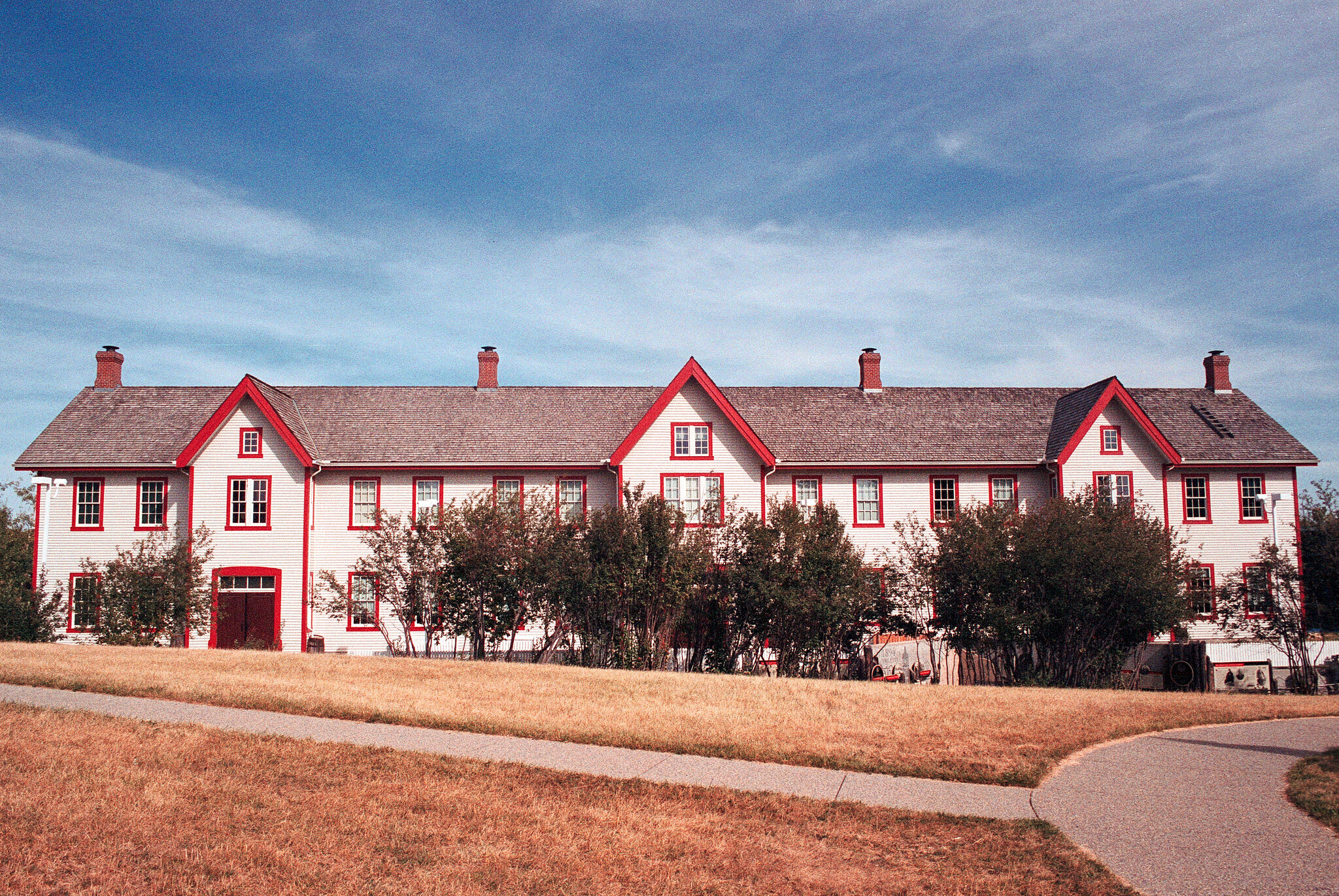
Exterior of the reconstructed NWMP barracks in 2020

The Confluence Historic Site and Parkland is a 16 hectares (40 acres) historic site that sits on a grassy flood plain along the south shore of the Bow River, near the river junction with the Elbow river. However, the Fort Calgary National Historic Site of Canada designation is confined to a parcel of land surrounding the area where the fort originally stood, approximately 12 hectares (30 acres) in size.

The site contains several reconstructions of structures that were built within the fort, including the stables, wagon shed, and barracks modelled after the one built in 1888. The reconstructed buildings were completed during the 1990s and 2000. An interpretive centre was also erected on the site in 1977; with the size of the centre expanded to 5,000 square metres (54,000 sq ft) during the 2010s. Exhibits and audio-visual and interactive presentations of Calgary's history and the NWMP are situated in the 1888 barracks and the interpretive centre.

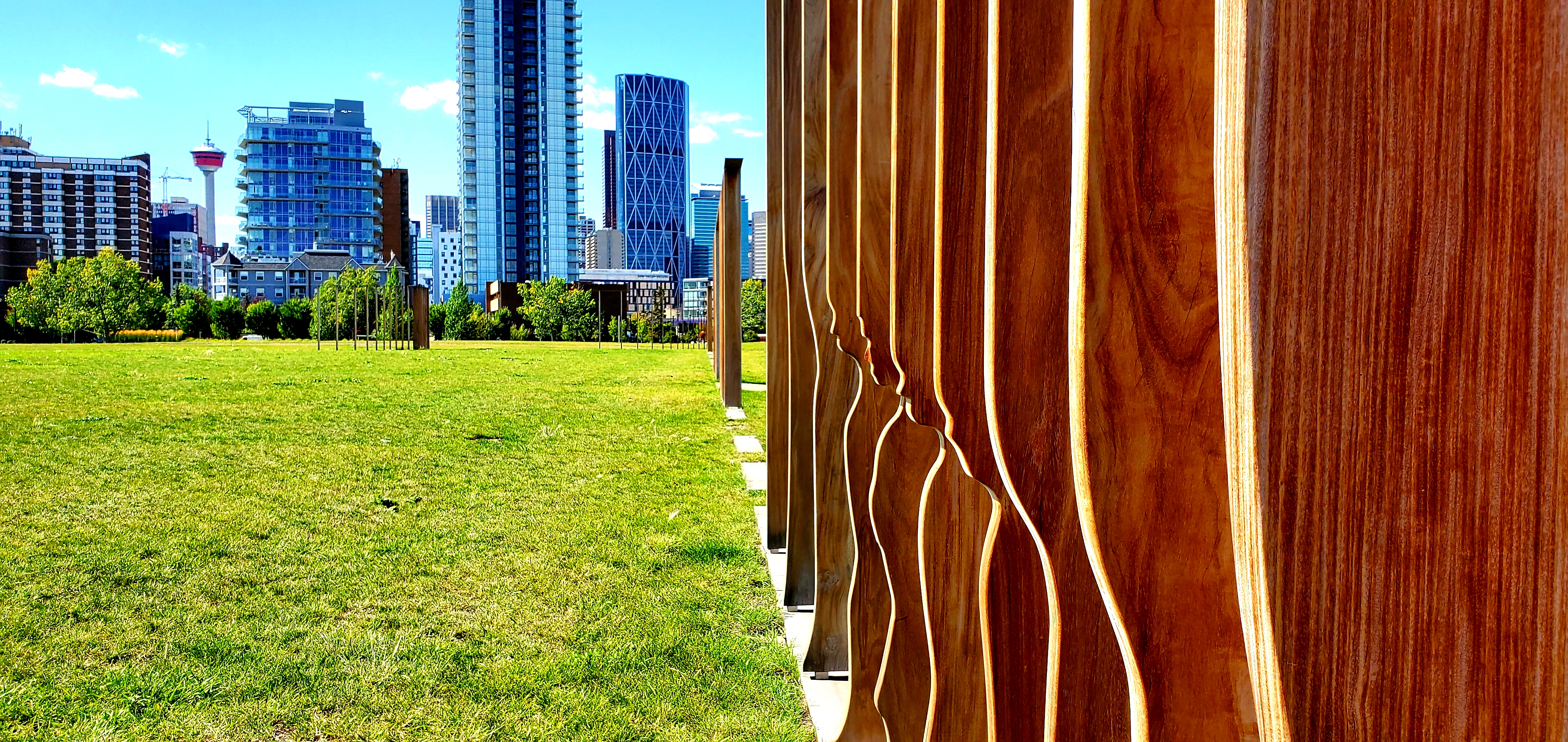
An art installation of wood slats used to outline the original fort and the height of its palisades.

In 2016, an art installation was unveiled at the site, with vertical wood slats topped with metal and placed on the outline of the original fort. The wood slats used for the installation is approximately the same height as the palisades used for Fort Calgary. From a certain angle, the wood slats are shaped to resemble 12 standing figures. The installation is illuminated with red lights during the night. The art installation is titled Marking and was created by Jill Anholt.

=== Related landmarks ===
Also located at The Confluence are two landmarks whose history is intertwined with Fort Calgary, the Deane House and Hunt House.

==== Deane House ====
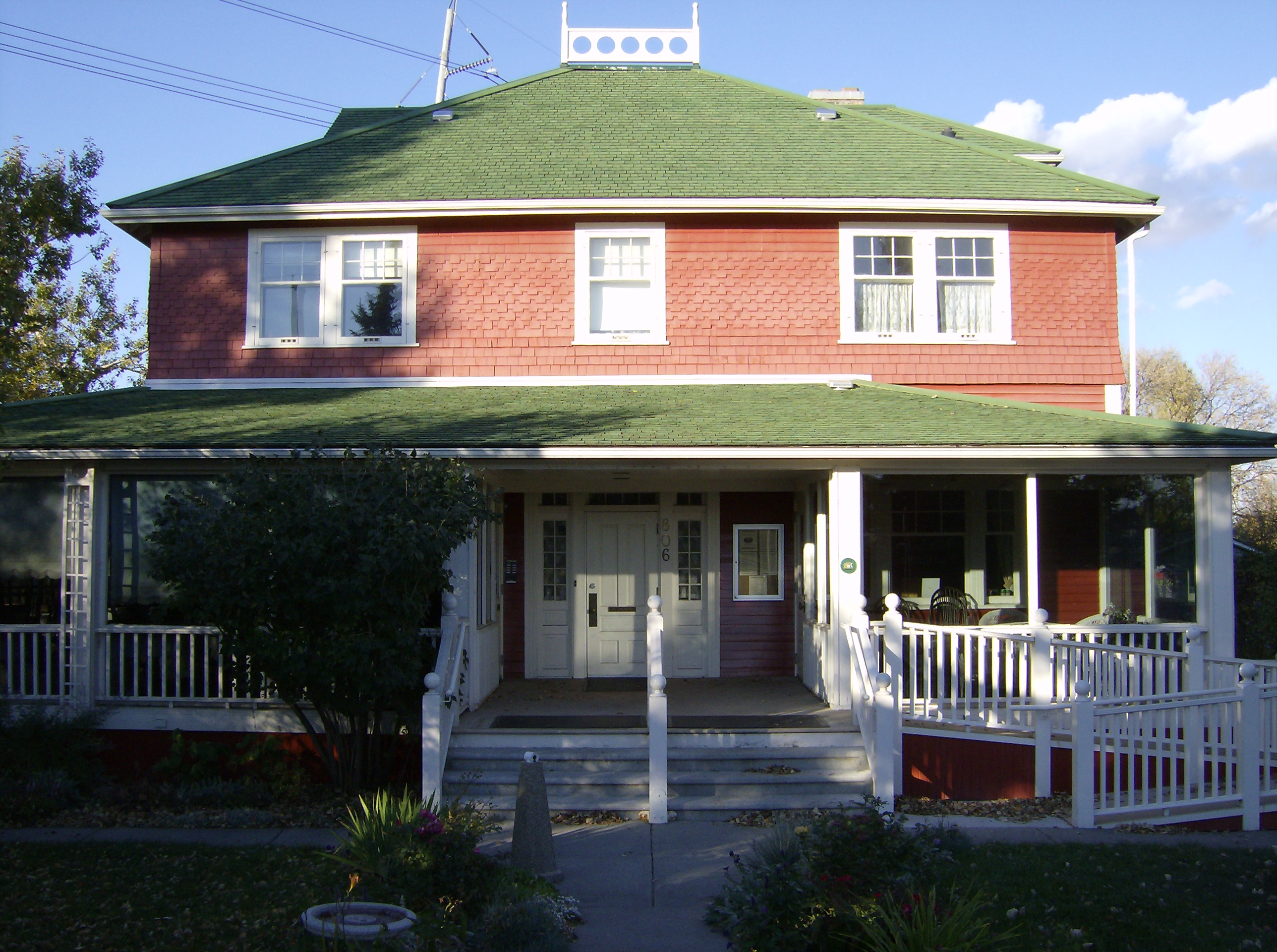
The Deane House in 2006. It was built in 1906 near Fort Calgary for its superintendent. The building was moved to its present site across the Elbow River in 1929.

The Deane House was built near Fort Calgary in 1906 for the superintendent of Fort Calgary, Captain Richard Burton Deane. He wrote about the house in his 1916 memoir Mounted Police Life in Canada. The house was originally constructed near 9th Ave and 6th St SE, facing east towards the barracks. Deane felt the previous superintendent's house was not good enough for his wife Martha. Although the budget for the project was $5,000, the total cost was $6,200. In 1914, the Grand Trunk Railway bought the house and relocated to the southeast corner of the lot; serving as an office and station master's house. The house was then purchased by C. L. Jacques in 1929 and moved across the Elbow River, where it stands today. It was used as a boarding house for several decades and was named Jasper Lodge. It was later purchased by Alex Brotherton who renamed the building Gaspé Lodge. Alex Brotherton died in the home in 1968 and the property was sold and proceeds divided among his children (Alfena Cunningham and Patrica Brotherton (Patricia Perkins), whose descendants still live in Calgary.

In 1973, the city bought the building and turned it into a cooperative studio space for artists and writers and an exhibition space called the Dandelion Gallery. In the summer of 1975, Joan Clark, Edna Alford and Velma Foster published the first edition of Dandelion Magazine, a publication that would become known as Alberta's leading literary magazine. In 1978, the City closed the Dandelion Artists' Cooperative with plans to turn the house into a teahouse and restaurant. Today, the house continues to be owned by the city. It currently features a restaurant called Deane House and has undergone significant renovations as part of the MakeHistory upgrades to Fort Calgary.

==== Hunt House ====
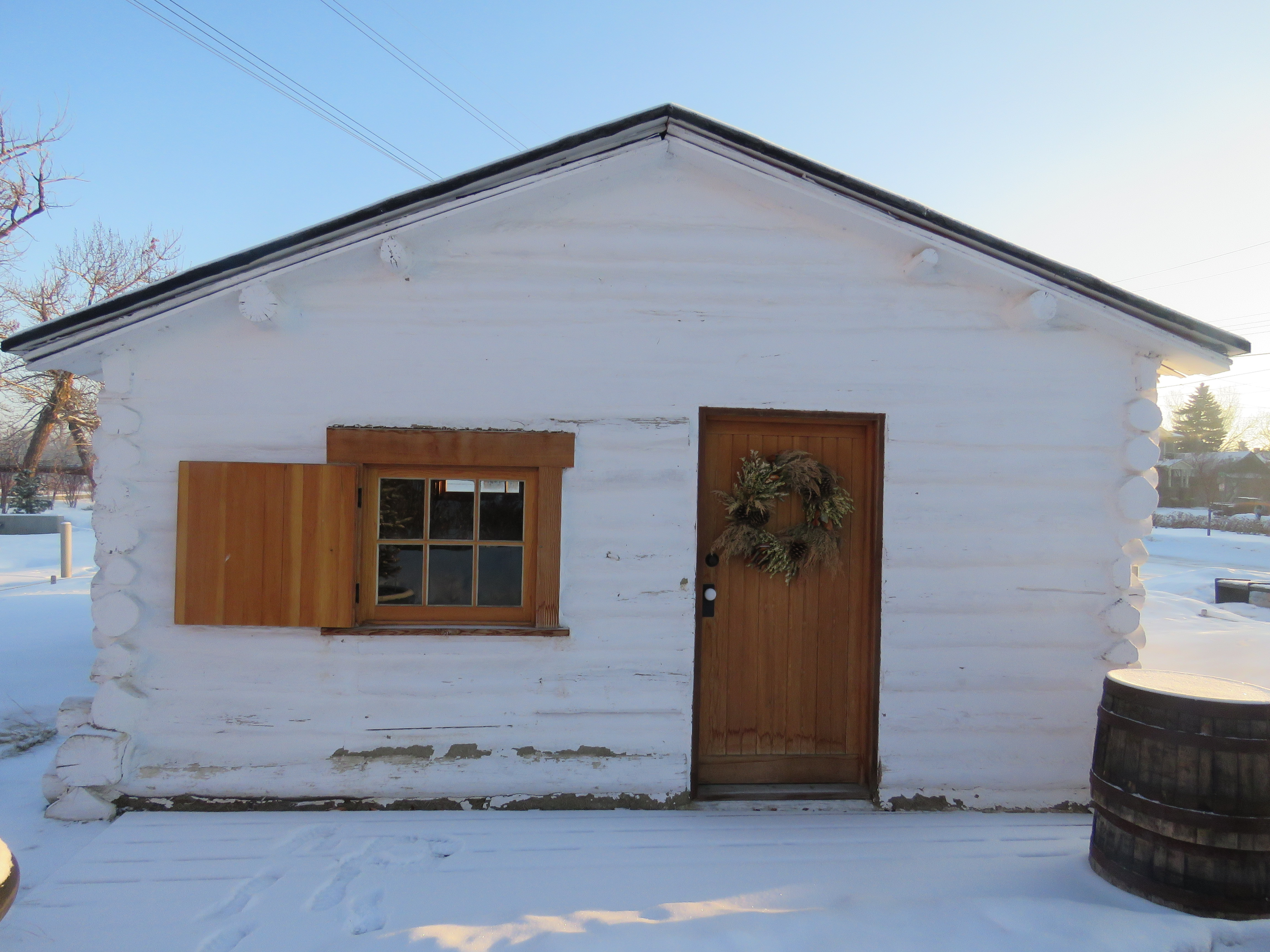
Hunt House in 2018. It is the oldest building located in Calgary.

The Hunt House is the oldest building in Calgary still located on its original site, 890 Ninth Avenue S.E. It was built between 1876 and 1881 for Métis employees of the Hudson's Bay Company store located at 8th Street and 9th Avenue SE. The style of the original log building expresses a rare form of construction: unlike many H.B.C. buildings, the Hunt House did not employ post-on-sill construction, but rather the dovetail corner method typical of southern Alberta and expressive of American cultural influences.

The last person to live in the house was William Hunt, a rail worker, who died in the mid-1970s. It became an Alberta Provincial Historic Resource in 1977.

== Affiliations ==
The museum is affiliated with the Canadian Museums Association, Canadian Heritage Information Network, and the Virtual Museum of Canada.

== See also ==
- List of forts
- List of museums in Alberta
