= Durham-Sud =

- Municipality
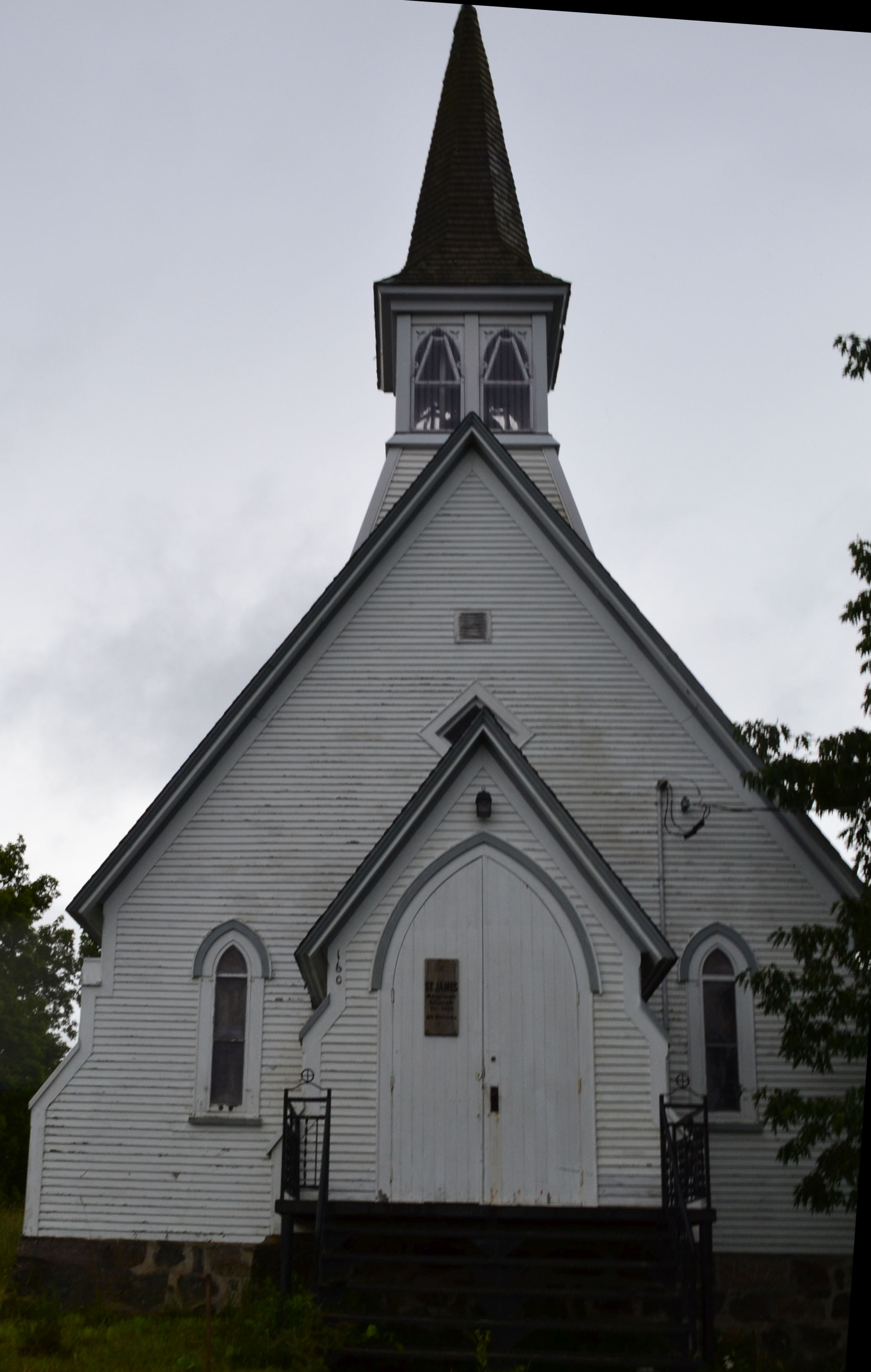

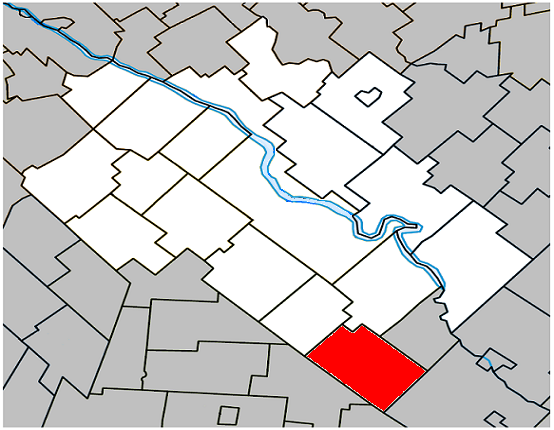
- Location within Drummond RCM

- Location in southern Quebec
- Coordinates: 45°40′N 72°20′W
- Country: Canada
- Province: Quebec
- Region: Centre-du-Québec
- RCM: Drummond
- Constituted: November 1, 1975

Government
  - Mayor: Sylvie Laval
  - Federal riding: Drummond
  - Prov. riding: Marie-Lacoste-Gérin-Lajoie

Area
  - Total: 92.70 km^{2} (35.79 sq mi)
  - Land: 93.43 km^{2} (36.07 sq mi)
- There is an apparent contradiction between two authoritative sources.

Population (2011)
  - Total: 1,008
  - Density: 10.8/km^{2} (28/sq mi)
  - Pop 2006-2011: ▼1.0%
  - Dwellings: 420
- Time zone: UTC−5 (EST)
  - Summer (DST): UTC−4 (EDT)
- Postal code(s): J0H 2C0
- Area code: 819
- Highways: R-116
- Website: www.durham-sud.com

Durham-Sud (French pronunciation: [dyʁam syd]), also known as South Durham, is a small farming community in the Eastern Townships of Quebec, west of Richmond and south of Drummondville. The population as of the Canada 2011 Census was 1,008.

== History ==
Early settlers of the area were Scottish and Irish immigrants who arrived mostly in the 18th and 19th century and found the area to be good for farming. Today, the community is predominantly francophone.

Éphrem-A. Brisebois was born here in 1850.

== Demographics ==
=== Population ===
Population trend:

Census	Population	Change (%)
2011	1,008	▼1.0%
2006	1,018	▲2.3%
2001	995	▲0.7%
1996	988	▼6.0%
1991	1,051	N/A

=== Language ===
Mother tongue (2011)

Language	Population	Pct (%)
French only	880	87.1%
English only	100	9.9%
English and French	10	1.0%
Non-official languages	20	2.0%

== Notable people ==
- Éphrem-A. Brisebois (1850–1890), politician, soldier, and law enforcement officer
- Jean-Paul LeBlanc (born 1946), retired ice hockey forward
- Joseph Patrick (August 4, 1857 – January 28, 1941) a Canadian businessman who helped start the Pacific Coast Hockey Association
- Walter George Mitchell (May 30, 1877 – April 3, 1935), Canadian lawyer and politician.

== See also ==
- List of anglophone communities in Quebec
- List of municipalities in Quebec
