= Rosedale, Mercer County, New Jersey =

Populated place in Mercer County, New Jersey, US

Rosedale, New Jersey
- Unincorporated community
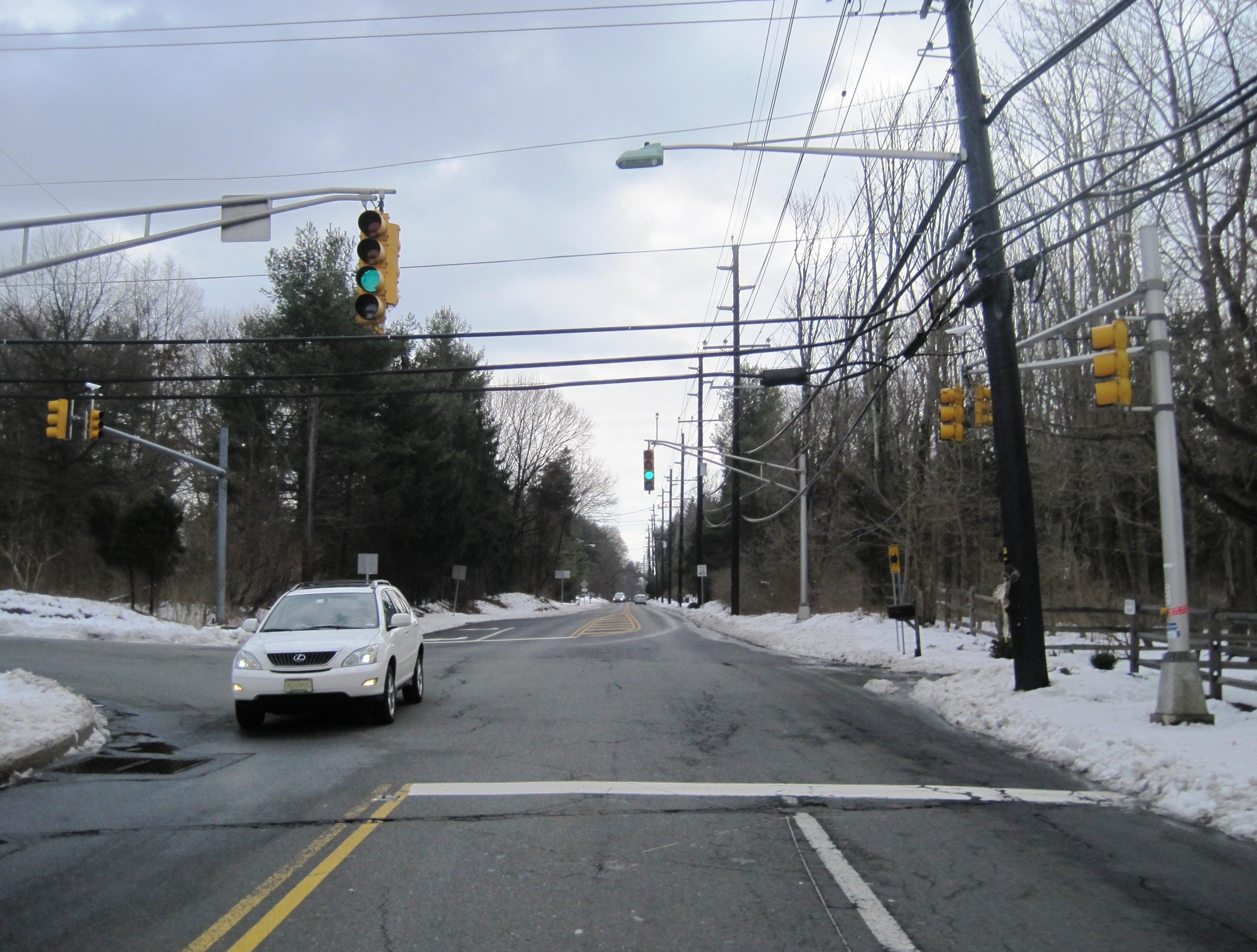
- Rosedale as seen from southbound Carter Road (CR 569)

- Location of Rosedale in Mercer County Inset: Location of county within the state of New Jersey Rosedale (New Jersey) Rosedale (the United States)
- Coordinates: 40°20′17″N 74°43′19″W
- Country: United States
- State: New Jersey
- County: Mercer
- Township: Lawrence
- Elevation: 177 ft (54 m)
- GNIS feature ID: 879817

Rosedale is an unincorporated community located within Lawrence Township in Mercer County, in the U.S. state of New Jersey. The community is centered on the intersection of Carter Road (County Route 569) and Rosedale Road (CR 604). Educational Testing Service's headquarters are located in the northeastern quadrant of the intersection.

Hunt Farmstead is located in Rosedale.
