= Dùn Ara =

Historic fort in Scotland

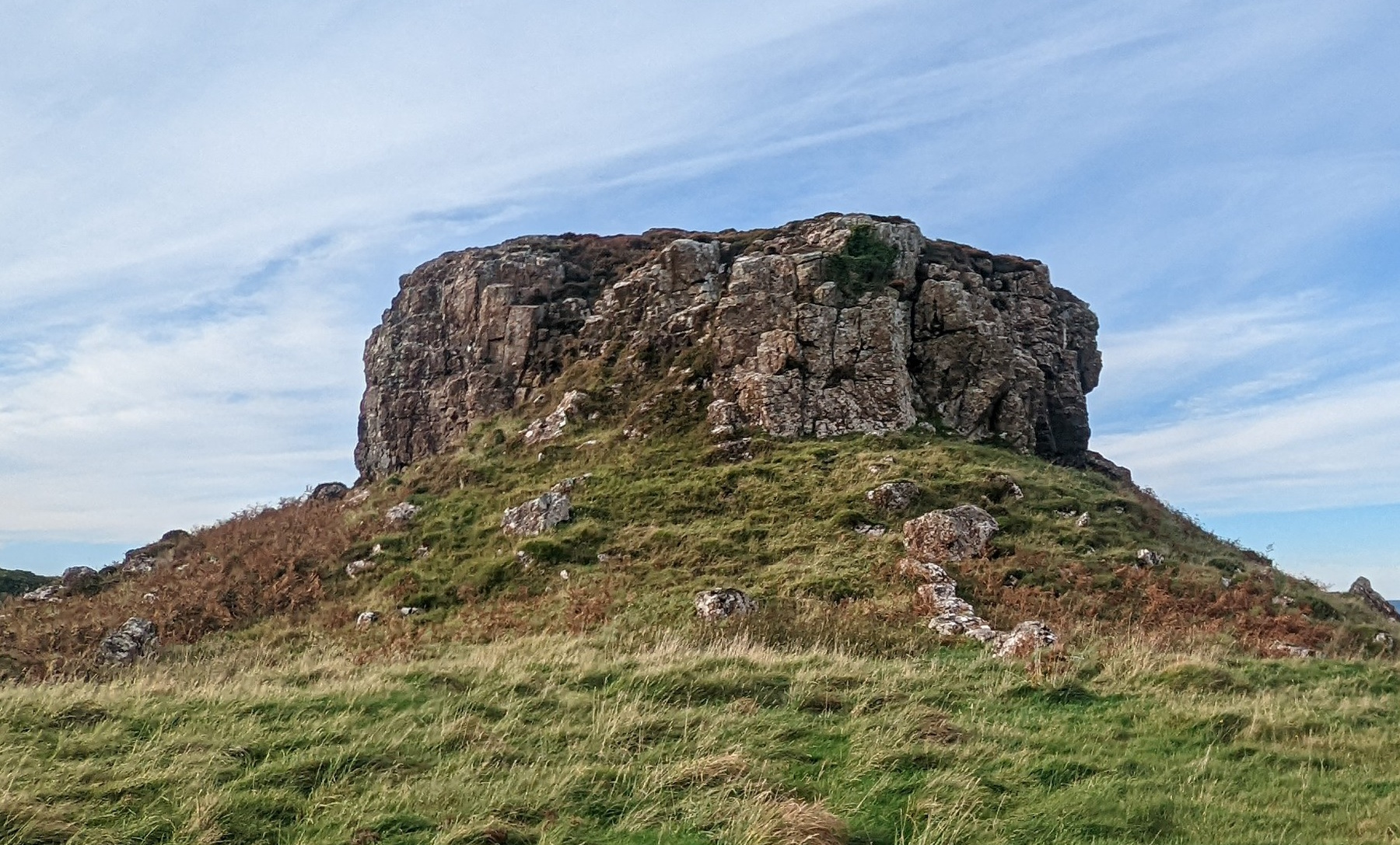
- The outcrop that Dùn Ara sits upon

- Location of Dùn Ara on Mull
- 56.6403°N 6.1978°W
- Location: Glengorm, Isle of Mull

History
- Built: before 1303

Dùn Ara, also known as Dùn Ara Castle or tautologically Dùn Ara Fort, is a ruined medieval castle and ancient dùn on the Isle of Mull, Argyll and Bute, Scotland. Located in Glengorm, 1.5 kilometres (1 mi) northwest of Glengorm Castle on a rocky outcrop at Sorne Point. The castle can be accessed only by sea and from a path leading from Glengorm Castle.

The castle overlooks the ocean towards Coll and Ardnamurchan, being situated on the northern coast of Mull. It is thought that the castle was situated well to defend the Bathing Pool, a man-made harbour possibly constructed before the castle's occupation, and that it may have seen use by the Norse. In medieval times until its abandonment in 1642, Clan MacKinnon had control over the castle and utilized it. It became a scheduled monument on 11 November 2003.
