= Loch Frisa =

Lake on the Isle of Mull, Inner Hebrides, Scotland

- Loch Friosa (Scottish Gaelic)
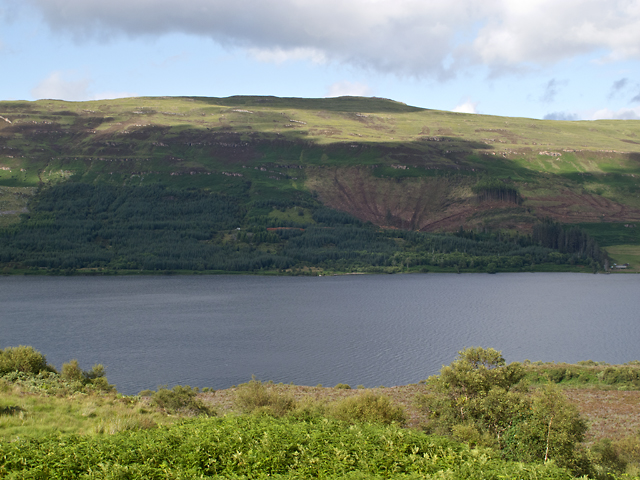
- Interactive map of Loch Frisa
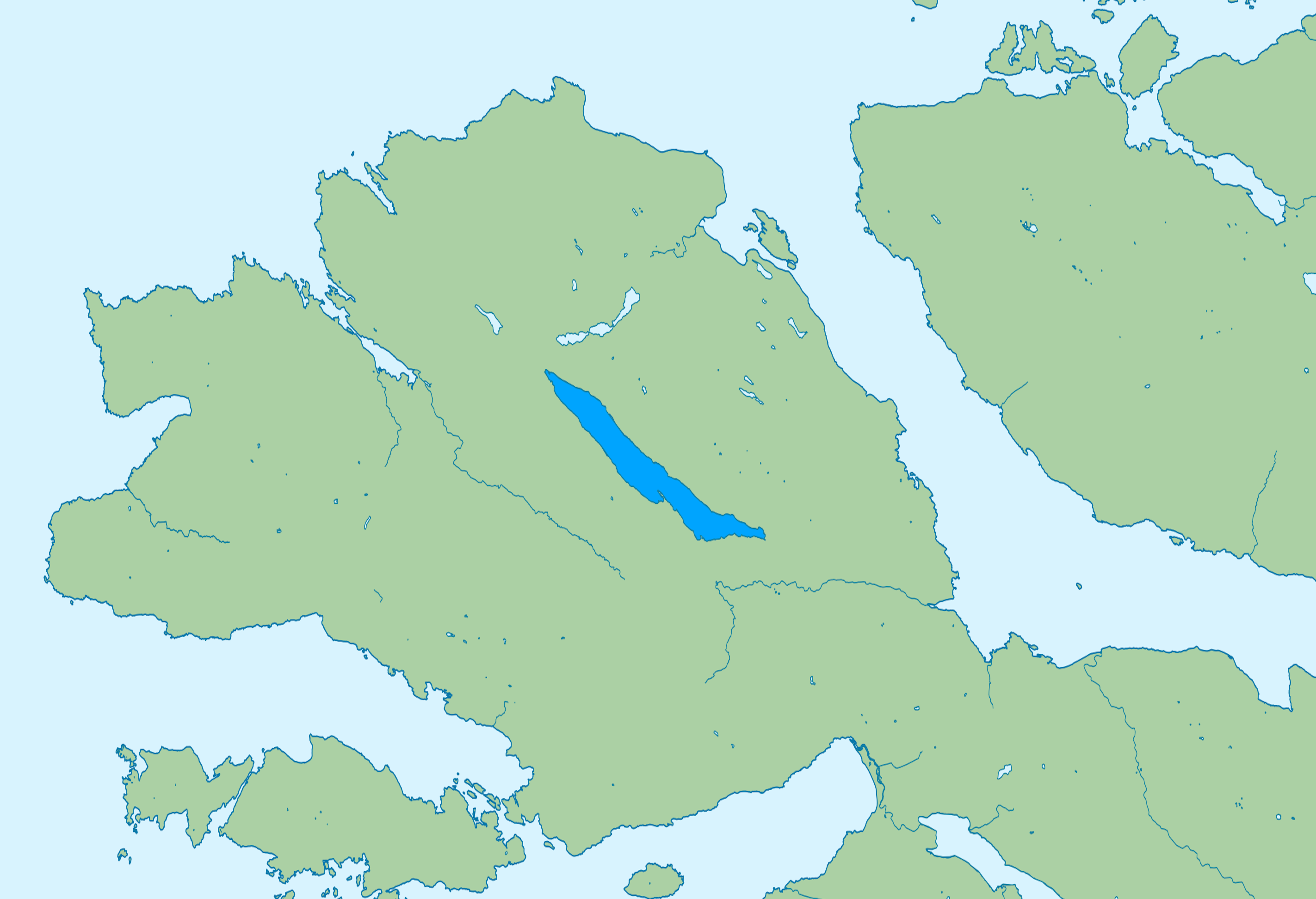
- Map of Loch Frisa
- Location: Isle of Mull, Inner Hebrides, Scotland
- Coordinates: 56.562439°N 6.097124°W
- Type: lake
- Surface area: 438 ha (1,080 acres)
- Average depth: 23.3 m (76 ft)
- Max. depth: 62.5 m (205 ft)
- Surface elevation: 76 m (249 ft)

Loch Frisa (Scottish Gaelic: Loch Friosa) is a loch on the Isle of Mull, Inner Hebrides, Scotland. It falls within the Argyll and Bute unitary authority area. The loch runs largely northwest to southeast. Its northwestern end is about halfway between Tobermory and Dervaig. It is the largest loch on the Isle of Mull and lies in the civil parish of Kilninian and Kilmore.

Loch Frisa is considered to be low-altitude, medium-alkalinity and generally deep. It is known for eagle watching.

The ship HMS Widemouth Bay was for some time named after Loch Frisa, and Caledonian Maritime Assets purchased a ferry in 2021 that they named MV Loch Frisa.
