= Hunt–Sitterding House =

Historic house in Virginia, United States

- U.S. National Register of Historic Places
- Virginia Landmarks Register
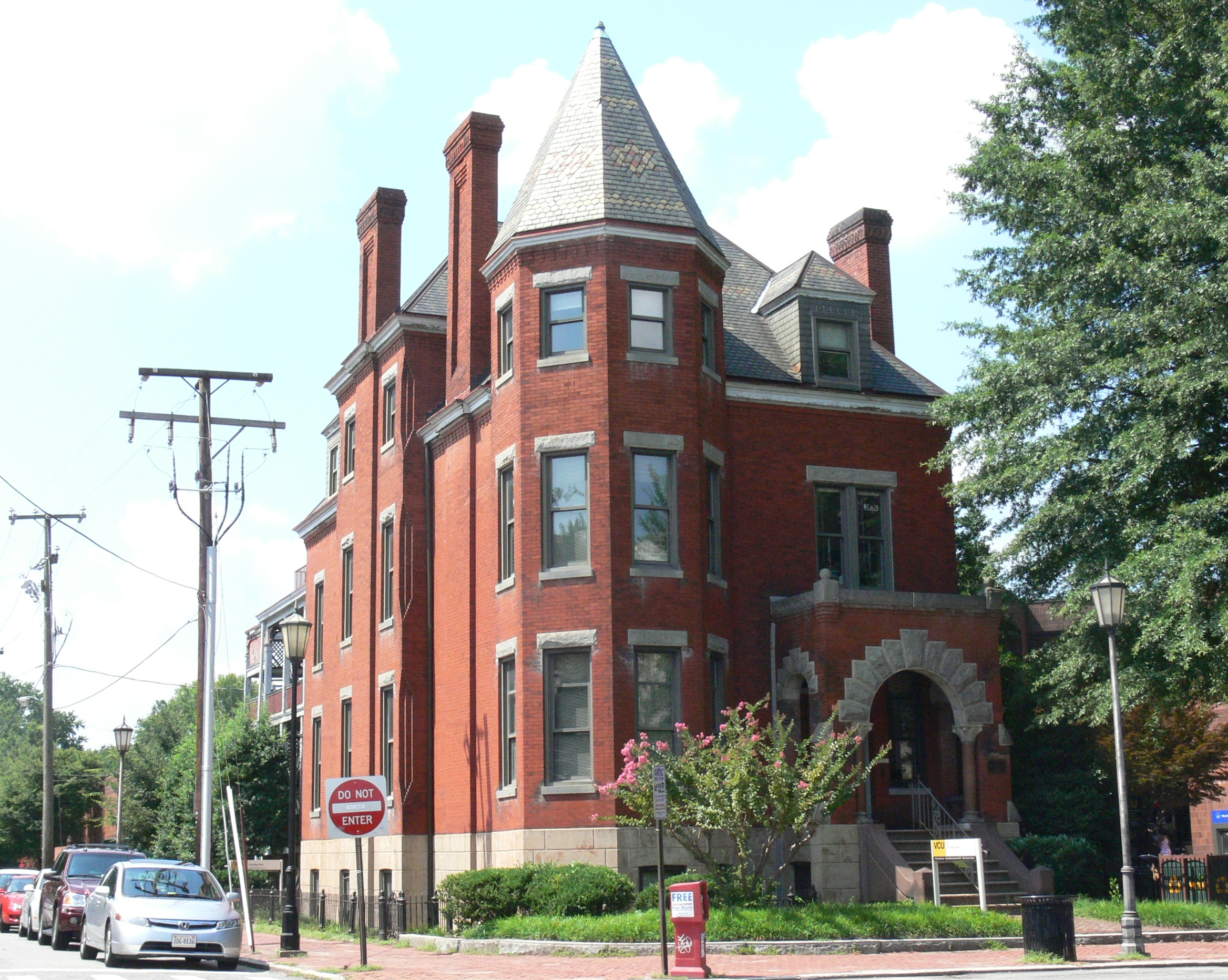
- Hunt–Sitterding House

- Location within Virginia
- Location: 901 Floyd Ave., Richmond, Virginia
- Coordinates: 37°32′49″N 77°27′11″W
- Area: Less than 1 acre (0.40 ha)
- Built: 1891
- Architectural style: Queen Anne and Romanesque Revival
- NRHP reference No.: 08000877
- VLR No.: 127-0202-0001

Significant dates
- Added to NRHP: September 12, 2008
- Designated VLR: June 19, 2008

The Hunt–Sitterding House, located at 901 Floyd Avenue in Richmond, Virginia, is a late Victorian era building originally constructed to serve as residence and office of the architect and contractor Gilbert J. Hunt Jr. (1843–1921).

It has been listed on the National Register of Historic Places since 2008.

== History ==
Built between 1889 and 1891, the Hunt–Sitterding House is a noteworthy example of Richmond's late 19th century town house architecture. Gilbert J. Hunt Jr. lived and worked from the house since its completion in 1891, up to his death in 1921. His widow Ella Hunt inherited the house, but she died the following year.

Richmond realtor Frederick Sitterding Jr. purchased the property from the Hunt estate in 1922. Like Hunt, Sitterding used the house as his office as well as residence.

The Virginia Commonwealth University acquired the house in 1975 from Edward and Edith Shaw and as of 2008 it was used as offices.

== Architecture ==
The house is an impressive example of the late Victorian era architectural style fashionable at the time of its construction. It displays influences of both the Queen Anne style architecture and Romanesque Revival. Despite renovations and alterations done to the interior of the house, some key elements have been preserved, such as the decorative main staircase, which retains its honey-brown natural oak finish. The exterior of the house remains vastly unchanged, with the exception of the backyard garden which has been turned into a parking lot.

The exterior of the house is clad in pressed red brick veneer, with rough-faced gray granite trims and window sills and lintels, and stucco foundation. Characteristic of its period, the house is vertically imposing, with a 3-story tower flanking its east side, topped by a steeply pointed octagonal roof. The original double front door is sheltered by a brick porch entered by a wide Romanesque arch. The roof has patterned slate decorations with touches of red and green. Because of its proximity to neighboring houses at the time of construction, the sides were left relatively plain, and this is evident on the west wall as it was never intended to be visible, with the neighbor house standing only a few meters from it. However, the six 3-story town houses also built by Hunt to the west of his house were all subsequently demolished.

The interior has suffered extensive renovations and alterations through the years, and while the main staircase remains intact, only fragments of the once richly decorated spaces remain. All interior spaces have been modernized, and the original layout of the rooms has been altered, but still some mantels and fireplaces remain as artifacts of significance, giving a notion of the splendor once showcased by the interior.
