= Hunt-Phelan House =

Historic house in Tennessee, United States

- U.S. National Register of Historic Places
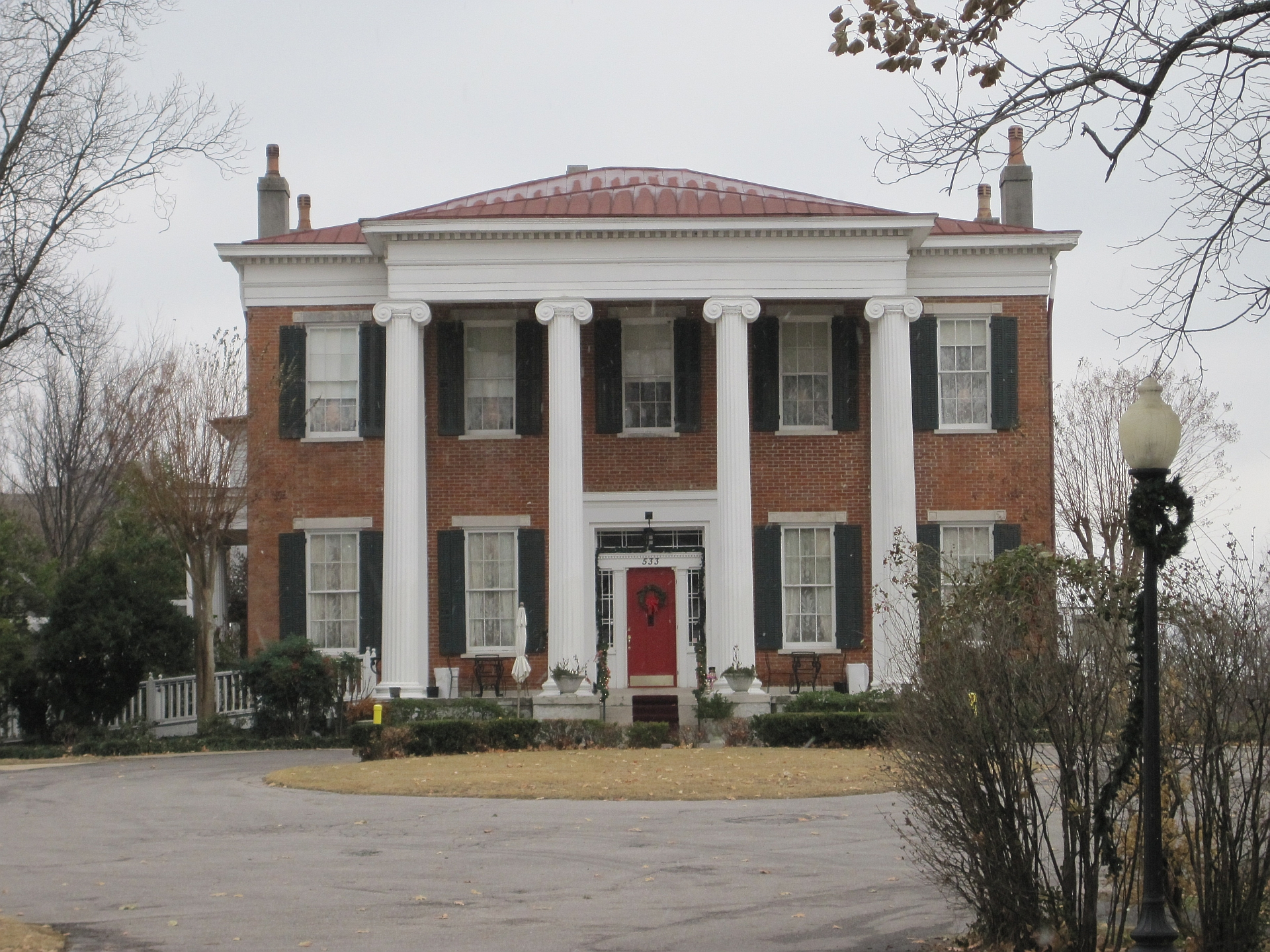
- The Hunt-Phelan House in 2010

- Location within Tennessee Location within the United States
- Location: 533 Beale Ave., Memphis, Tennessee
- Coordinates: 35°8′15″N 90°2′38″W
- Area: 9 acres (3.6 ha)
- Built: 1830
- Architectural style: Federal
- NRHP reference No.: 71000834
- Added to NRHP: February 11, 1971

The Hunt-Phelan House is a historic mansion in Memphis, Tennessee, USA.

== History ==
The two-story mansion was built circa 1830 for George H. Whyett. It was designed in the Federal architectural style. It was expanded in 1855. Prior to the war, Jefferson Davis visited the house as a guest.

During the American Civil War, the mansion was used as headquarters by Union General Ulysses S. Grant, followed by Confederate General Leonidas Polk.

After the war, Davis returned to the house as a guest. Later, President Andrew Johnson was also a guest.

== Architectural significance ==
It has been listed on the National Register of Historic Places since February 11, 1971.
