= Hunt House (Searcy, Arkansas) =

Historic house in Arkansas, United States

- U.S. National Register of Historic Places
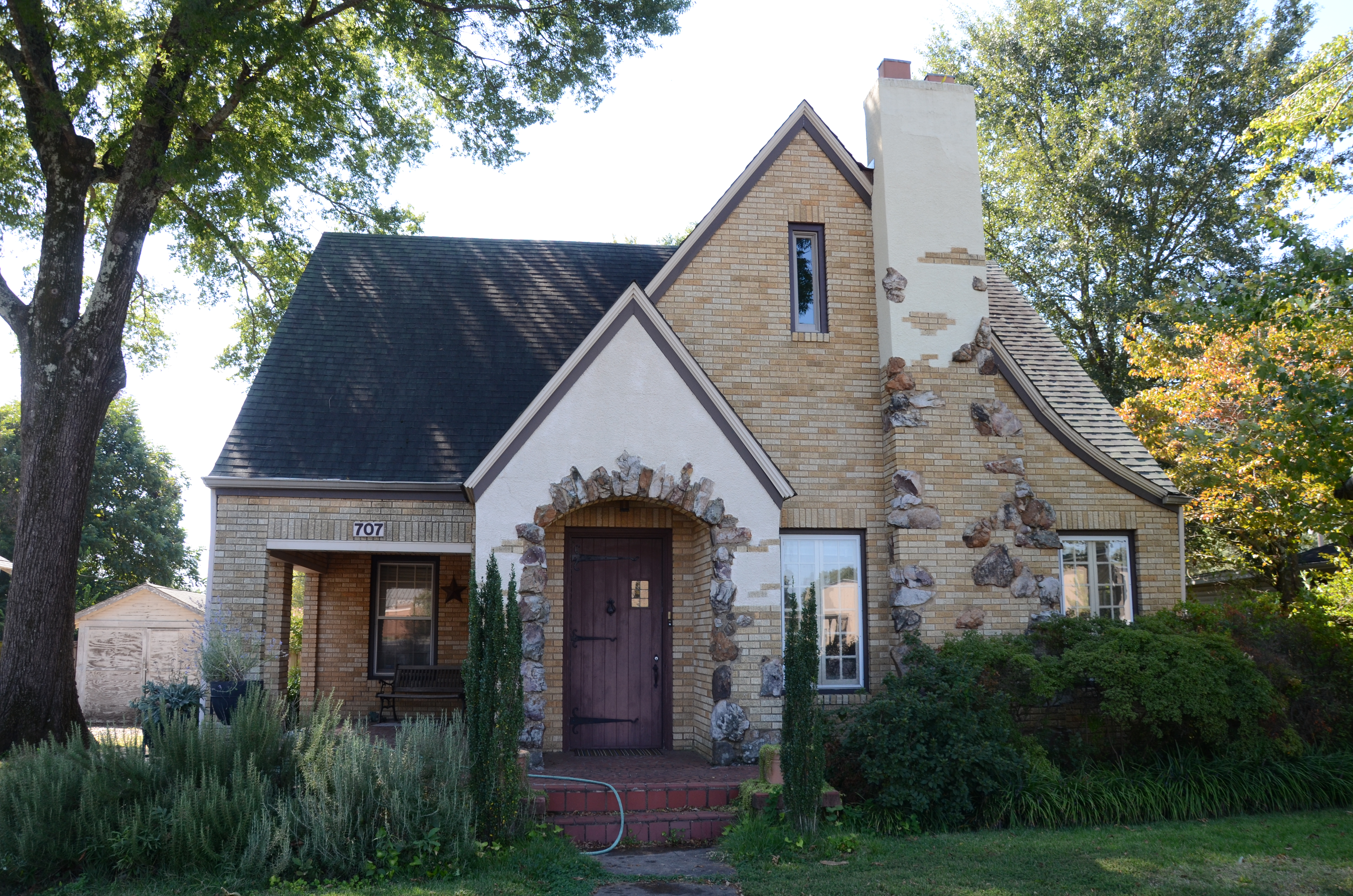

- Location within Arkansas Location within the United States
- Location: 707 W. Center St., Searcy, Arkansas
- Coordinates: 35°14′54″N 91°44′41″W
- Area: less than one acre
- Built: 1935
- Architectural style: Late 19th And 20th Century Revivals, English Revival
- MPS: White County MPS
- NRHP reference No.: 91001207
- Added to NRHP: September 13, 1991

The Hunt House is a historic house at 707 West Center Street in Searcy, Arkansas. It is a 1 1/2-story wood-frame house, its exterior finished in brick, stucco, stone, and other materials. It is roughly T-shaped, with intersecting gable-roofed sections. The front-facing gable has the entry porch projecting from its left front, and a chimney to its right. Both are formed out of brick with randomly placed stone at the lower levels, and stuccoed brick at the upper levels. Built about 1935, it is one of Searcy's finer examples of English Revival architecture.

The house was listed on the National Register of Historic Places in 1991.

== See also ==
- National Register of Historic Places listings in White County, Arkansas
