= David Hunt Three-Decker =

- U.S. National Register of Historic Places
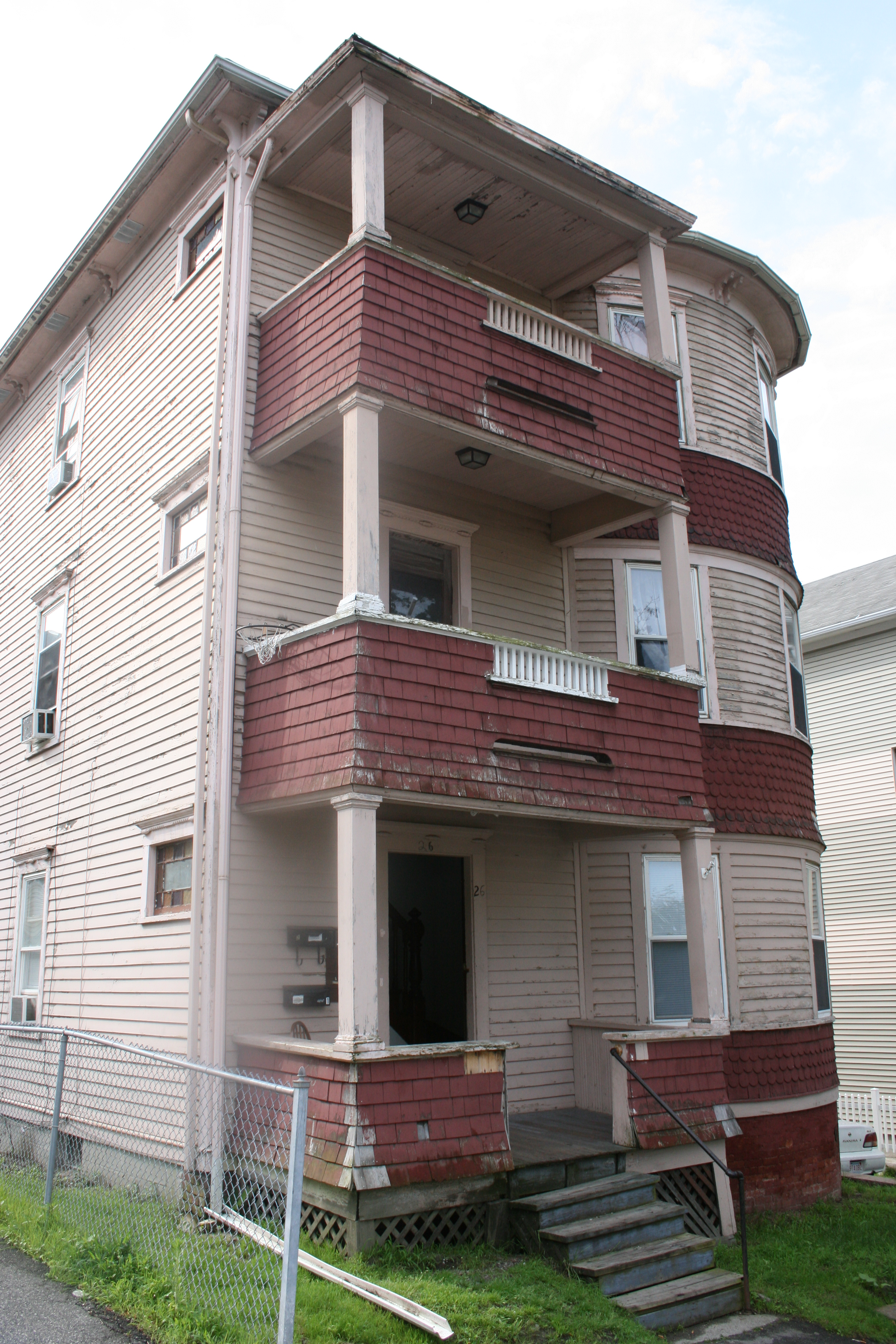

- Location within Massachusetts Location within the United States
- Location: 26 Louise St., Worcester, Massachusetts
- Coordinates: 42°14′28″N 71°47′46″W
- Area: less than one acre
- Built: c. 1900
- Architectural style: Queen Anne
- MPS: Worcester Three-Deckers TR
- NRHP reference No.: 89002412
- Added to NRHP: February 9, 1990

The David Hunt Three-Decker is a historic triple decker in Worcester, Massachusetts. Built about 1900, it is a well-preserved example of the building type with Queen Anne Victorian features. It was listed on the National Register of Historic Places in 1990.

== Description and history ==
The David Hunt Three-Decker is located in Worcester's southeastern Vernon Hill neighborhood, on the east side of Louise Street. It is a three-story frame structure, covered by a hip roof and a combination of wooden clapboards and decorative scalloped shingles. The roof has extended eaves adorned with Italianate brackets. The front facade has a stack of porches on the left side, and a rounded window bay on the right, with bands of decorative shingles separating the floors. The porches have shingled skirts with a section of short balustrade at the center, and are supported by square columns with simple capitals. The right side of the building has a projecting jog that extends to the rear; at the end of this section is a back entrance, sheltered by a portico with turned posts.

The well-preserved Queen Anne Victorian was built c. 1900, during an early period of development in the Vernon Hill area. The area where it was built, on the southern slope of the hill, was populated at the time mainly by Irish immigrants working in the city's wire factories. David Hunt, the first owner, was employed as a wire worker.

== See also ==
- National Register of Historic Places listings in eastern Worcester, Massachusetts
