= Hunt Farmstead =

- U.S. National Register of Historic Places
- New Jersey Register of Historic Places
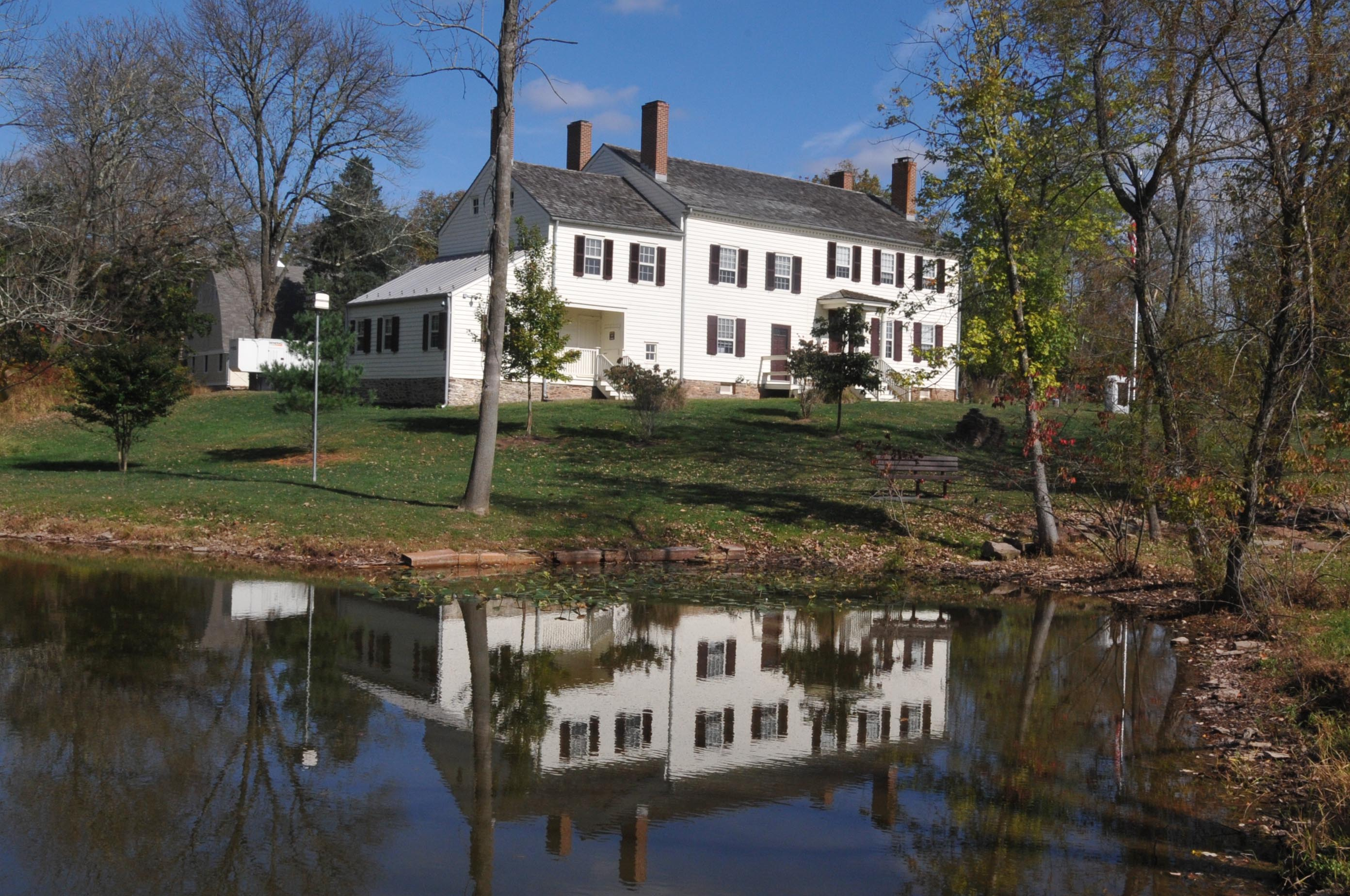
- Rosedale Park Headquarters

- Location within Mercer County, New Jersey Location within New Jersey Location within the United States
- Location: 197 Blackwell Road, Rosedale, New Jersey
- Coordinates: 40°19′43.1″N 74°44′42.7″W
- Area: 12 acres (4.9 ha)
- NRHP reference No.: 87002555
- NJRHP No.: 1690

Significant dates
- Added to NRHP: October 28, 1988
- Designated NJRHP: December 3, 1987

The Hunt Farmstead is a historic farmhouse on a 12-acre (4.9 ha) farmstead at 197 Blackwell Road in the Rosedale section of Hopewell Township on the border with Lawrence Township in Mercer County, New Jersey, United States. It was added to the National Register of Historic Places on October 28, 1988, for its significance in architecture and exploration/settlement. The house is now the headquarters of the Mercer County Park Commission and is located in the Rosedale Park section of the Mercer Meadows park system.

== History and description ==
According to the nomination form, the oldest part of the house was constructed c. 1760–1790 and was owned by Noah Hunt (c. 1724–1805). It remained in the Hunt family until 1922, when it was sold to Fernando Blackwell. In 1968, the Blackwell family sold the property to Mercer County. It then became part of Rosedale Park.

== See also ==
- National Register of Historic Places listings in Mercer County, New Jersey
