= Thomas Hunt House =

Historic house in Arkansas, United States

- U.S. National Register of Historic Places
- Location within Arkansas Location within the United States
- Nearest city: Plainview, Arkansas
- Coordinates: 35°20′1″N 91°40′35″W
- Area: less than one acre
- Built: 1885
- Architect: Thomas Hunt
- Architectural style: Vernacular double pen
- MPS: White County MPS
- NRHP reference No.: 91001193
- Added to NRHP: July 22, 1992

The Thomas Hunt House was a historic house in rural White County, Arkansas. It was located north of Plainview, on the east side of Arkansas Highway 157, just south of County Road 704. It was a single-story wood frame double-pen structure, with a gabled roof and a projecting front gable with a wraparound porch supported by chamfered posts. Built about 1885, it was a rare surviving example of the double-pen frame form, prior to its destruction by fire in 2015.

The house was listed on the National Register of Historic Places in 1992.

== See also ==
- National Register of Historic Places listings in White County, Arkansas
