= Parley Hunt House =

Historic house in Nevada, United States

- U.S. National Register of Historic Places
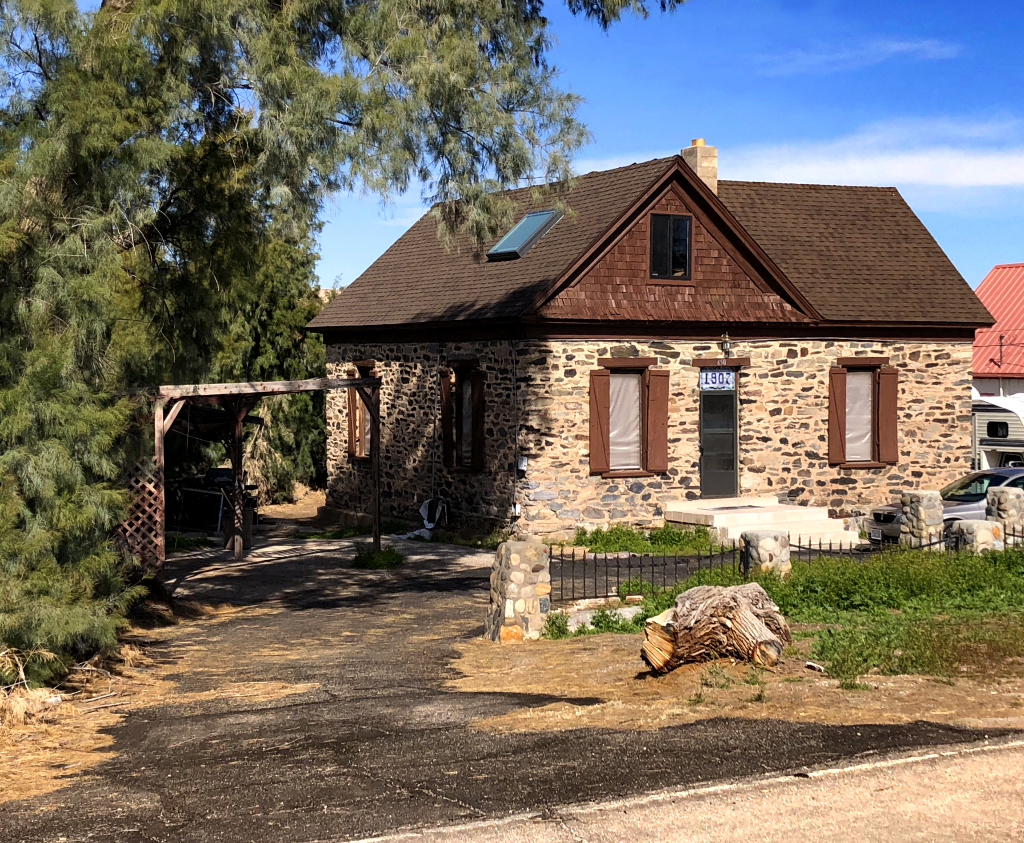

- Location within Nevada Location within the United States
- Location: Canal Street near junction with Virgin Street, Bunkerville, Nevada
- Coordinates: 36°46′32″N 114°6′59″W
- Area: less than one acre
- Built: 1907
- Architect: Parley Hunt
- Architectural style: Vernacular hall & parlor
- NRHP reference No.: 91001652
- Added to NRHP: November 14, 1991

Parley Hunt House is a historic home in Bunkerville, Nevada which was listed on the National Register of Historic Places in 1991.

It is a one-story stone hall and parlor plan house built by Parley Hunt in 1907, for use by himself and his mother. It was originally a three-room L-shaped house, with a rear room used for cooking.

== Description ==
The Parley Hunt House is situated in Bunkerville, Nevada which is a village close to the Utah border. The village houses one thousand people and it is eighty miles northeast of Las Vegas. At the Bunkerville plat, it is located on tract thirty seven, section twenty five. The house is placed on Canal Street, it is named so because of the irrigation canal that runs alongside it.

Surrounded on three sides by a chain link fence, the house is built on a site of 0.824 acre. Though the Parley Hunt House is in fine state, it retains only a middling degree of integrity on account of large-scale upgradation. On the site, there are 3 non-contributing buildings which consist of 1 small, single story gable-roofed wood frame dwelling to the east of the house, and 2 wooden sheds on the western border of the site. It also has a lawn and quite a few fruit trees to the north of the residence. The structure has nouvelle aluminum windows, a composition roof, a plastic bubble skylight and an updated interior. It possesses a modernized version of concrete block fireplace as well which is in between the 2 south, front rooms on the interior. In the southeast room, a fashionable kitchen has been built. Currently, the loft is opened up over the south-west room. It has a couple of loft bedrooms. The back, northwest room has been bisected into a bedroom, bath and corridor.

== History and Context ==
Parley Smith Hunt stayed in the house till 1915. Prior to the 1950s, no less than 3 owners were changed when Mr. Freeman bought and refashioned the Parley Hunt House. Mr. Freeman changed the design of the loft as described in the previous section. Also the kitchen was appended by him during this modification. The structure was first completed by Mr. Parley with 3 rooms including the room at the back which was used as a kitchen. It had a big fireplace between the 2 rooms of the front. The stove of the back room was linked to a 2nd chimney. The redesign activities were continued by the 2 following owners Dan Eastman and Nick Bartlett. The redecoration process included the change of windows from wood to aluminum, and also from the first fireplace to the concrete block. A tiny living place to the east of the main structure was constructed by Bartlett for his son. The modification made by the present owners of the Parley Hunt House includes the insert of insulation and gypsum board to walls and ceilings the changes at the roof.
