= Hunt House (St. Charles, Illinois) =

Historic house in Illinois, United States

- U.S. National Register of Historic Places
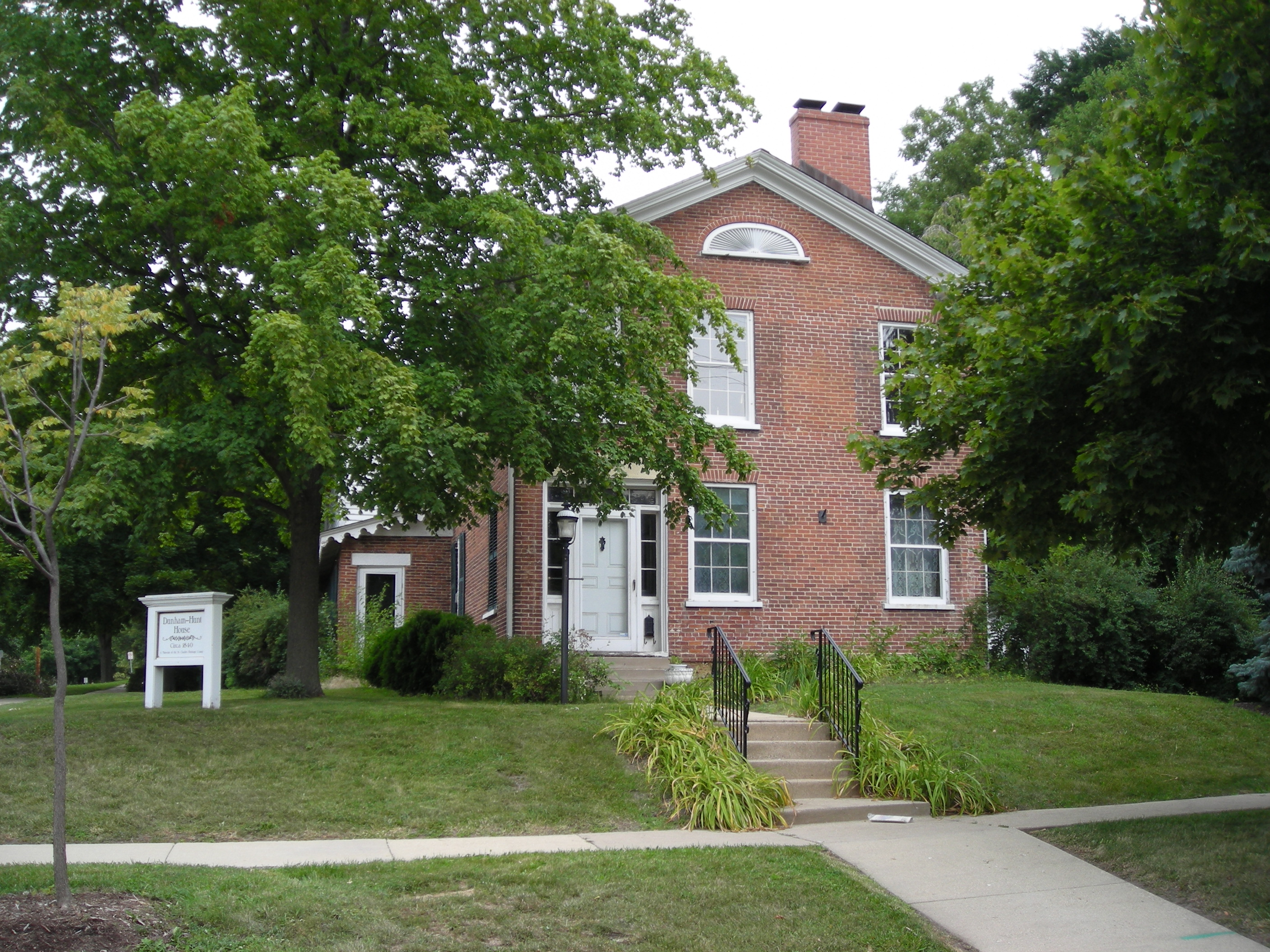
- Location: 304 Cedar Ave., St Charles, Kane County, Illinois, United States
- Coordinates: 41°54′54.13″N 88°18′37.77″W
- Built: 1841
- Architectural style: Greek Revival
- NRHP reference No.: 82000397
- Added to NRHP: November 12, 1982

The Hunt House, formerly the Dunham–Hunt Museum, is a Registered Historic Place credited as being the oldest brick residence in St. Charles, Illinois.

== History ==
Bela Thaxter Hunt was born in Abington, Massachusetts in 1812. He left the state in 1833 and settled in Illinois' Fox River valley in 1836. Hunt's brother was indirectly responsible for the decision to establish a settlement in the area now known as St Charles. Bela Hunt was instrumental in expanding the town, purchasing a lot of over 200 acres (81 ha) (the rest of the settlement totaled only 25 acres (10 ha)). Hunt oversaw the construction of the town's first frame building in 1836, and bought a small hotel in 1837, where the first election in St. Charles took place. He also built several other businesses in the downtown area, and was a bed salesmen in nearby Chicago. In 1841, he was elected the first Kane County Treasurer. Later that year, he established a linseed oil factory.

Hunt constructed this residence in 1841 from local brick from Penny's Brickyard (modern day Baker Park). In 1844, he entered the paper industry, building the first paper mill northwest of the Ohio River, eventually employing over 80 people. Hunt opened a tannery in 1850 and manufactured harnesses, boots, and shoes. For the latter part of his life, until 1890, he ran a hardware business. Hunt served as a major in the Civil War. Hunt died on October 23, 1908. Bela Hunt's son Frank B. Hunt later served as the third mayor of St. Charles, and his grandson Edwin M. Hunt was the eleventh mayor.

The Hunt family owned the house until 1980, and left much of the original flooring, trim, windows, doors, siding, and hardware intact. The only significant change made over the years was the addition of a clapboard structure to the back of the house. The last Hunts to reside in the house were Miss Effie Hunt and her sister, Mrs. Eva Lacy. The house was eventually sold by William and Bradley Hunt Gunter to Jane Dunham to keep it from being demolished.

The house was threatened with demolition when Baker Memorial Methodist Church sought to expand its parking area. Jane Dunham (from another early Kane County family), who had a passion for historic preservation, bought the building in order to save it from destruction in 1980. Dunham was also helped to get the Hunt House listed on the National Register of Historic Places in 1982.

After a restoration, the first floor was opened as a museum. It was listed on the National Register of Historic Places in 1982, and donated to the city of St. Charles in 1986. In the 2010s, the city could no longer afford to pay for upkeep and maintenance, and placed the property up for sale.

== Architecture ==
The house was the initially in St. Charles to be constructed out of brick (other houses were wooden frame or log cabins). It is on the northwest corner of Third and Cedar Streets and was built in the Greek Revival style. The house remains consistent with original design due to the long span of time that it was in the possession of the Hunt family. The Hunt House is rectangular with a gable roof. The entrances on the front and rear are consistent with Greek Revival high style. Additions on the side and rear were added before 1855. A second story was added to the one-story addition before 1920, probably in the 1870s. Details on the fascia suggest Gothic Revival influence. The interior floor plan has not changed substantially since construction.

== Notes ==
- St. Charles Heritage Center
- National Register of Historic Places nomination form: Hunt House
