= E. F. Hunt House =

Historic building in Meridian, Idaho

- U.S. National Register of Historic Places
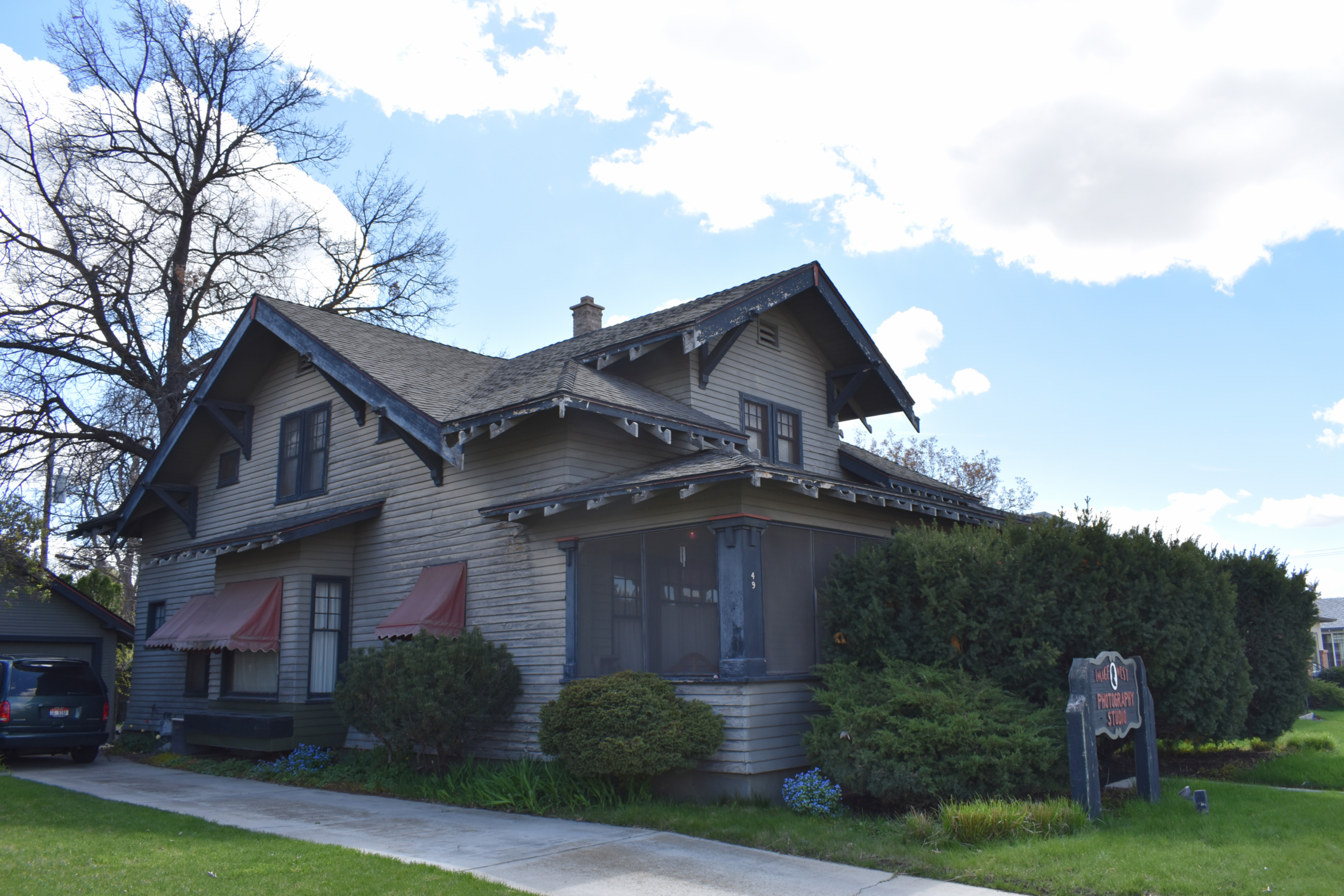
- The E.F. Hunt House in 2019

- Location within Idaho Location within the United States
- Location: 49 E. State, Meridian, Idaho
- Coordinates: 43°36′46″N 116°23′29″W
- Area: less than one acre
- Built: 1913
- Built by: Davidson Bros.
- Architect: Tourtellotte & Hummel
- Architectural style: Bungalow/craftsman
- MPS: Tourtellotte and Hummel Architecture TR
- NRHP reference No.: 82000210
- Added to NRHP: November 17, 1982

The E.F. Hunt House in Meridian, Idaho, USA, is a 1½-story Craftsman bungalow designed by Tourtellotte & Hummel and constructed in 1913. The house has an unusual roof design, with a lateral ridge beam extending beyond left and right gables, hip roofs on either side of a prominent, front facing gable, and a lower hip roof above a cross facade porch. Double notch rafters project from lateral eaves and from cantilevered window bays with shed roofs below the side facing gables. Narrow clapboard siding covers exterior walls. The front porch is supported by square posts with geometric, dropped caps. Tourtellotte & Hummel had used the square post decorations in other Bungalow houses, and a more elaborate example is found on the porch of the William Sidenfaden House (1912) in Boise. The house was added to the National Register of Historic Places in 1982.

== Ernest F. Hunt ==
Ernest F. Hunt (September 17, 1871—October 16, 1933) moved from Boise to Meridian in 1908, purchasing the mercantile business of L.K. Deck on Broadway Avenue. A 1913 fire at the business destroyed most of Hunt's inventory, but he temporarily reopened the store at Meridian's I.O.O.F. building.

The Hunt family moved into their 8-room bungalow in 1913, and a year later Hunt leased a 160-acre ranch five miles from Meridian, owned by the Riedel Brothers.

In 1915, Hunt and his partner Robert Pfost organized the Meridian Produce Company. Pfost later married Hunt's daughter, Hazel. In 1923, Hunt and Pfost organized the Meridian Produce and Cold Storage Company, a poultry processing plant with a daily capacity of 15,000 chickens.

The Hunts leased the C.L. Dutton House in 1920, but they may have continued to own the E.F. Hunt House, and they remodeled a house in 1925. In 1932, they had returned to Boise and were living at the Alo-ha Apartments on Idaho Street. Ernest Hunt died in 1933.
