= Dervaig =

Coordinates: 56.588°N 6.183°W

Dervaig: Scottish Gaelic: Dearbhaig
- Village
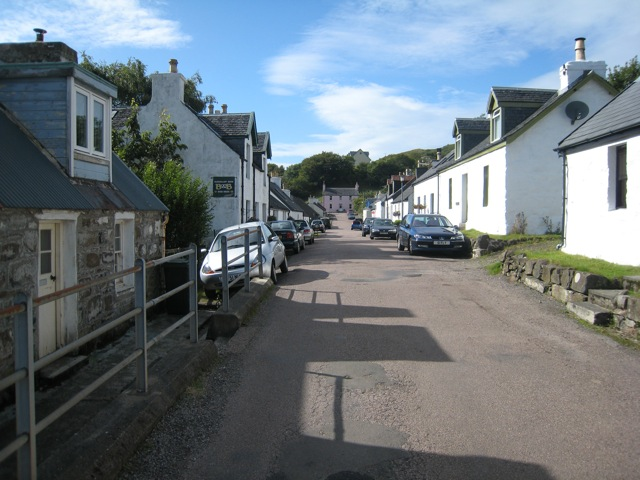
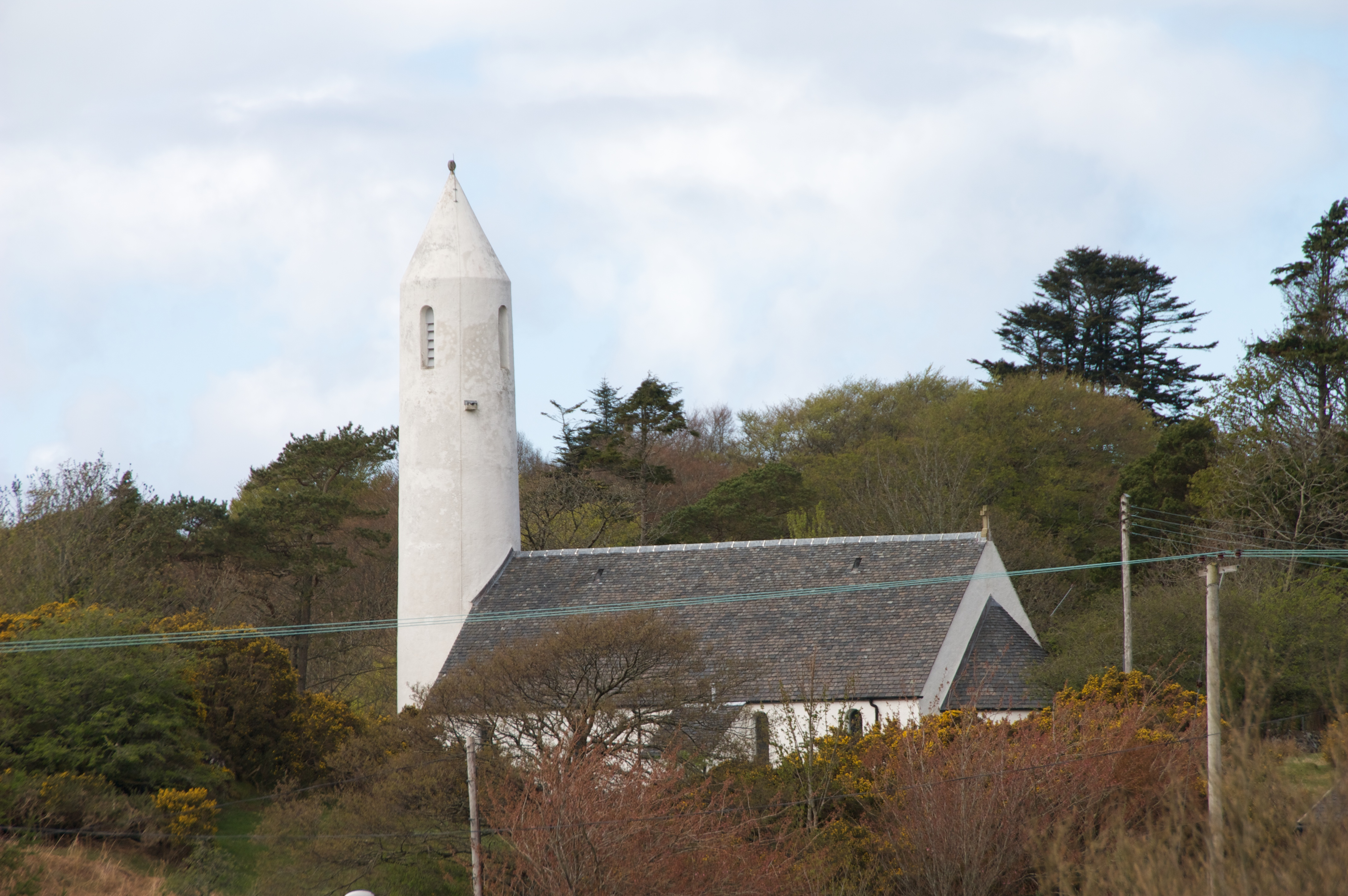
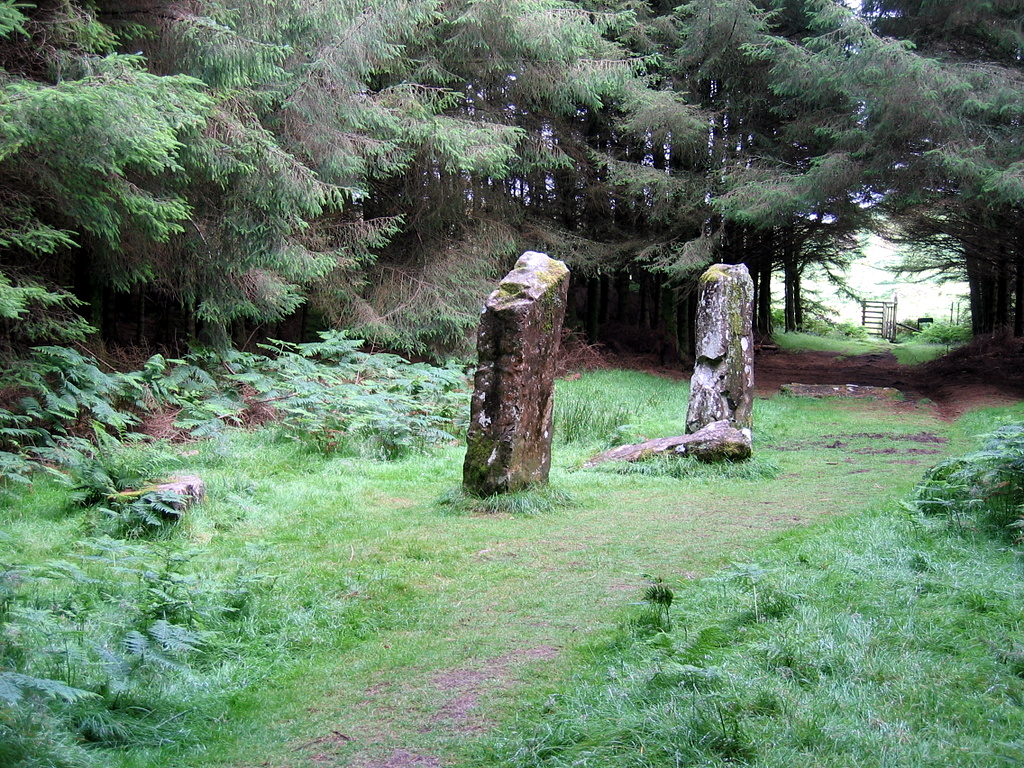
- Looking down the main street Kilmore Church Standing stones near Dervaig

- Location within Argyll and Bute
- OS grid reference: NM432518
- Community council: Mull
- Council area: Argyll and Bute
- Lieutenancy area: Argyll and Bute
- Country: Scotland
- Sovereign state: United Kingdom
- Post town: ISLE OF MULL
- Postcode district: PA75 6
- Dialling code: 01688
- Police: Scotland
- Fire: Scottish
- Ambulance: Scottish
- UK Parliament: Argyll, Bute and South Lochaber
- Scottish Parliament: Argyll and Bute

Dervaig (Note: Scottish Gaelic: Dearbhaig) is a small village on the Isle of Mull off the west coast of Scotland. The village is within the parish of Kilninian and Kilmore, and is situated on the B8073 roughly midway between Tobermory and Calgary. In 1961 it had a population of 82. A 2011 census estimated the population had risen to ~200.

== Toponymy ==
Both the English name Dervaig and the Gaelic name Dearbhaig are derived from the Old Norse Dervig, meaning "Good inlet", referring to Loch a' Chumhainn, which the town sits on.

== Church ==
The town is known for its unusual round-towered church Kilmore Church. The original church was built in 1755, however, there is not a complete description of it in the records, so it is unknown what it looked like. It was built to replace the nearby Church of Kilcolmkil and is thought to be very similar to the church of Kilninian which was built at a similar time but still stands.

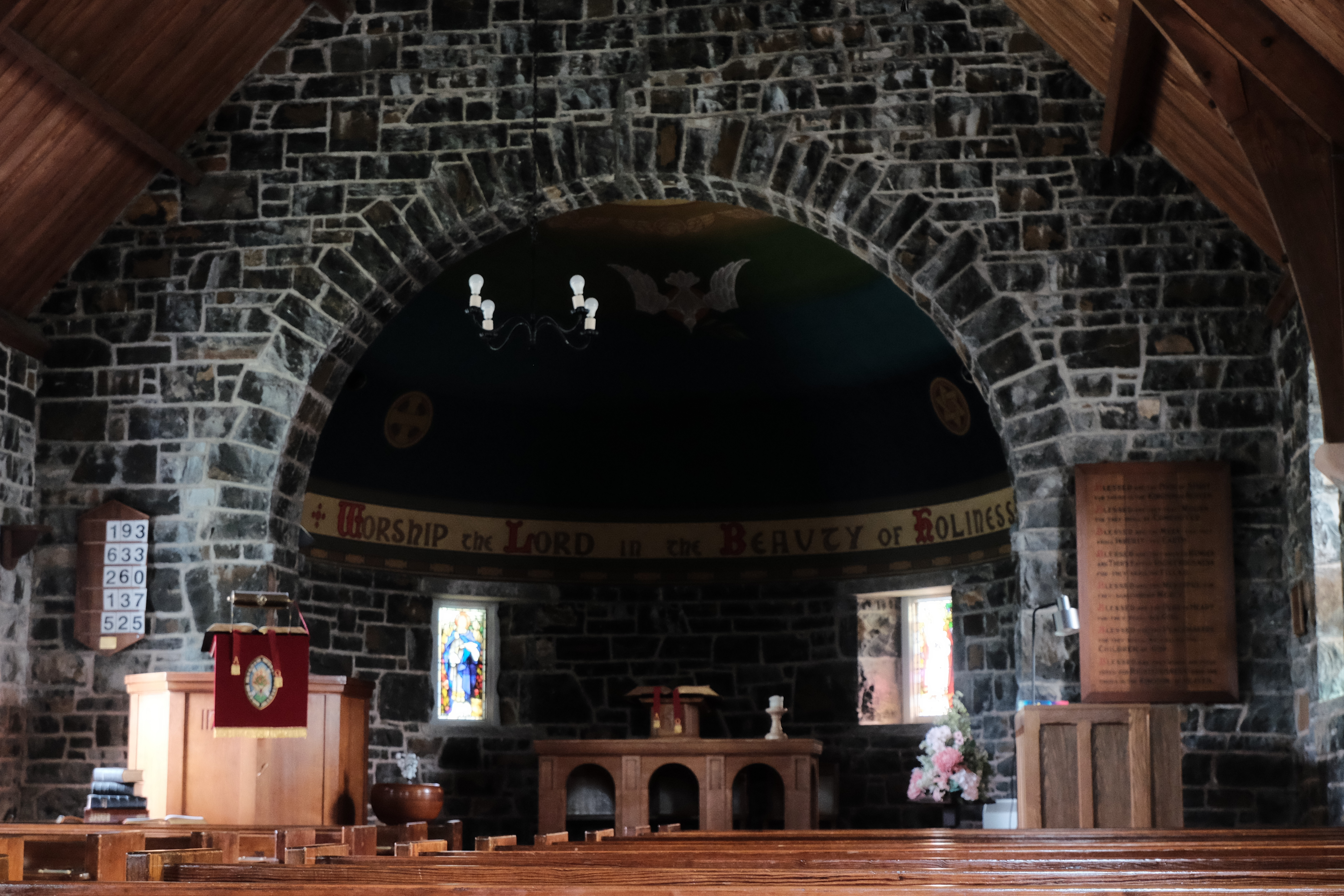
Interior of Kilmore Parish Church in 2024

The existing church was built in 1905, being designed by Glasgow architect Peter MacGregor Chalmers with stained glass by Stephen Adam. The "pencil" shape design of the tower is an uncommon sight nowadays in Scotland, however many similar churches still survive in Ireland. The church was renovated in 2004.

== Other sites ==
The Bellachroy Hotel is the Isle of Mull's oldest inn, dating back to 1608. The main street of the town was planned and established by Alexander Mclean of Coll in 1799.
