= Éphrem-A. Brisebois =

Canadian politician, soldier, and police officer (1850–1890)

Personal details
- Born: March 7, 1850 South Durham, Canada East
- Died: February 13, 1890 (aged 39) Winnipeg, Manitoba, Canada
- Party: Conservative

Military service
- Branch/service: Union Army; North-West Mounted Police
- Battles/wars: American Civil War; North-West Rebellion

Éphrem-A. Brisebois (March 7, 1850 – February 13, 1890) was a Canadian politician, soldier, and police officer with the North-West Mounted Police (NWMP) of Canada.

== Early life ==
Brisebois was born 7 March 1850 at South Durham, Canada East, now Durham-Sud. He was fluently bilingual in English and French. At 15, he dropped out of school to fight for the Union Army in the American Civil War and went on to spend a further three years serving in Italy with the volunteer unit "Devils of the Good Lord". Upon his return to Canada he worked on the first census in Canada.

== Career ==
In 1873, Brisebois was chosen by John A. Macdonald, because of his military experience (and Conservative politics), to be one of nine commanding officers with the new NWMP. He distinguished himself as a trainer, and showed remarkable foresight by attempting to enforce strict restrictions on buffalo hunting (over-hunting, among other reasons, led to a massive decline in the buffalo population). However, he was criticized for an inability to maintain discipline among his men, and his decision to take a common-law Métis wife. As his division's insubordination reached near-mutiny proportions, he clashed more and more with his direct superior James Farquharson Macleod. On Macleod's suggestion, Fort Brisebois was renamed to Fort Calgary (now Calgary, Alberta) in June 1876, and Brisebois resigned in August.

Brisebois traveled 1200 kilometres to Winnipeg. Eventually, he returned to Quebec, and helped a Conservative candidate, Désiré-Olivier Bourbeau defeat a Liberal cabinet minister named Wilfrid Laurier (the future Prime Minister). In 1880, he was made the registrar of land titles, and assigned to Minnedosa, Manitoba.

== Personal life ==
Brisebois and his wife Adelle (whom he had legally married sometime after resigning from the NWMP) led an active social life, founding a snowshoe club and holding Roman Catholic church services in their home. During the North-West Rebellion of 1885, he helped mobilize militia units and later joined the 65th Battalion, Mount Royal Rifles.

He died of a heart attack in Winnipeg in 1890, and was buried in St. Boniface, Manitoba.
