= Calgary Castle =

Coordinates: 56°34′50.17″N 6°16′13.9″W

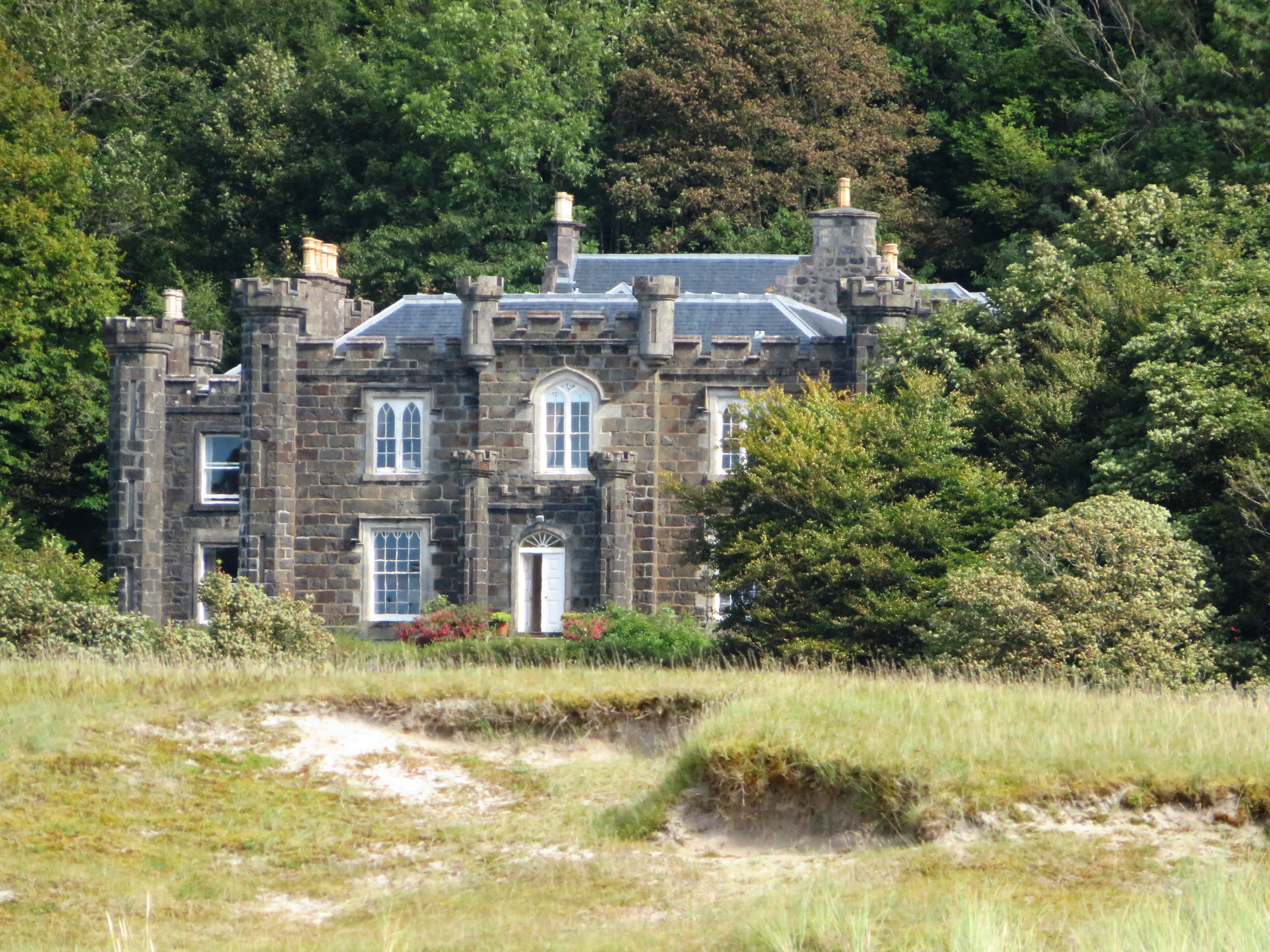
- The castle in 2018

- Location within Mull
- Interactive map of Calgary Castle
- Location: Calgary, Mull

History
- Built: 1817–23
- Built for: Captain Alan MacAskill

Listed Building – Category B
- Designated: 20 July 1971
- Reference no.: LB11010

Calgary Castle, also known as Calgary House, is a 19th-century castellated Gothic mansion at Calgary on the Isle of Mull, Scotland. The mansion faces Calgary Bay on the west coast of the island, around 13 kilometres (8 miles) from Tobermory. It is a category B listed building.

== History ==
The house was built by Captain Alan MacAskill (1765–1828), who bought the land in 1817 and completed the house by 1823. Around 1870 the house was acquired by John Munro Mackenzie, and was subsequently extended to the east, away from the coast. Calgary Castle was later owned by Colonel Eric and Elizabeth Mackenzie from 1948 until the 1970s, and they planted over 150 species of rhododendron, azaleas and exotic plants, and created the woodland garden which still stands.

Fort Calgary in Canada, from which the present city of Calgary developed, was named after Calgary Castle.
