= Glengorm Castle =

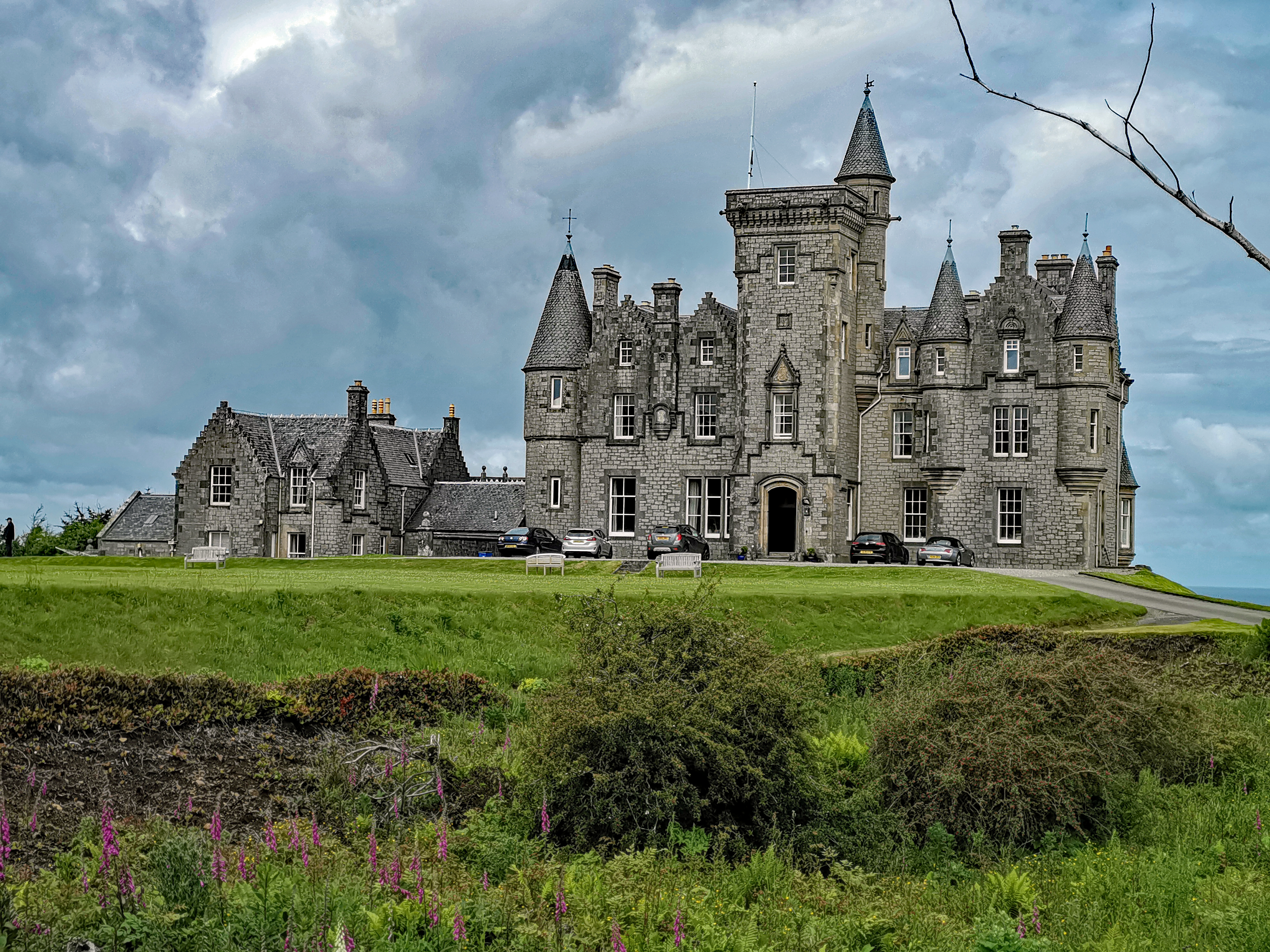
- Glengorm Castle in 2019

- Location of Glengorm Castle on Mull
- 56.6368°N 6.1773°W
- Location: Glengorm, Isle of Mull

History
- Built: 1860
- Built for: James Forsyth of Quinish

Site notes
- Architect(s): Kinnear and Peddie
- Architectural style: Scots Baronial

Listed Building – Category B
- Designated: 20 July 1971
- Reference no.: LB11014

Glengorm Castle, also known as Castle Sorne, is a 19th-century country house on the Isle of Mull, Scotland. Located in Mishnish, 6 kilometres (4 mi) northwest of Tobermory at the end of a dead end road, the house is protected as a Category B listed building.

The Mishnish estate was purchased in 1856 by James Forsyth of Quinish. He cleared the existing townships to make way for the new house, which was completed in 1860.

The house was designed by Kinnear and Peddie in a Scots Baronial style. Formerly being run as a guest house and wedding venue, now a family home, there is a café and shop in the former stables. The castle overlooks the Atlantic Ocean and on most days Coll and mainland Great Britain are clearly visible from the northern side of the castle, as well as Rùm, Canna and even Barra and Uist on clear days.

== Etymology and folklore ==
The name "Glengorm" is said to originate during the construction of the castle when apparently, Forsyth asked an elderly woman what he should name the manor. The story claims she suggested "Gleann Gorm", meaning blue glen. Forsyth used this name, unaware of the meaning, with the blue in the name referencing the unusual blue smoke visible from the castle, produced when the houses with seaweed and peat inside were burned when the surrounding settlements were cleared.

Another legend told about the construction of the castle is that an old woman cursed Forsyth to never live in the castle. In 1863, shortly before the final completion of the castle, Forsyth died in a riding accident, never getting to see it finished.
