= 1 Street SW station =

Light rail station in Calgary, Alberta, Canada

1 Street SW
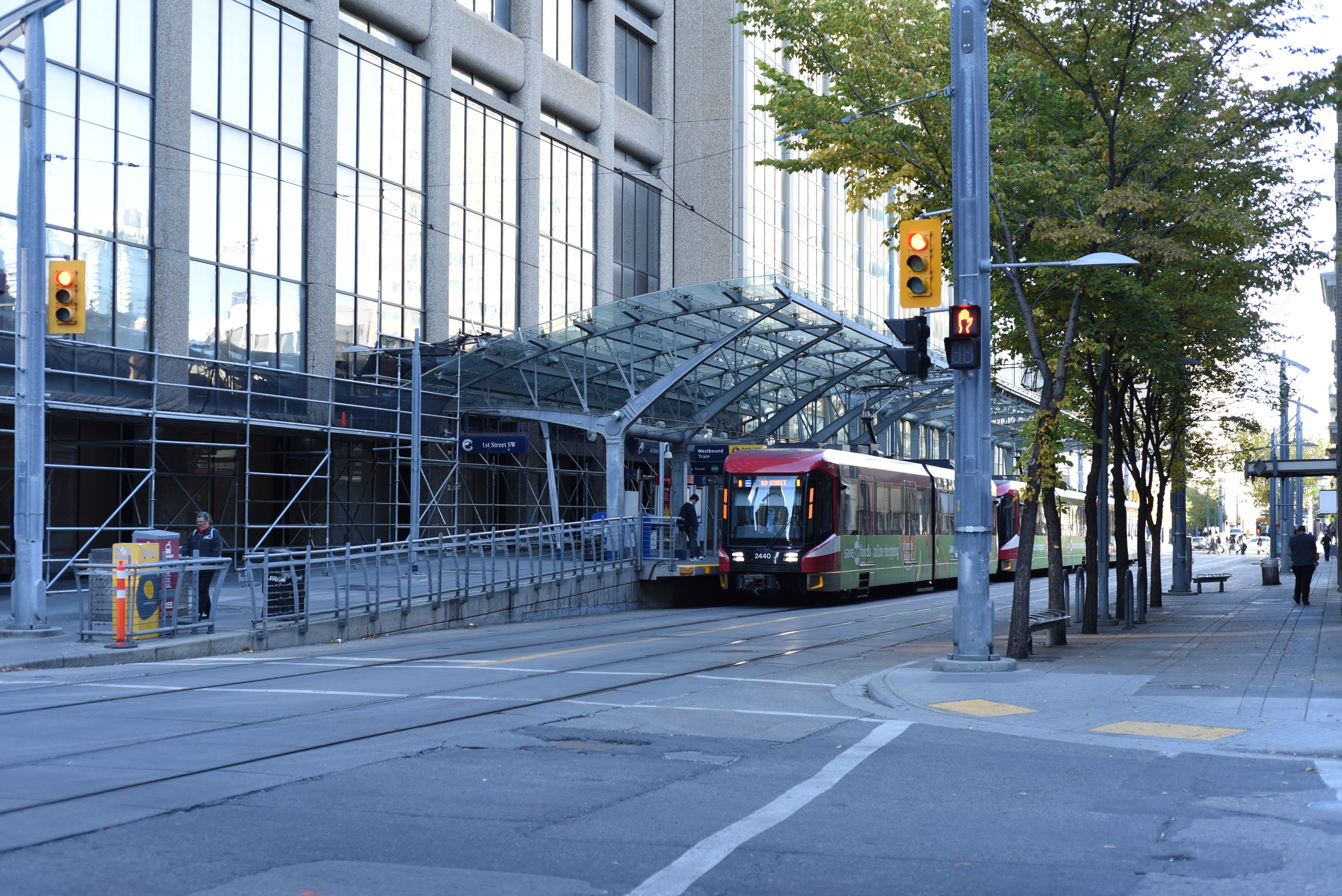

General information
- Location: 121C - 7 Avenue SE
- Coordinates: 51°02′47.6″N 114°03′51″W
- Owner: Calgary Transit
- Platforms: Single side-loading platform
- Connections: 1 Bowness; 6 Killarney-26 Ave; 10 Macleod Trail; 13 Altadore; 15 Deerfoot Meadows; 22 Richmond Road; 24 Ogden; 66 Lakeview; 90 Bridgeland/University of Calgary; 101 Inglewood; Max Purple East Hills/Chestermere

Construction
- Structure type: At-grade
- Accessible: yes

History
- Opened: 1981; 45 years ago
- Rebuilt: 2010; 16 years ago

Services
Preceding station	Calgary Transit	Following station
4 Street SW toward Tuscany	Red Line	City Hall/Bow Valley College One-way operation
4 Street SW toward 69 Street	Blue Line	City Hall/Bow Valley College One-way operation

Future services (at 7 Avenue SW)
Preceding station	Calgary Transit	Following station
Terminus	Green Line	Beltline toward Shepard

Former services
Preceding station	Calgary Transit	Following station
4 Street SW toward Tuscany	Red Line	Olympic Plaza One-way operation
4 Street SW toward 69 Street	Blue Line	Olympic Plaza One-way operation
Location

1 Street SW Station is a stop in Downtown Calgary on the city's CTrain light rail system. The 1 Street platform is served by westbound trains only, with the nearest eastbound train platforms being Centre Street station and 3 Street SW station, both of which only serve eastbound trains. The platform is located on the north side of 7 Avenue South, west of Centre Street within the free fare zone, serving both routes 201 and 202.

== History ==
The original 1 Street W station opened on May 25, 1981, as part of Calgary's first LRT line from 8 Street W to Anderson and was located between 1 Street and 2 Street SW (across from the Scotia Center). On October 28, 2005, a new four-car platform for the 1 Street Southwest stop was finished. The platform moved to a new location between 1 Street and Centre Street, one block east of its old location. This was the first station to be refurbished as part of the 7 Avenue Refurbishment Project.

All of the 7 Avenue Refurbished Stations that followed in 2005 - 2012 use the same basic design as Centre Street where the entire sidewalk slopes up to platform level. The canopy design at Centre Street is slightly different from the newer stations constructed in 2005 and onwards.

The Telus Convention Centre, Glenbow Museum, and the Calgary Tower are located near these platforms, as are skyscrapers such as the Suncor Energy Centre, Scotia Centre and Bow Valley Square.

On March 22, 2023, as part of an attempt to deal with crime along the C-Train system, 1st Street SW Station, along with every other station between City Hall and Downtown West-Kerby Stations would have the lighting and cameras upgraded.

== Ridership ==
According to data released by Calgary Transit, the 1 Street SW Station had an average weekday daily ridership of 19,000 in the year of 2007.

== Around the station ==
=== Major destinations ===
- Arts Commons
- Brookfield Place (skyscraper)
- Calgary Telus Convention Centre
- Calgary Tower
- Central United Church
- Glenbow Museum
- Olympic Plaza
- Scotia Centre
- Suncor Energy Centre (skyscraper)
- Telus Sky (skyscraper)
- The Bow (skyscraper)
- The CORE (shopping centre)

=== Communities ===
- Chinatown
- Downtown Commercial Core
- Downtown East Village

=== Major streets ===
- 1 Street SE
- 1 Street SW
- 7 Avenue S
- 9 Avenue S
- Centre Street
- Stephen Avenue (8 Avenue SW)

== Transit connections ==
Bus connections to the station as of 31 August, 2026:

- 1 - Forest Lawn
- 4 - Huntington
- 6 - Westhills
- 10 - Macleod Trail Southcentre
- 15 - Southland
- 22 - Richmond Road
- 24 - Ogden
- 66 - Lakeview
- 90 - Bridgeland / 90 - University of Calgary
- 101 - Inglewood
- - Max Purple (East Hills) / - Max Purple (Chestermere)
