= City Hall/Bow Valley College station =

Light rail station in Calgary, Alberta, Canada

City Hall/Bow Valley College
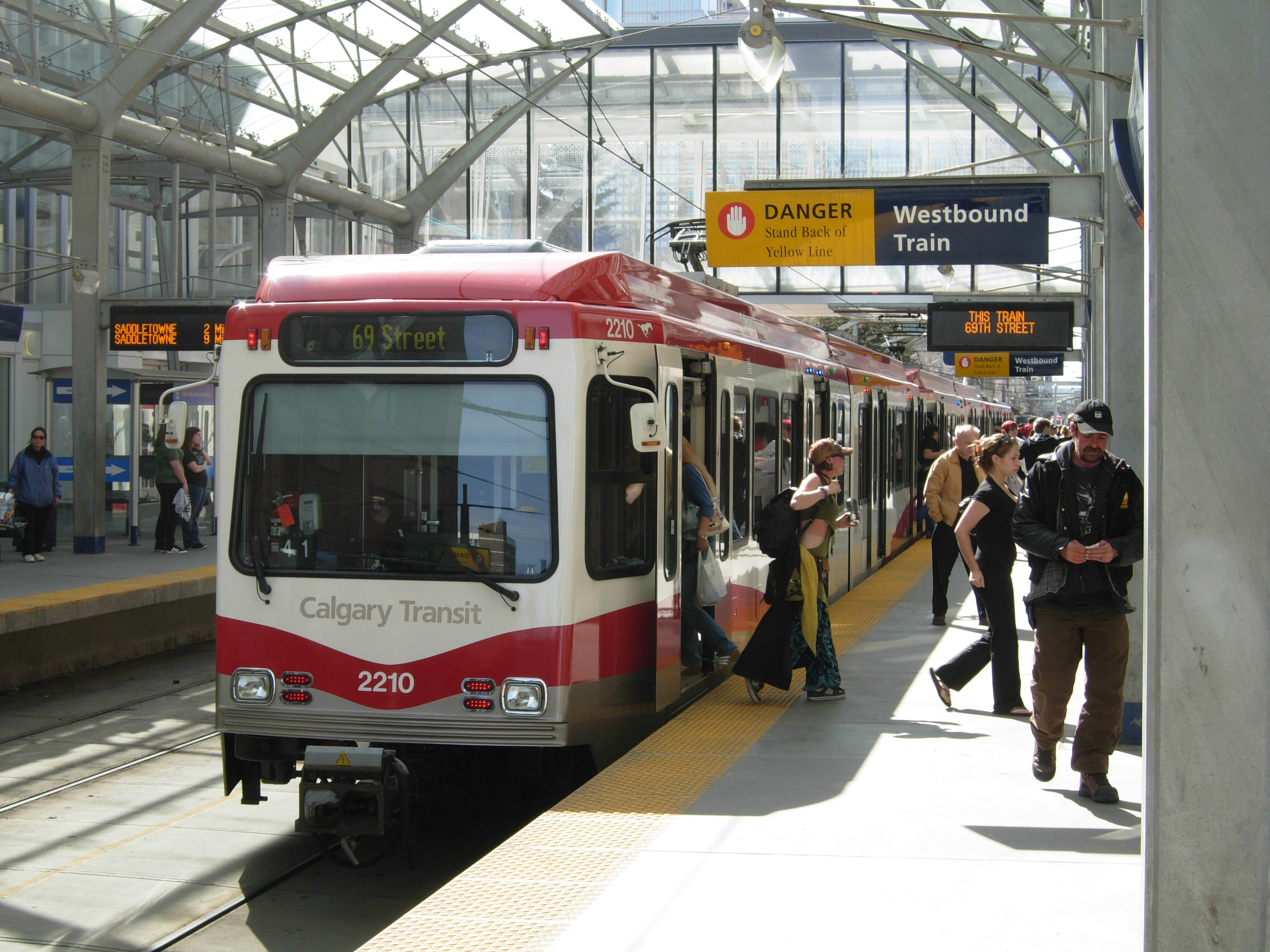
- City Hall Station after it was rebuilt in 2011

General information
- Other names: City Hall
- Location: 323C - 7 Avenue SE
- Coordinates: 51°02′46.5″N 114°03′25″W
- Owner: Calgary Transit
- Lines: Red Line; Blue Line
- Platforms: Side-loading platforms
- Connections: 1 Bowness; 4 Huntington; 5 North Haven; 10 Macleod Trail; 90 University of Calgary; 117 Mckenzie Towne Express; 131 East Bow Express; 151 New Brighton Express; 302 BRT Southeast; Max Purple City Centre; 500 Airport Express

Construction
- Structure type: At-grade
- Accessible: yes

History
- Opened: 1981; 45 years ago
- Rebuilt: 2011; 15 years ago (major)
- Former names: 2 Street SE (1981–1987); City Hall (1987–2023)

Services
Preceding station	Calgary Transit	Following station
1 Street SW toward Tuscany	Red Line	Victoria Park/Stampede toward Somerset–Bridlewood
Centre Street One-way operation	Red Line	Victoria Park/Stampede toward Somerset–Bridlewood
Centre Street One-way operation	Blue Line	Bridgeland/Memorial toward Saddletowne
1 Street SW toward 69 Street	Blue Line	Bridgeland/Memorial toward Saddletowne

Former services (City Hall)
Preceding station	Calgary Transit	Following station
Centre Street One-way operation	Red Line	3 Street SE toward Somerset–Bridlewood
Centre Street One-way operation	Blue Line	3 Street SE toward Saddletowne

Former services (Olympic Plaza)
Preceding station	Calgary Transit	Following station
1 Street SW One-way operation	Red Line	3 Street SE toward Somerset–Bridlewood
1 Street SW One-way operation	Blue Line	3 Street SE toward Saddletowne
Location

City Hall/Bow Valley College Station is a Calgary C-Train light rail station in Calgary, Alberta. It is the easternmost station of the 7 Avenue transit mall, located between Macleod Trail and 3 Street S.E. It was the first downtown station to have dual-side platforms (Downtown West–Kerby station, opened in 2012, was the second). It serves both the Red Line and the Blue Line and is the eastern extent of the free-fare zone. The station is located inside of the Downtown Commercial Core on the southeastern area of the community, near the border of the Downtown East Village community.

This new dual-platform station replaces the previous City Hall and Olympic Plaza stations both of which opened May 25, 1981, as part of Calgary's first LRT line from 8 Street W to Anderson.

The original City Hall station served only eastbound trains. The station was initially named 2 Street SE, and was renamed City Hall in late 1987.

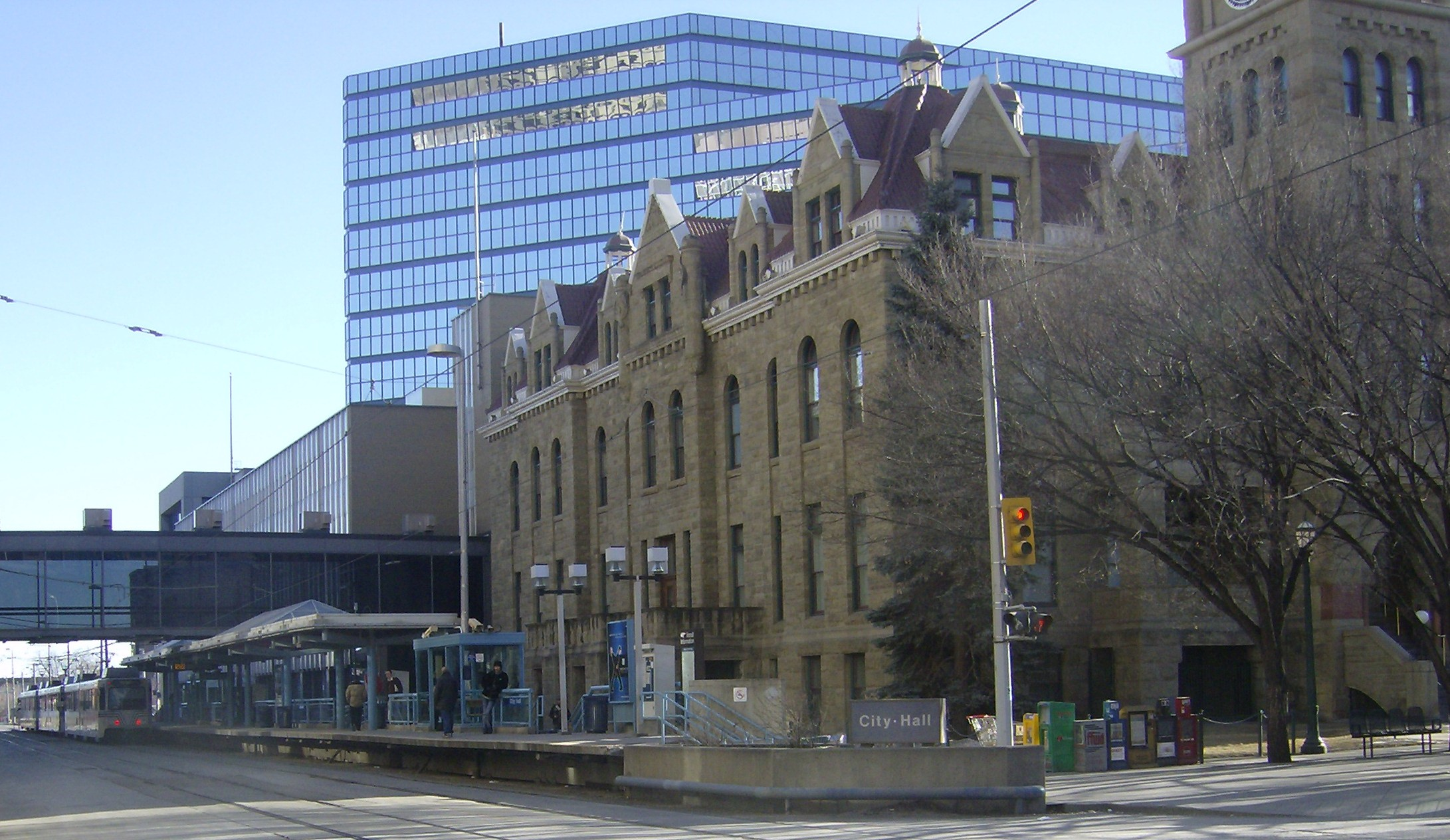
Previous City Hall platform. The sandstone building behind it is Calgary City Hall. The glass building behind that is the Calgary Municipal Building.

The original Olympic Plaza Station served only westbound trains. The station was initially named 1 Street SE, and was renamed Olympic Plaza in late 1987 in preparation for the opening of its namesake park adjacent to the station in 1988. The station was located between Macleod Trail and 1 Street SE.

On May 3, 2010, the original City Hall station was closed to be demolished and rebuilt on the spot, with a new westbound platform being constructed across the street, while the original Olympic Plaza station remained open. On June 6, 2011, both City Hall platforms opened and Olympic Plaza was permanently closed and demolished shortly thereafter. After the 2011 Stampede finished, the eastbound platform on the south side of 7 Avenue, adjacent to the Municipal Building, was re-closed to finish construction and officially reopened on September 19, 2011. The westbound platform on the north side of 7 Avenue, adjacent to the Calgary Central Library, was completely finished as of June 6, 2011, and remained open.

Olympic Plaza was the last of the original 1981-built stations on 7 Avenue to be demolished. Both of the new platforms are built to 4-car length and use the same design as all other downtown stations.

Notable locations near the station include the Calgary Municipal Building, Calgary City Hall, Arts Commons, Calgary Central Library, Bow Valley College and Olympic Plaza. The United States Consulate Office is located at nearby Rocky Mountain Plaza across from Olympic Plaza, beside where the now-demolished station of the same name used to stand.

In 2023, lighting and security cameras were upgraded at all stations along the 7 Avenue Transit Mall, including City Hall, as part of an attempt to deal with crime along the CTrain system.

On September 19 2023, Calgary Transit announced the station would be renamed to City Hall/Bow Valley College to simplify the commute for students and staff and better reflect the area.

With 2007 data released by Calgary Transit, the former Olympic Plaza station had a ridership of 11,800 on weekdays, the old City Hall station had a ridership of 9,700 on weekdays, and the former 3 Street SE station had a ridership of 3,400 on weekdays. With these combined, the modern City Hall station would have had an average weekday ridership of 24,900 in 2007.

== Around the station ==
=== Major destinations ===
- Arts Commons
- Bow Valley College
- Calgary City Hall
- Central Library
- Olympic Plaza
- The Bow (skyscraper)

=== Communities ===
- Downtown Commercial Core
- Downtown East Village

=== Major streets ===
- 3 Street SE
- 5 Street SE
- 7 Avenue S
- 9 Avenue S
- Macleod Trail
- Stephen Avenue (8 Avenue SW)

== Transit connections ==
Bus connections to the station as of 31 August, 2026:

- 1 - Bowness
- 4 - Huntington
- 5 - North Haven
- 10 - Macleod Trail City Hall
- 90 - University of Calgary
- 117 - Mckenzie Towne Express
- 131 - East Bow Express
- 151 - New Brighton Express
- 302 - BRT City Centre
- - Max Purple (City Centre)
- 500 - Airport Express

== See also ==
- CTrain
- Red Line (Calgary)
- Blue Line (Calgary)
- Calgary City Hall
- Bow Valley College
