= Calgary Central Library =

Public library in Calgary, Alberta, Canada

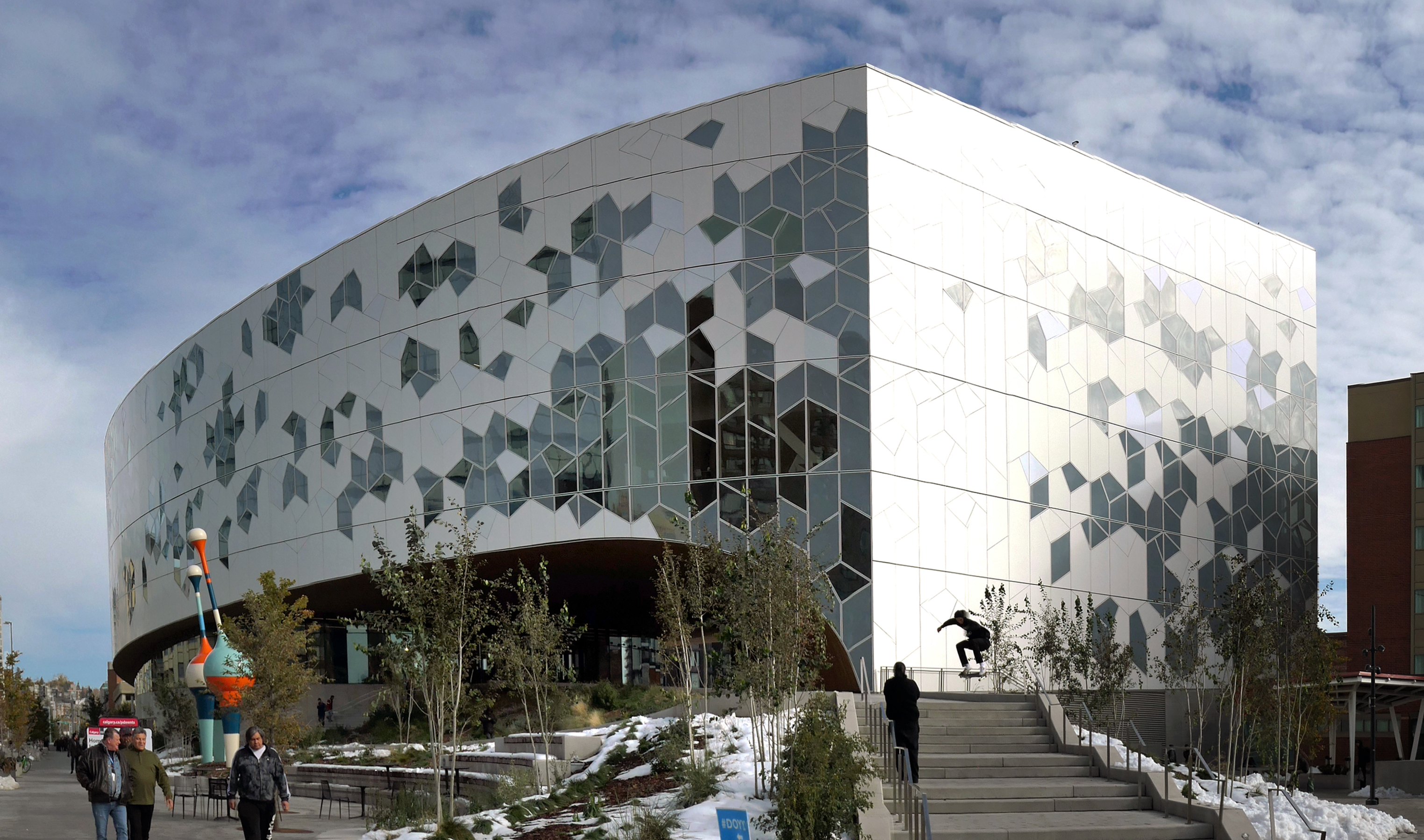
- Interactive map of the Calgary Central Library area
- Alternative names: New Central Library

General information
- Type: Public library
- Location: 800 3rd Street SE; Calgary, Alberta
- Coordinates: 51.0453°N 114.0549°W
- Construction started: 2013
- Completed: November 1, 2018
- Cost: $245 million (CAD)
- Owner: Calgary Public Library

Technical details
- Floor count: 4
- Floor area: 22,000 m^{2} (240,000 sq ft)

Design and construction
- Architecture firm: Snøhetta; DIALOG
- Developer: Calgary Municipal Land Corporation
- Structural engineer: Entuitive
- Services engineer: SMP Engineering
- Main contractor: Stuart Olson

Website
- https://calgarylibrary.ca/

The Calgary Central Library, also known as the Calgary New Central Library (NCL), is a public library in Calgary, Alberta, Canada, and the flagship branch of the Calgary Public Library system. The building is located in the Downtown East Village neighbourhood and opened on November 1, 2018, replacing an earlier central branch built in the 1960s in Downtown Calgary.

The four-storey building cost CA$245 million to construct and was designed by American-Norwegian architecture firm Snøhetta and Canadian firm DIALOG after the two firms' joint bid won a design competition in 2013. Their design features an oval-like form and an interior with a large central atrium with a skylight. The building is elevated one floor above street level to accommodate the Red line of the CTrain below, as well as a public plaza.

Planning for a new library began in 2004 and was finalized in 2011. Construction began in 2013 with the encapsulation of an existing CTrain light rail tunnel portal; above-ground construction of the library itself began in September 2015.

== Location ==
The Calgary Central Library is located along 3rd Street SE between 7th and 9th avenues in the Downtown East Village neighborhood. The library is directly east of the Calgary Municipal Building and the connected City Hall Station for the CTrain. The Central Library shares its block with the historic King Edward Hotel to the southeast, which is connected to the National Music Centre with a skybridge to the east.

== Planning and funding ==
Planning began in 2004 for a new central library branch in Downtown Calgary to replace the previous structure which had been in use since 1964. The City of Calgary, working with the Calgary Municipal Land Corporation, proposed a site adjacent to the Calgary Municipal Building in the Downtown East Village neighborhood. Calgary City Council approved the project in 2011, providing $40 million for its construction. Other sites in consideration, and subsequently rejected included the current Central Library site in Downtown, the former headquarters of the Calgary Board of Education, Olympic Plaza, and the former Telus World of Science centre in the Downtown West End.

Funding for the Calgary Central Library project was budgeted at $245 million, with $175 million contributed by the City of Calgary, $70 million from the Calgary Municipal Land Corporation, a city-owned real estate developer. The largest private donation for the project, via the Calgary Public Library Foundation, was a $1.5 million contribution from Nexen, a Calgary-based oil company and subsidiary to the Chinese state-run CNOOC, for the naming rights to a high-tech learning centre.

== Design and amenities ==
The Calgary Central Library's design was unveiled to the public in September 2014 by architects Snøhetta (known for Bibliotheca Alexandrina) and DIALOG, who won a design competition in 2013. The entire building is oval-shaped and is elevated one floor above street level to cover a CTrain light rail tunnel and an open plaza, included with the intention of connecting Calgary's East Village to Downtown. The entrance is framed by wood-clad arches inspired by the shape of arched clouds made by Chinook winds in Alberta. Landscaping around the library and adjoining plaza consists of terracing inspired by the foothills of the Canadian Rockies.

The exterior of the Calgary Central Library is wrapped in a textured façade, with translucent fritted glass panels used to shield private study areas and clear glass to make public areas viewable from the outside.

The 22,000-square-metre (240,000 sq ft) interior is centered around a four-storey central atrium topped by a skylight. The lower floors contain the library's meeting spaces and activity centres, while the upper floors feature book stacks with space for 450,000 titles and a reading room. At street level, one floor below the main lobby, is a 340-seat theatre, conference rooms, and small café.

The library features several sustainable design features, such as triple-pane windows to save energy on climate control and finishings made of low volatile organic compound materials.

One notable absence from the new library is a connection to Calgary's +15 skybridge system that spans the central business district of Calgary, with the nearest connected structure at the Calgary Municipal Building. A connection was considered, but ultimately rejected because of conflicts with the city hall's hours of operation as well as low predicted traffic.

Calgary mayor Naheed Nenshi described the library as a "new icon for the city" at the public unveiling of the final design in 2014.

Public art for the library was selected in 2017, with one percent of the project budget dedicated to public art.

== Construction and opening ==
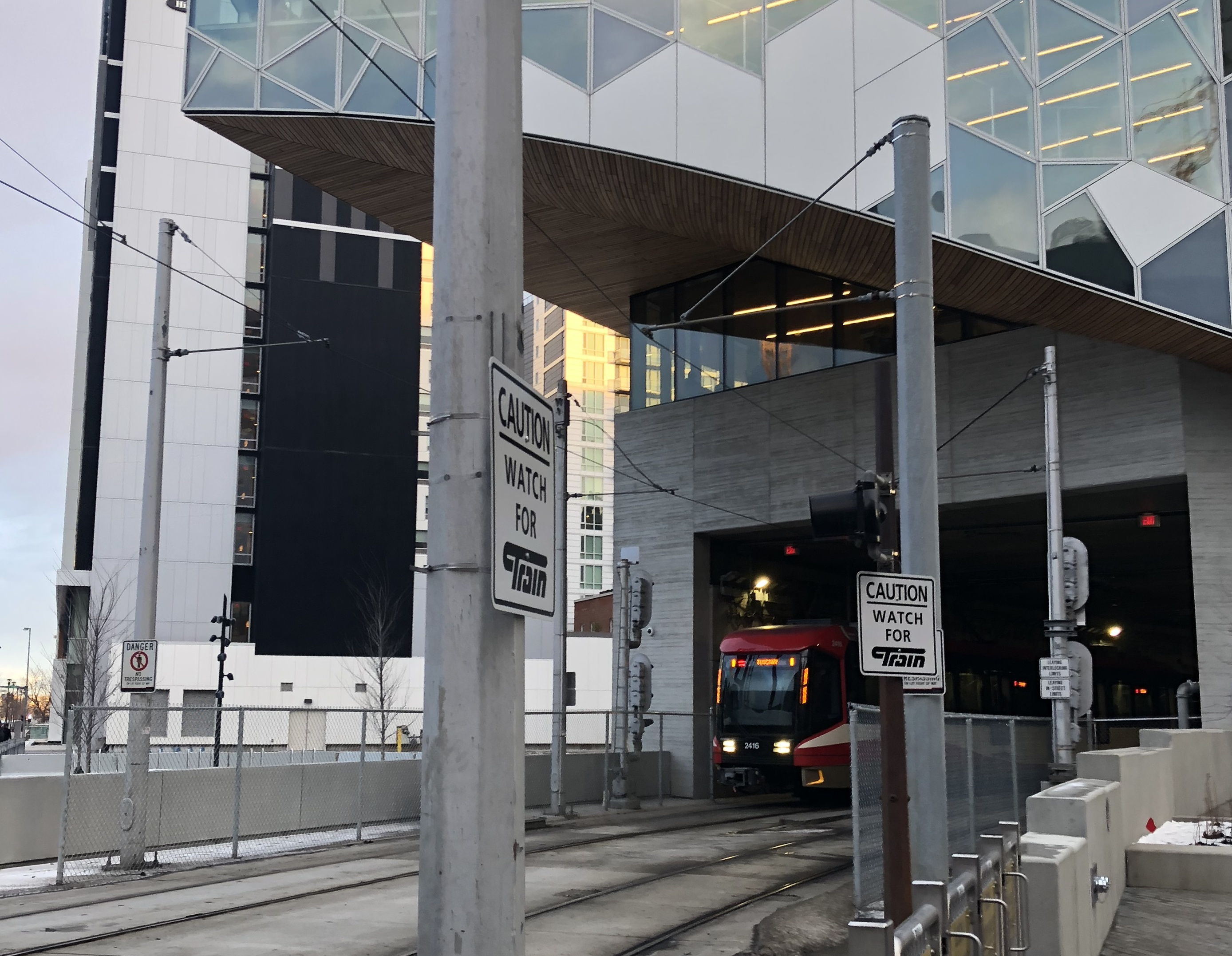
The library incorporates a CTrain light rail tunnel

The first stage of construction was the $25 million encapsulation of a 135-metre (443 ft) section of light rail used by Calgary Transit's Red Line, which emerges from a tunnel under the site. The light rail encapsulation began in May 2014 and was completed in September 2015, allowing for construction of the above ground portion of the Central Library to begin.

The Calgary Central Library was opened to the public on November 1, 2018, with Canadian astronaut Chris Hadfield dedicating the building. Following the opening ceremonies, special public events continued for four days, with a total of 52,000 people visited the new Central Library. The library was praised for its design and its potential impact on Calgary's image amid a planned bid for the 2026 Winter Olympics.

== Reception ==
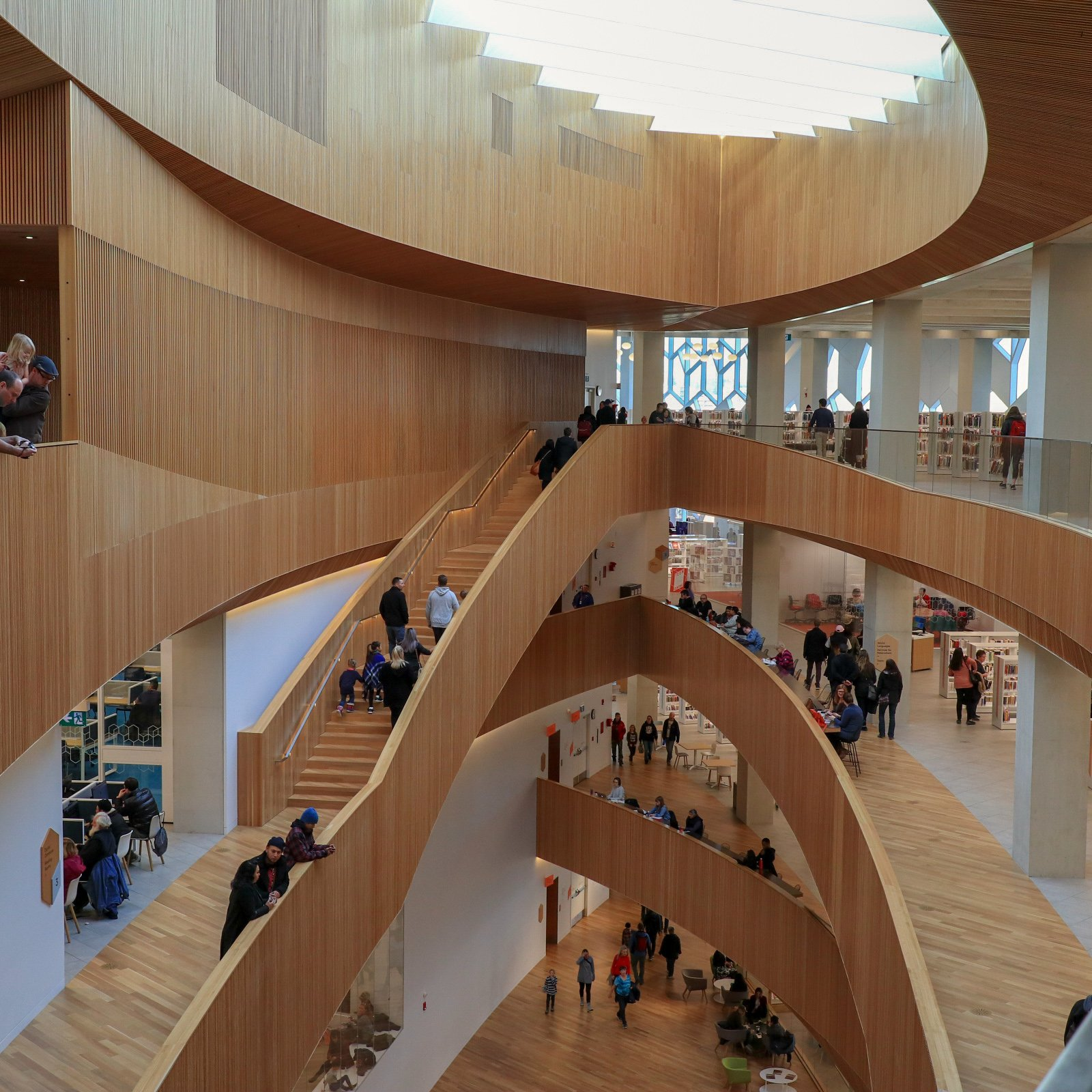
Interior of the Calgary Central Library

Prior to the Central Library's completion, the design was listed as one of Architectural Digest's twelve most anticipated buildings of 2018. The design won a 2020 Architecture Award from the American Institute of Architects, a 2020 American Institute of Architects New York Design Award for outstanding architectural design by American Institute of Architects New York members, and American Institute of Architects, American Library Association and Library Leadership and Management Association 2019 AIA/ALA Library Building Award.

The Society for Experiential Graphic Designs awarded the Central Library with the Global Design Merit Award 2019 for Pathfinding, noting the simple, friendly approach to colours and shapes which provides information to patrons. The Central Library would also win the Canadian Consulting Engineers Award of Excellence and CISC Alberta Steel Design Award for Building Communities, the Association of Consulting Engineering Companies 2019 CCE Award of Excellence, Canadian Architect Award of Merit, and Azure Magazine's Best Canadian Architecture of the Decade.
