= Olympic Plaza =

Olympic Plaza may refer to one of the following:

- Olympic Plaza (Calgary) – A downtown city park and gathering place in Calgary, Alberta, Canada
- Pyeongchang Olympic Plaza – Public square situated on the site of the former Olympic Stadium in Daegwallyeong-myeon, Pyeongchang, South Korea
- Sochi Medals Plaza – Centre-piece of Sochi Olympic Park on the Black Sea coast of southern Russia
