= Centre Street station (Calgary) =

Light rail station in Calgary, Alberta, Canada

Centre Street
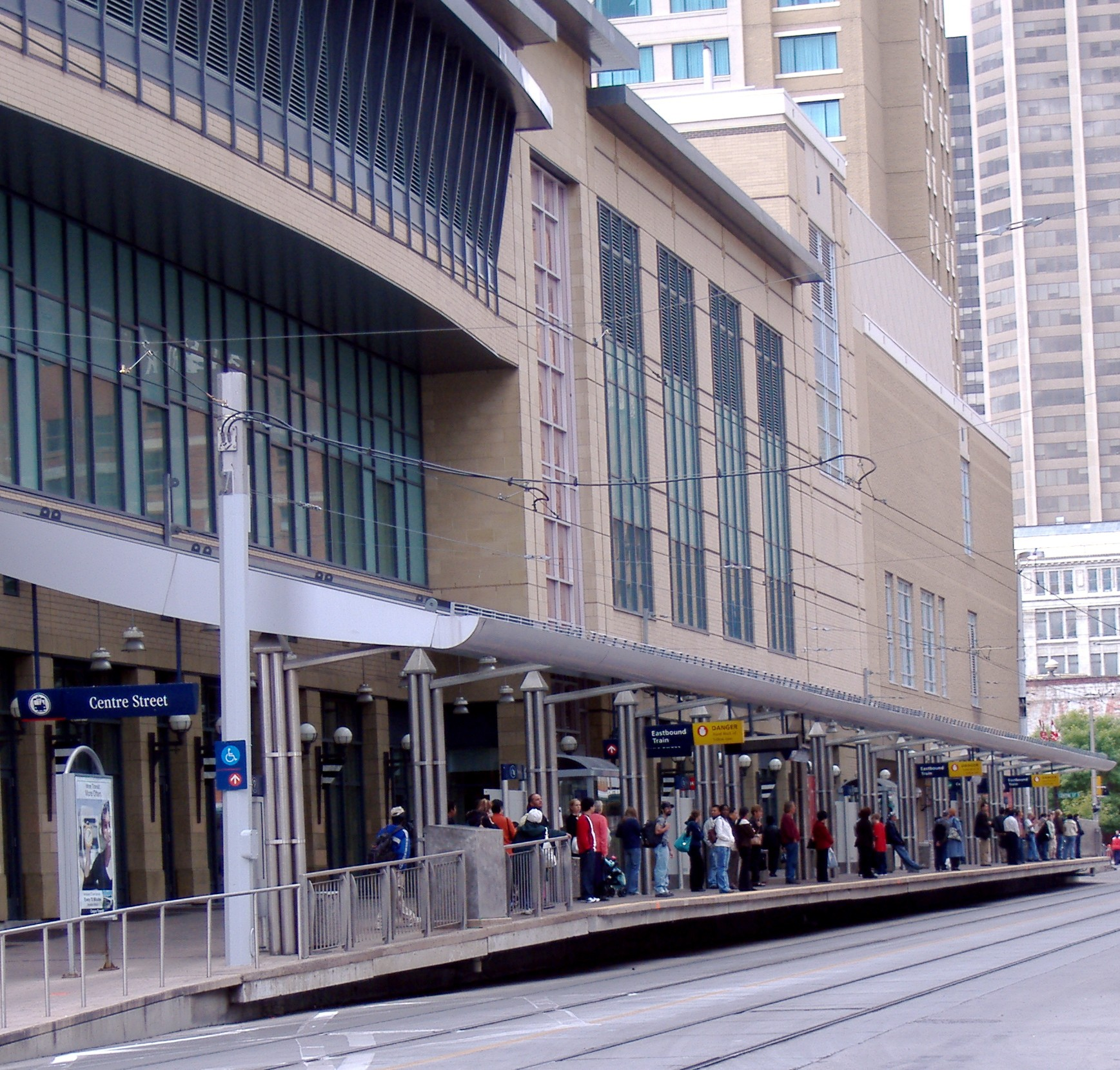

General information
- Location: 124 7 Avenue SE
- Coordinates: 51°02′47″N 114°03′40″W
- Owner: Calgary Transit
- Platforms: Single side-loading platform
- Connections: 4 Huntington; 5 North Haven; 24 Ogden; 117 Mckenzie Towne Express; 131 East Bow Express; 151 New Brighton Express

Construction
- Structure type: At-grade
- Accessible: yes

History
- Opened: 1981
- Rebuilt: 2000

Services
| Preceding station | Calgary Transit | Following station |
|---|---|---|
| 3 Street SW One-way operation | Red Line | City Hall/Bow Valley College toward Somerset–Bridlewood |
| 3 Street SW One-way operation | Blue Line | City Hall/Bow Valley College toward Saddletowne |

Former services
| Preceding station | Calgary Transit | Following station |
|---|---|---|
| 3 Street SW One-way operation | Red Line | City Hall One-way operation |
| 3 Street SW One-way operation | Blue Line | City Hall One-way operation |
Location

Centre Street station is a stop in downtown Calgary on the city's CTrain light rail system. It is only used by eastbound trains, with the nearest stations serving westbound trains being 1 Street Southwest station (serving only eastbound trains) and City Hall/Bow Valley College, serving both directions. The platform is located on the south side of 7 Avenue South, east of Centre Street, and is located inside the free fare zone serving both routes 201 and 202.

The original Centre Street station opened on May 25, 1981, as part of Calgary's first LRT line from 8 Street W to Anderson and was located between 1 Street SW & Centre Street. The station was relocated one block east between Centre Street & 1 Street SE to coincide with the Telus Convention Center Redevelopment and opened on May 30, 2000. This was not part of the 7 Avenue Refurbishment and the station was constructed to three-car length with room to easily expand to four-car length when needed in the future. Construction of the platform extension at Centre Street station was completed in early 2012.

All of the 7 Avenue Refurbished Stations that followed in 2005–2012 use the same basic design as Centre Street where the entire sidewalk slopes up to platform level. However, the canopy design at Centre Street is slightly different from the newer stations constructed in 2005 and onwards.

The station is connected to the Telus Convention Centre with a direct entrance on the station platform.

In 2005 the station registered an average of 11,200 weekday boardings.

== Around the station ==
=== Major destinations ===
- Arts Commons
- Brookfield Place (skyscraper)
- Calgary Telus Convention Centre
- Calgary Tower
- Central United Church
- Glenbow Museum
- Olympic Plaza
- Suncor Energy Centre (skyscraper)
- Telus Sky (skyscraper)
- The Bow (skyscraper)

=== Communities ===
- Chinatown
- Downtown Commercial Core
- Downtown East Village

=== Major streets ===
- 1 Street SE
- 1 Street SW
- 7 Avenue S
- 9 Avenue S
- Centre Street
- Stephen Avenue (8 Avenue SW)

== Transit connections ==
Bus connections to the station as of 31 August, 2026:

- 4 - Huntington
- 5 - North Haven
- 24 - Ogden
- 117 - Mckenzie Towne Express
- 131 - East Bow Express
- 151 - New Brighton Express
