= 3 Street SE station =

Light rail station in Calgary, Alberta, Canada

3 Street SE
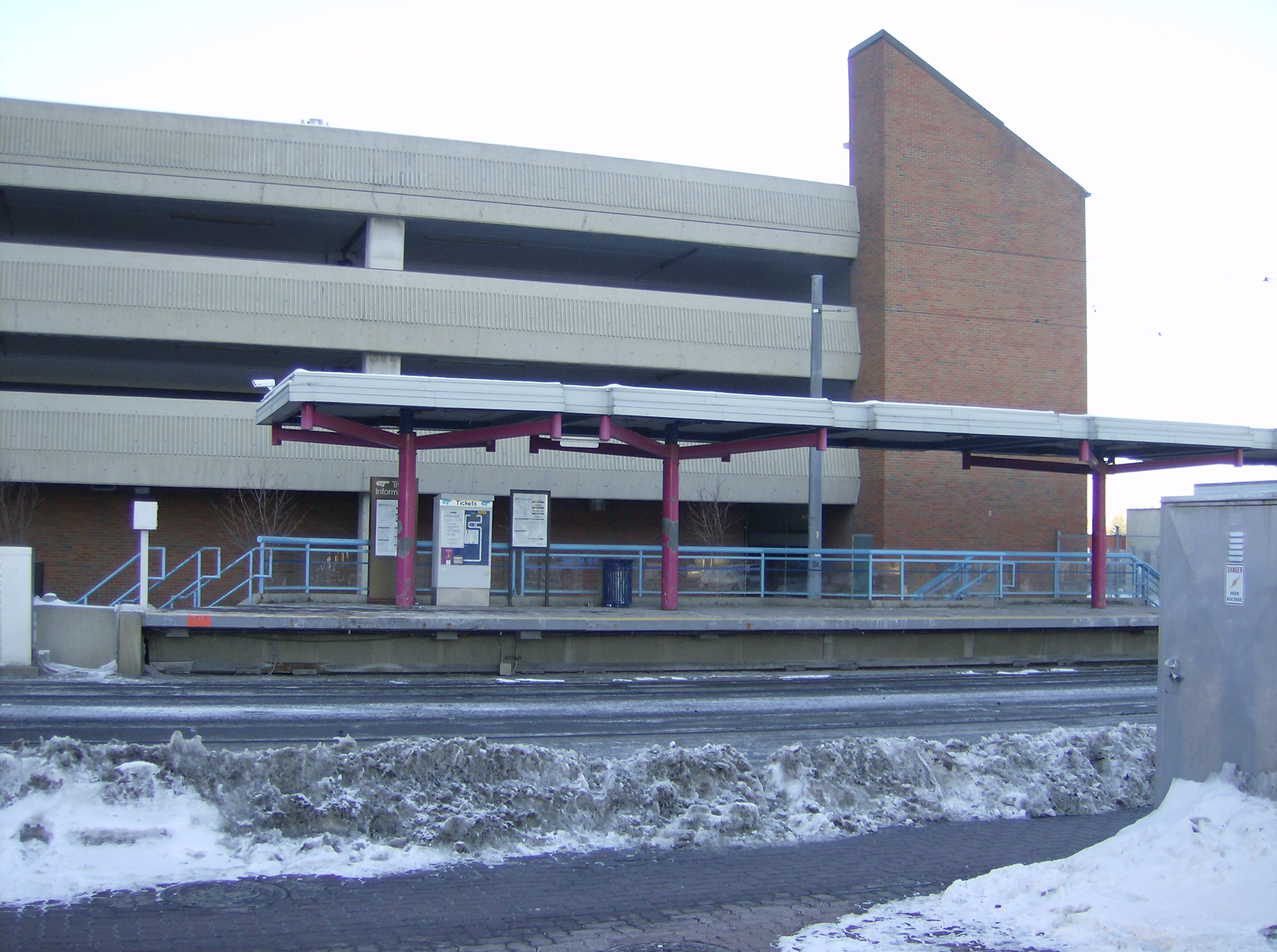

General information
- Location: 420C - 7 Avenue SE
- Coordinates: 51°02′46.5″N 114°03′17.0″W
- System: Former CTrain station (7th Avenue Transit Corridor)
- Owner: Calgary Transit
- Platforms: Single side-loading platform

History
- Opened: 1985
- Closed: 2010

Former Services
Preceding station	Calgary Transit	Following station
Centre Street One-way operation	Blue Line	Bridgeland/Memorial toward Saddletowne
Olympic Plaza toward 69 Street	Blue Line	Bridgeland/Memorial toward Saddletowne
Location

3 Street SE station was a stop in downtown Calgary on the city's CTrain light rail system.

The 3 Street SE stop was only used by westbound Route 202 trains (but still at the junction where the Northeast and South lines converge into the 7 Avenue Transit Mall). The Platform for the station was located on the north side of 7 Avenue S between 4 Street SE and 3 Street SE. The station opened on April 27, 1985, along with the Northeast Line and was permanently closed on May 3, 2010, and demolished immediately afterward.

The 3 Street SE platform was one of three downtown platforms slated for decommissioning as part of Calgary Transit's Seventh Avenue refurbishment. This station has been replaced with the new dual-platform City Hall station located one block west which opened on July 6, 2011. From the station's closure on May 3, 2010, and until July 6, 2011, transit passengers had to use the Olympic Plaza station two blocks west.

In 2005, the station registered an average of 3,400 boardings per weekday, by far the lowest of all the stations in the downtown.
