= Zoo station (Calgary) =

Light rail station in Calgary, Alberta, Canada

Calgary Zoo
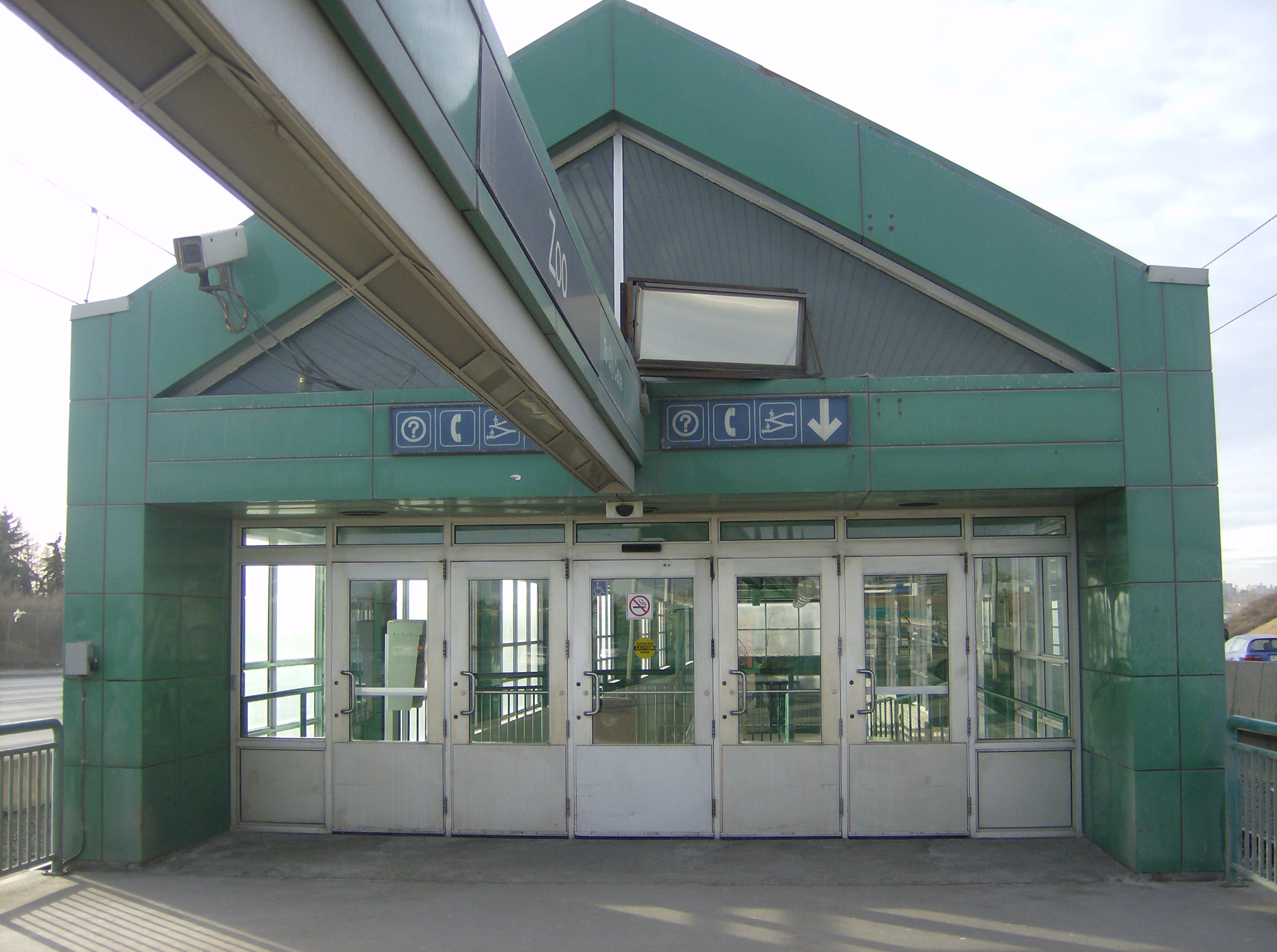

General information
- Other names: Zoo
- Location: 1400 Memorial Drive NE
- Coordinates: 51°02′51″N 114°01′30″W
- Owner: Calgary Transit
- Platforms: Center-loading platform
- Connections: No connections to bus routes

Construction
- Structure type: At-grade
- Parking: 500 spaces (paid only)
- Accessible: yes

History
- Opened: 1985; 41 years ago
- Rebuilt: 2014; 12 years ago (platform extensions); 2019; 7 years ago (interior renovations)

Services
Preceding station	Calgary Transit	Following station
Bridgeland/Memorial toward 69 Street	Blue Line	Barlow/Max Bell toward Saddletowne
Location

Calgary Zoo station is a CTrain light rail station in Calgary, Alberta, Canada. It is on the Blue Line between Bridgeland/Memorial and Barlow/Max Bell stations. It opened on April 22, 1985 as part of the original Blue Line. The station serves the Wilder Institute/Calgary Zoo, the Telus Spark science museum as well as the community of Bridgeland.

== Location and station layout ==
The station has a single island platform. The station is located between the two lanes of Memorial Drive, with a tunnel connecting the station north to its park and ride and another tunnel connecting the station south to the Wilder Institute/Calgary Zoo.

=== Art ===
Stylistically, the design of Calgary Zoo station differs from the other stations in the CTrain system as it incorporates images of animals and dinosaurs. The station's Island platform is accessed via ramps leading up from a tunnel below Memorial Drive. The tunnel below Memorial Drive also houses several permanent zoo-related exhibits.

== Station upgrades ==
As part of Calgary Transit's plan to operate 4-car trains by the end of 2014, all 3-car platforms are being extended. Calgary Zoo station will also see new furnishings in addition to a platform extension. Construction started in early 2014 and lasted approximately 6 months.

Calgary Transit, in collaboration with Shaw Communications, announced on November 16, 2016 that 8 new locations for Public Wi-Fi services would be added to the Calgary C-Train system. These new locations would add public Wi-Fi to 18 new stations; including Zoo Station. These changes ere done as they would improve transit experience for their users, which would improve customer commitment.

Renovations to the station began in September 2017 and were completed in March 2019, with the station remaining open with no disruption to service. The renovations included new wall, ceiling, and floor finishes, enhanced security, including new CCTV cameras, lighting, mechanical, and electrical upgrades, a new public announcement system, new station signs, upgraded station doors, backup power capabilities, and a new roofing system.
