= Bridgeland/Memorial station =

Light rail station in Calgary, Alberta, Canada

Bridgeland/Memorial
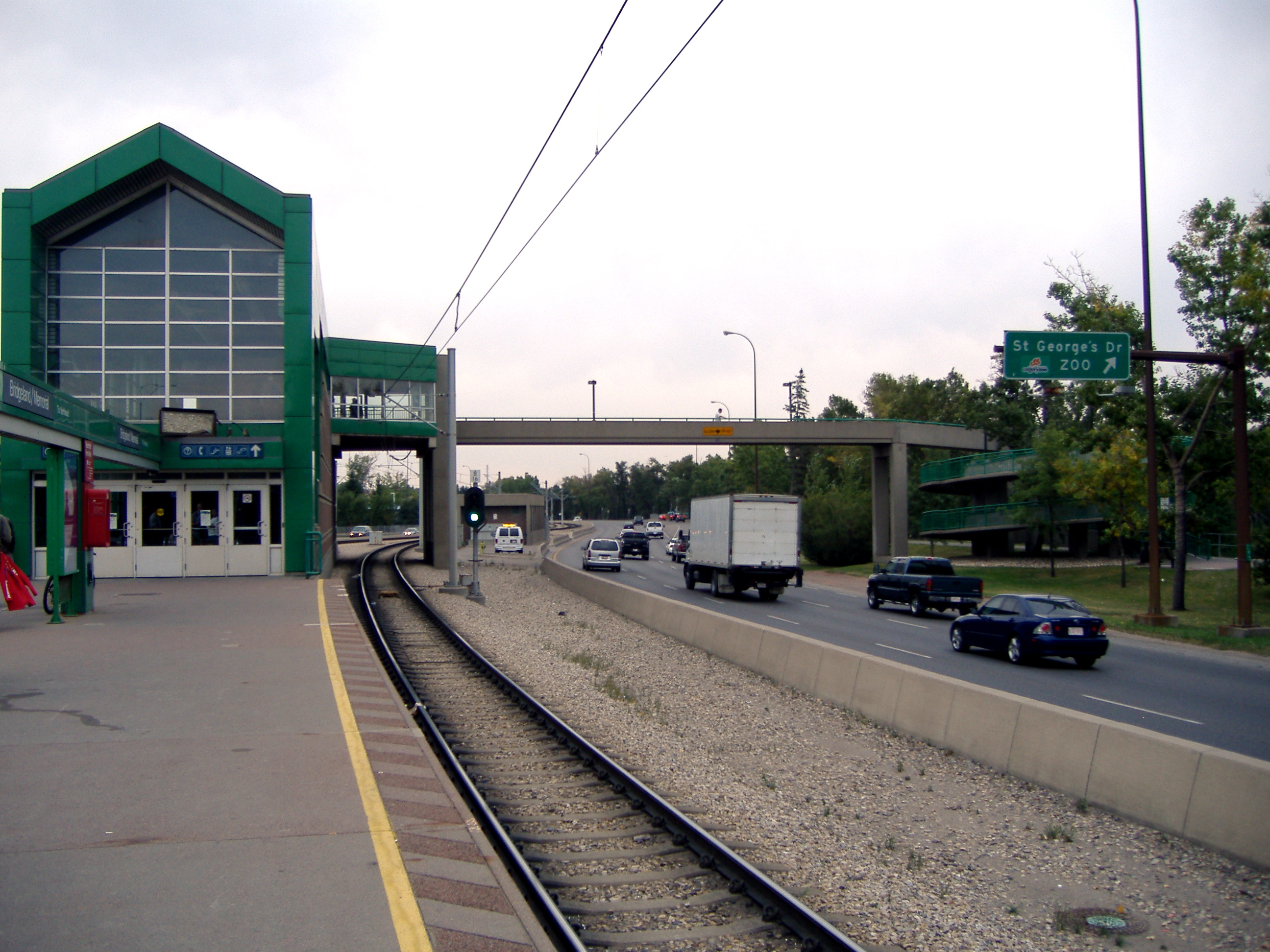

General information
- Location: 1010 Memorial Drive NE
- Coordinates: 51°02′56.7″N 114°02′26″W
- Owner: Calgary Transit
- Platforms: Center-loading platform
- Connections: 90 University of Calgary

Construction
- Structure type: At-grade
- Accessible: yes

History
- Opened: 1985; 41 years ago
- Rebuilt: 2014; 12 years ago

Services
Preceding station	Calgary Transit	Following station
City Hall/Bow Valley College toward 69 Street	Blue Line	Zoo toward Saddletowne

Former services
Preceding station	Calgary Transit	Following station
3 Street SE toward 69 Street	Blue Line	Zoo toward Saddletowne
Location

Bridgeland/Memorial station is a CTrain light rail station in Calgary, Alberta. It serves the Northeast Line (Route 202). It opened on April 27, 1985, as part of the original Northeast line. The station is located in the median of Memorial Drive Northeast, 1.4 km from the City Hall Interlocking. A pedestrian overpass connects the station to both sides of Memorial Drive and stairs and escalators, as well as an elevator provide access down to the center-loading platform.

In 2004 and 2005, the station underwent upgrading and renovations to improve safety and access for visually impaired users wishing to access the nearby CNIB facility, and also in preparation for increased usage as work on The Bridges - a major inner city redevelopment project on the north side of the station - progressed. The station was closed for a couple of weeks in the summer of 2004 due to the construction.

As part of Calgary Transit's plan to operate 4-car trains by the end of 2014, all 3-car platforms were extended. Construction on the extension of the platform at Bridgeland/Memorial started and was finished in 2014.

In 2005, the station registered an average transit of 1,300 boardings per weekday.

== Media coverage ==
In 1993, a re-enactment of an incident involving a 4-year-old child becoming entrapped by an escalator was filmed in the station for the TV show "Rescue 911". Although the incident actually occurred at Rundle LRT station, this station was chosen for having an identical layout and more aesthetically pleasing visuals.

== Station upgrades ==
Calgary Transit, in collaboration with Shaw Communications, announced on November 16, 2016, that 8 new locations for Public Wi-Fi services would be added to the Calgary C-Train system. These new locations would add public Wi-Fi to 18 new stations; including Bridgeland/Memorial Station. These changes were done as they would improve transit experience for their users, which would improve customer commitment.

== Transit connections ==
Bus connections to the station as of 31 August, 2026:

- 90 - University of Calgary

== Crime ==
Two groups of people started fighting on a Northbound C-Train at Bridgeland/Memorial station. Three people were stabbed in the brawl, with the victims rushing to get out at Bridgeland-Memorial station at roughly 11 PM.

Police say at around 9:30 PM on November 10, 2014, a passerby heard the victim moaning and found her in bushes near the Bridgeland-Memorial LRT Station. The victim had been found suffering with blunt force trauma to her head, and confirmed that she was a victim of a sexual assault.

At roughly 6:30 AM on May 18, 2022, at Bridgeland-Memorial Station, a person was stabbed and rushed to Foothills Medical Centre in stable condition.
