= Calgary Public Library =

Public library system in Calgary, Canada

- Location: Calgary, Alberta, Canada
- Established: 1912
- Branches: 22

Collection
- Size: 2,332,581 (2012)

Access and use
- Circulation: 17,121,718

Other information
- Director: Sarah Meilleur
- Website: calgarylibrary.ca

The Calgary Public Library (CPL) is a distributed library system featuring 22 branch locations including the Central Library. As of 2012, it is the second most used system in Canada (after the Toronto Public Library) and the sixth most used library system in North America. This is despite the fact that the Calgary Public Library has one of the lowest per capita funding in the country, receiving as little as half the money of other Canadian public libraries.

== History ==
The Calgary Public Library Board of Trustees was established on May 18, 1908. R. B. Bennett, who would later serve as Prime Minister of Canada, was among the five people appointed to the board. The first public library opened on January 2, 1912, thanks in part to the generosity of Scottish / American industrialist and philanthropist Andrew Carnegie.

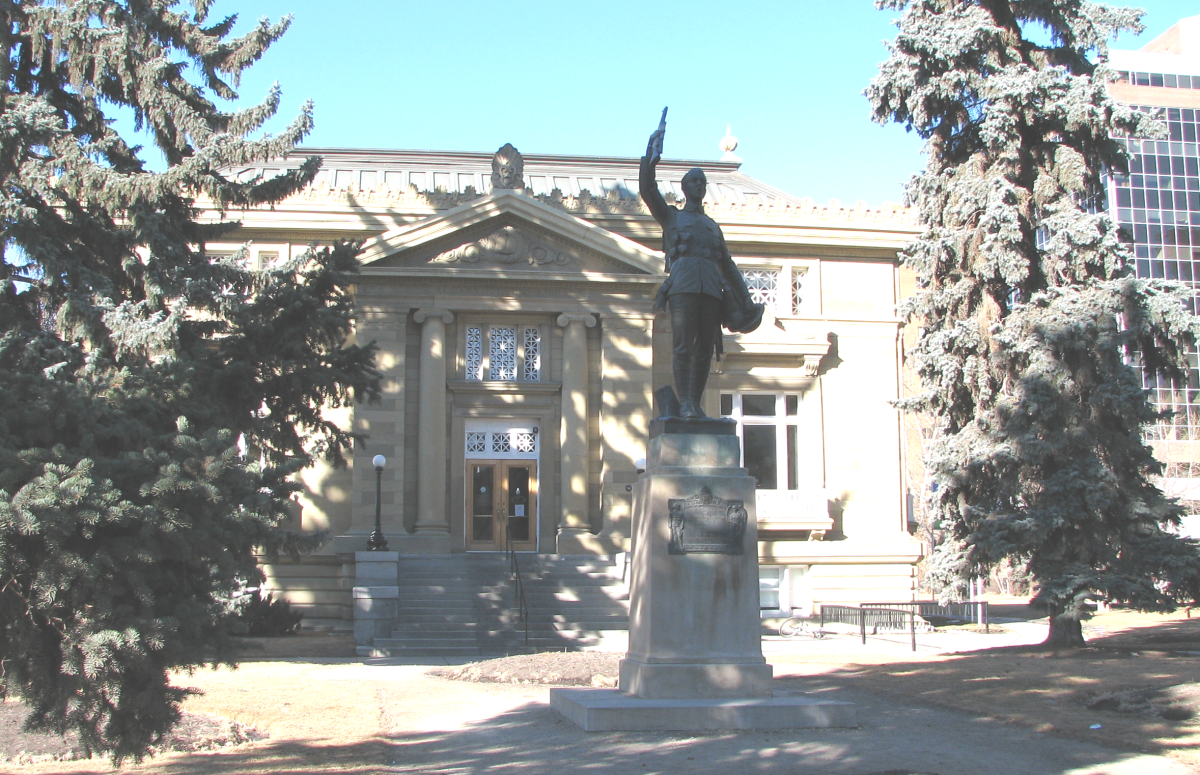
Memorial Park branch, 2008. The First World War memorial was erected in 1924 by the Imperial Order Daughters of the Empire.

Carnegie funded $80,000 of the $100,000 cost of Calgary's Central Library, (now renamed the Memorial Park Branch), pressuring City Hall to fund the rest.

The building was the first purpose-built public library in Alberta. It was designed by Boston architects McLean & Wright, and built out of local Paskapoo Sandstone (a soft stone that today presents a substantial preservation challenge). This library branch is a copy of a library in Attleboro, Massachusetts.

In 1929 the formal Victorian-style park surrounding the Central Library was dedicated to the honour of those who had died in the Great War. During construction of the original building, the Calgary Library Board sought out a librarian to oversee the opening of its new library. In January 1911, Alexander Calhoun, a thirty-one-year-old graduate of Queen's University, was appointed Calgary's Librarian. Calhoun served as the head of the Calgary Public Library until his retirement in 1945.

When a new downtown central library was constructed in the early 1960s, the original branch was renamed the Memorial Park branch, and still operates today. An addition to the 1960s Central Library was built in 1974, doubling the size of the building.

=== 21st century ===
In 2013, CNOOC subsidiary Nexen donated 1.5M dollars to the Calgary Public Library. The company has secured the naming rights for high tech learning commons in the new Calgary Central Library. CNOOC CEO Li Fanrong reiterated the gesture was motivated by the company's corporate responsibilities to Calgary. There have been concerns of censorship as CNOOC is a Chinese state run company, however McIntyre Royston library foundation head assures that the library's collection won't be censored.

Logo used prior to rebranding in January 2015

The location of the new library is in the Downtown East Village (just across 3rd St. S.E. from the new City Hall). On February 25, 2013, City Hall was approved the master plan to have the new library be built at the fore-mentioned location at Downtown East Village with the overall cost of CA$245 million. The 286,000-square foot complex was completed on November 1, 2018.

In 2019, the new library was recognized as one of "The Worlds 100 Greatest Places of 2019" by Time magazine.

In 2019, Calgary opened Seton Library at the World's Largest YMCA (Brookfield Residential YMCA at Seton).

During the COVID-19 pandemic, the library introduced expanded online services for patrons and provided health resources developed by 19 to Zero, a health communications initiative led by Alberta students.

In 2024, Calgary opened its first all-digital Library space in the NE Community of Skyview Ranch.

== Branches ==
=== Southwest Community Libraries ===
- Giuffre Family Library (1954-) - 3223 14 Street SW
- Memorial Park Library (1912-) - 1221 2 Street SW (closed as a branch between 1967-1977 and used as a storage facility)
- Nicholls Family Library (2016-) - 1421 33 Street SW (at Westbrook LRT station)
- Signal Hill Library (1998-) - 5994 Signal Hill Centre SW
- Southwood Library (1966-) - 924 Southland Drive SW

=== Southeast Community Libraries ===
- Central Library (2018-) - 800 3 Street SE (replaced former W.R. Castell Central Library)
- Fish Creek Library (1985-) - 11161 Bonaventure Drive SE
- Forest Lawn Library (1962-) - 4807 8 Avenue SE (Forest Lawn opened as a town library in 1951, joining the Calgary system in 1962)
- Quarry Park Library (2016-)- 108 Quarry Park Road SE (at Remington YMCA)
- Seton Library (2019-) - 4995 Market Street SE (at Brookfield Residential YMCA)
- Shawnessy Library (2001-) - 333 Shawville Boulevard S.E. (at Cardel Rec South)

=== Northwest Community Libraries ===
- Bowness Library (1964-) - 6532 Bowness Road NW (New location opened 2012. Bowness opened as a town library in 1958, joining the Calgary system in 1964.)
- Crowfoot Library (2003-) - 8665 Nose Hill Drive NW
- Judith Umbach Library (1974-) - 6617 Centre Street N
- Louise Riley Library (1959-) - 1904 14 Avenue NW
- Nose Hill Library (1988-) - 1530 Northmount Drive NW
- Rocky Ridge Library (2017-) - 11300 Rocky Ridge Road NW (at Shane Homes YMCA)
- Sage Hill Library (2017-) - 19 Sage Hill Passage NW - Temporary Library until final Sage Hill Library is completed

=== Northeast Community Libraries ===
- Country Hills Library (2004-) - 11950 Country Village Link N.E.
- Prototype: Skyview (2024-) - Unit 1620, 6004 Country Hills Blvd NE (Calgary's first "all-digital" Library space)
- Saddletowne Library (2012-) - 150 7555 Falconridge Boulevard NE (at the Genesis Centre)
- Village Square Library (1983-) - 2623 56 Street N.E. (at Village Square Leisure Centre)

== Former branches ==
- Crescent Heights Library (1913–1943) - 1806 1 Street NW
- Crescent Heights Library (1943–1994) - 1304 Centre Street NE
- Inglewood Library (1946–1953) - 1334A 9 Avenue SE
- Hillhurst Library (1947–1970) - 1135 Kensington Road SE
- Glengarry Library (1950–1976) - 2609 19 Avenue SW
- Former Bowness Library Locations (1964-)(Bowness opened as a town library in 1958, joining the Calgary system in 1964) - multiple addresses
- Administration Building & Technical Reference Library (1958–1963) - 624 9 Avenue SW
- Chinook Mall Library (1960–1998) - B55-6457 Macleod Trail SW
- W.R. Castell Central Library (1963–2018) - 616 Macleod Tr S.E.
- Westbrook Library (1964–1970) - 24-1200 37 Street SW
- Georgina Thomson Library (1965–2003) - 772 Northmount Drive NW
- Downtown branch (1967–1977) 527 7th Avenue SW
- Sir Winston Churchill Community Library (1970–1975) - 5220 37 Street NW
- Shaganappi Library (1970–2016) - 3415 8 Avenue SW
- Varsity Library (1976–1988) - 4616 Varsity Drive NW
- Macleod Library (1979–1985) - 100-10325 Bonaventure Drive SE
- Millican-Ogden Library (1986–2001) - 7005 18 Street SE
- Midnapore Library (1998–2001) - 240 Midpark Way SE
- Glenmore Square Library (2001–2016) - 7740 18 Street SE

== Renamed branches ==
- Judith Umbach Library (formerly Thorn-Hill Library) was renamed after a major renovation in 2015 and for funds donated by Judith Umbach.
- Nicholls Family Library (formerly Westbrook Library) was named to commemorate a donation made the Nicholls family.
- Giuffre Family Library (formerly Alexander Calhoun Library) was renamed to commemorate a donation made by the Giuffre family. A section was commemorated to Alexander Calhoun at Memorial Park Library.

== Services ==
- Information and reference services
- Access to full text databases
- Community information
- Internet access
- Programs for children, youth and adults
- Delivery to home-bound individuals
- Inter-library loans
- Free downloadable audiobooks
- Printing services at all locations except Rocky Ridge Library
- Faxing services at all locations except Rocky Ridge Library
- Wellness desk at Central and Crowfoot Libraries
- Free program and study rooms at all locations except Rocky Ridge Library
- Musical instrument lending at Memorial Park Library

== Statistics ==
Calgary Public Library Facts (2012):

- Annual circulation: 17,121,718 (including renewals)
- Number of items in collection: 2,195,354
- Total number of books to choose from: 1,689,315
- Total number of e-books to choose from: 61,000 (2013 Report to the Community)
- Total number of music items to choose from: 155.563
- Total number of magazines to choose from: 87,648
- Total number of Blu-rays/DVDs to choose from: 188,005
- Percentage of households that utilize the Calgary Public Library: 66%
- Number of Calgarians who hold a library card: 670,000 + (2018)

== See also ==
- List of Carnegie libraries in Canada
