= Calgary Telus Convention Centre =

Convention centre in Alberta, Canada

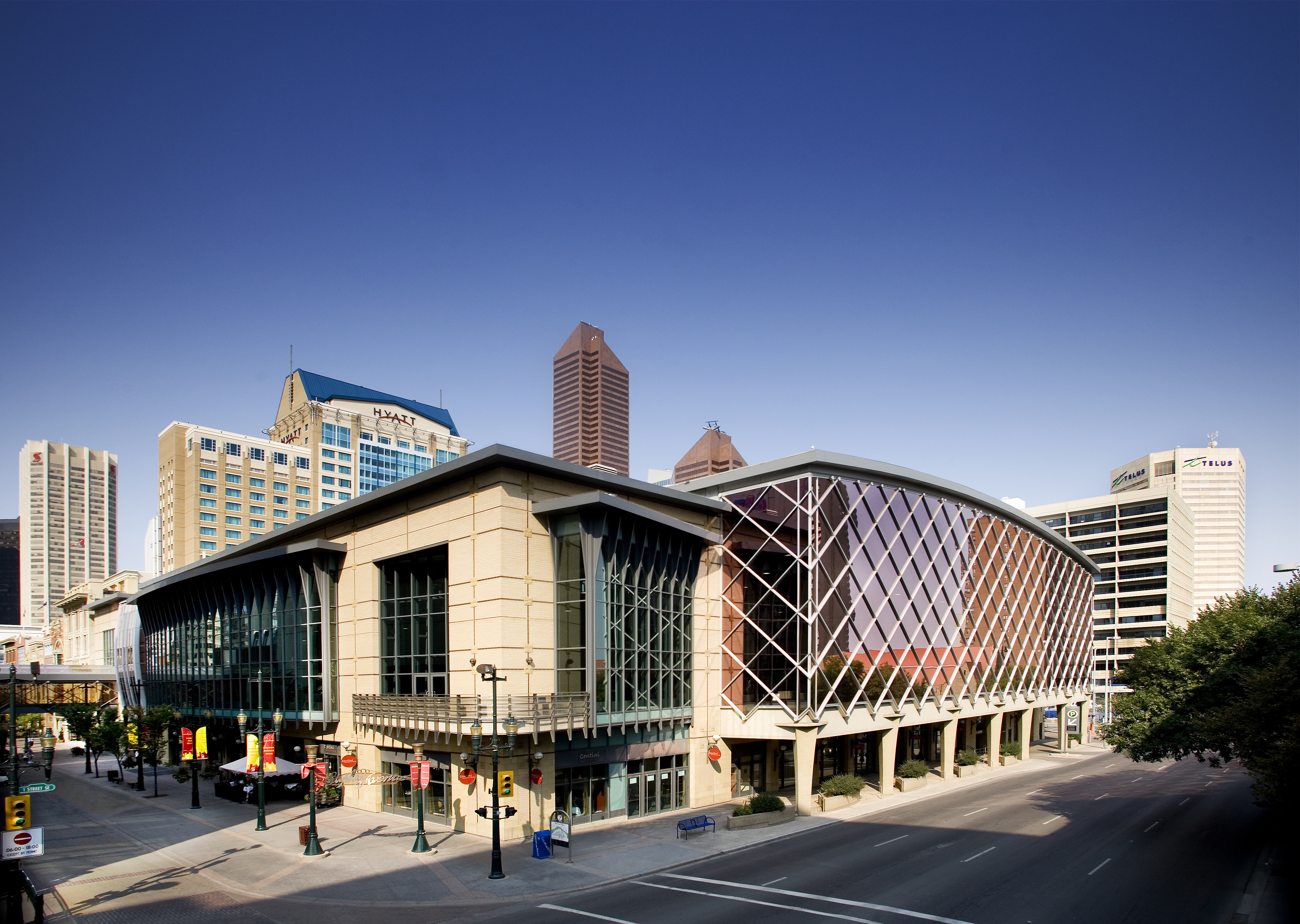
- View of the north building from Macleod Trail SE
- Interactive map of Calgary Telus Convention Centre
- Former names: Calgary Convention Centre (1974–1996)
- Address: 136 8 Ave SE; Calgary, Alberta, Canada
- Coordinates: 51.045579°N 114.061542°W
- Owner: City of Calgary
- Operator: Calgary Convention Centre Authority
- Public transit: Centre Street station

Construction
- Opened: November 15, 1974
- Expanded: 2000
- Construction cost: CA$32.1 million
- Architect: Dale and Associates

Website
- Calgary Telus Convention Centre

Calgary Telus Convention Centre (CTCC) is a convention centre in Calgary, Alberta, Canada. Opened in 1974 as the first purpose built convention centre in the country, it was originally known as the Calgary Convention Centre, and is operated by the Calgary Convention Centre Authority on behalf of the City of Calgary. The facility offers 122,000 square feet of convention space, over 47,000 square feet of exhibit space, five pre-function areas and 36 meeting rooms.

In December 1996, the facility was renamed as Calgary Telus Convention Centre due to a naming rights agreement with Telus. In 2000, it was expanded with the addition of the north building, which encompasses the historic Neilson Block.

== History ==
=== Canada's First Million Dollar Dinner ===
In 1979, the Calgary Foundation held a fundraising dinner in Macleod Hall, where the event raised $2 million (equivalent to $13 million in 2025), which organizers described as the first time $1 million dollars had been raised at a single fundraiser dinner in Canada.

=== COVID-19 response ===
In March 2020, the Calgary Telus Convention Centre was temporarily repurposed as an emergency shelter to support individuals experiencing homelessness during the COVID-19 pandemic. The facility was later used as a mass immunization site and became Alberta’s largest COVID-19 vaccination clinic. The Centre returned to its primary function as a convention and events venue following the lifting of pandemic-related restrictions.

== Accessibility ==
The Calgary Telus Convention Centre has a partnership with Pedesting, a navigation application providing step-free wayfinding around the Centre and parts of the Calgary downtown core. The CTCC was among the first six buildings to be included in the app when it launched its Calgary coverage.

The CTCC has consulted with Pedesting co-founder, Nabeel Ramji, on renovations to ensure they are fully accessible. In January 2025, the CTCC completed an all-persons washroom in the North Building as part of this work.

== Facilities ==
The convention centre is divided between the north and south sides of Stephen Avenue, with its buildings connected through Calgary’s +15 network.

Between the North and South Buildings, the CTCC offers:

- 122,000 sq ft (11,300 m^{2}) of convention space
- 47,000 sq ft (4,400 m^{2}) of exhibition space
- Two exhibition halls with pre-function areas
  - Exhibition Hall (North Building)
  - Macleod Hall (South Building)
- 36 meeting rooms
- Balcony space overlooking Stephen Avenue

The centre is integrated into downtown Calgary’s pedestrian network via the +15 system, including direct connection to three hotels: the Calgary Marriott Downtown, the Hyatt Regency Calgary, and the Fairmont Palliser.

== Major events ==
Former United States President George W. Bush, former California Governor Arnold Schwarzenegger, and former United Kingdom Prime Minister Tony Blair each gave public speeches at the Calgary Telus Convention Centre following the end of their respective political careers.

Reoccurring events held at the venue include:

- Calgary Economic Development's Report to the Community
- Otafest
- Art Market Craft Sale
- SocialWest
- Bridal Expo YYC
- GeoConvention

== Notable incidents ==
=== 2017 lawsuit ===
In 2017, a lawsuit was filed in relation to an arrest that occurred during a political event held at the Calgary Telus Convention Centre. The case involved claims related to the arrest and the parties named included security personnel and police. As of 2020, no further resolution of the lawsuit had been reported.

=== 2020 discussion of future role ===
In March 2020, Calgary city councillor Ward Sutherland suggested that the City of Calgary reassess the long-term role of the Calgary Telus Convention Centre in light of the planned expansion of other convention facilities in the city. No formal changes to the Centre’s ownership or mandate were announced following the discussion.

=== Hosting of Tucker Carlson event ===
On January 24, 2024, the Calgary Telus Convention Centre hosted a live speaking event featuring American political commentator Tucker Carlson, which drew criticism from local advocacy groups and members of Calgary’s LGBTQ+ community.

== See also ==
- List of attractions and landmarks in Calgary
