= Otafest =

Anime convention in Calgary

- The O-Wing, Otafest's primary logo
- Status: Active
- Venue: Calgary Telus Convention Centre
- Locations: Calgary, Alberta
- Country: Canada
- Inaugurated: 1999
- Attendance: 12,252 (2025)
- Organizer: Otafest Film & Cultural Festival Planning Committee
- Filing status: Non-profit organization
- Website: otafest.com

Otafest is an annual anime convention held in May (and previously September, mid-June, or early July), at the Calgary Telus Convention Centre, in Calgary, Alberta, Canada. The first Otafest was held 1999 and has expanded each year, including a move in 2009 to include a mini-convention called Otafest Lite, which was replaced in 2012 with Otafest Aurora. At the closing ceremonies in 2015, it was announced that Otafest would be moving to the Calgary Telus Convention Centre from the University of Calgary for Otafest 2016 with a new date, July 1–3, however the event dates returned to May after Otafest 2017. As of May 2015, it is the third largest anime convention in Western Canada. Otafest is a fully volunteer-run non-profit, and has raised over $219,000 CAD for charitable initiatives since its inception.

== Mandate ==
Otafest is a Calgary-based nonprofit organization expressing the values of charity, quality, and transparency. The body of their activity pertains to the promotion of Japanese art, culture, and media in the Canadian community, and the organization rests firmly on the spirit of community collaboration and volunteerism.

== History ==
Otafest was scheduled to occur May 15–17, 2020 but was postponed to 2021 due to the coronavirus pandemic.

=== Otafest event history ===
Dates	Location	Atten.	Guests
July 3–4, 1999	University of Calgary; Calgary, Alberta	700	
June 17–18, 2000	University of Calgary; Calgary, Alberta	900	Yasuyuki Ueda.
September 15–16, 2001	University of Calgary; Calgary, Alberta	700	
May 24–26, 2002	University of Calgary; Calgary, Alberta		
May 24–25, 2003	University of Calgary Science Theaters; Calgary, Alberta		
May 15–16, 2004	University of Calgary; Calgary, Alberta		The 404s.
May 21–22, 2005	University of Calgary; Calgary, Alberta		Jonathan Love.
May 21–22, 2006	University of Calgary; Calgary, Alberta		
May 19–20, 2007	University of Calgary; Calgary, Alberta	2,709	The 404s.
May 16–18, 2008	University of Calgary; Calgary, Alberta	4,278	The 404s, Mohammad "Hawk" Haque, Dr. Antonia Levi, Jonathan Love, Midnight Taiko, Ananth Panagariya, Dave Rathnow, and Shin Ken Kai Nobara.
May 15–17, 2009	University of Calgary; Calgary, Alberta	4,361	The 404s, Johnny Yong Bosch, Mohammad "Hawk" Haque, Bob the Chair, Dr. Antonia Levi, Midnight Taiko, Ananth Panagariya.
May 21–23, 2010	University of Calgary; Calgary, Alberta	3,697	The 404s, Michelle Ruff, Todd Haberkorn, Scott Ramsoomair, Synaptic Chaos Theatre, Midnight Taiko, Dave Rathnow & Shin Ken Kai Nobara, Thwomp, Pinko Polkadotsu.
May 20–22, 2011	University of Calgary; Calgary, Alberta	4,135	The Fool, Midnight Taiko, Dave Rathnow & Shin Ken Kai Nobara, Sun Ergos, Synaptic Chaos Theatre, Thwomp.
May 18–20, 2012	University of Calgary; Calgary, Alberta	4,938	Andrea Libman, Brendan Hunter, Lix, Thwomp, Midnight Taiko, Dave Rathnow & Shin Ken Kai Nobara, Synaptic Chaos Theatre.
May 17–19, 2013	University of Calgary; Calgary, Alberta	4,947	Michael Daingerfield, Carol-Anne Day, Lucas Gilbertson, Adam Hunter, Brendan Hunter, Midnight Taiko, Kirby Morrow, Dave Rathnow & Shin Ken Kai Nobara, Scott Roberts, Kieran Strange, Synaptic Chaos Theatre, Umbrella.
May 16–18, 2014	University of Calgary; Calgary, Alberta	7,787	Yuu Asakawa, Chris Cason, Brad Swaile, Yaya Han, Midnight Taiko, Dave Rathnow, Rose Noire, Chii Sakurabi, Kieran Strange, Synaptic Chaos Theatre, Thwomp.
May 15–17, 2015	University of Calgary; Calgary, Alberta	8,144	Shinichi Watanabe, UchuSentai:Noiz, Meg Turney, Synaptic Chaos Theatre, Dave Rathnow, Toby Proctor, Midnight Taiko, Jessica Merizan, Yui Makino, Quinton Flynn, Randy "Birdy" Crisologo, Linda Ballantyne.
July 1–3, 2016	Calgary Telus Convention Centre; Calgary, Alberta	7,995 (warm); 17,605 (turnstile)	Johnny Yong Bosch, Todd Haberkorn, J. Michael Tatum, Nogod, Kamui Cosplay, Smile.dk, Shinichi Watanabe, Drunk Gaming, Justin Currie, Yumi Akai, Yaya Han, Synaptic Chaos Theatre, Brendan Hunter, Caitlynne Medrek.
June 30 – July 2, 2017	Calgary Telus Convention Centre; Calgary, Alberta	7,724 (warm); 17,267 (turnstile)	Carolina Ravassa, Jerry Jewell, The Runaway Guys, Gladzy Kei, Jill Frappier, Ron Rubin, Pingame, Reika Cosplay, James Landino, WTCHDCTR, Drunk Gaming, Tracey Moore, Birdy, Synaptic Chaos Theatre
May 18–20, 2018	Calgary Telus Convention Centre; Calgary, Alberta	9,572 (warm); 21,040 (turnstile)	Capcom Live!, Leon Chiro, Andy Rae, Leah Clark, Caitlin Glass, Matthew Mercer, Jinnie McManus, Midnight Taiko, Synaptic Chaos Theatre, Fakku, Arda Wigs
May 17–19, 2019	Calgary Telus Convention Centre; Calgary, Alberta	9,222 (warm); 19,822 (turnstile)	SungWon Cho, Wendee Lee, The Slants, FAKKU, Rider4Z, Mary Elizabeth McGlynn, Steve Blum, James Landino, Rusty Meeks, Rocky Mountain Taiko
May 21–22, 2022	Calgary Telus Convention Centre; Calgary, Alberta	9,122 (warm); 15,456 (turnstile)	The 404s, Griffin Burns, Fighting Dreamers Productions, Brendan Hunter, Jinnie McManus, Keith Silverstein, A.K. Wirru
May 19–21, 2023	Calgary Telus Convention Centre; Calgary, Alberta	11,469 (warm); 26,044 (turnstile)	The 404s, Lucien Dodge, Brendan Hunter, Erica Lindbeck, Jinnie McManus, Erica Mendez, Rock M. Sakura, Windrise, Shellanin, Dave Rodgers, Digital Planet, Girl_DM_, KristiclesGG, Yosakoi Soran Calgary, Yama no Oto, Anime Night Club 3, The Runaway Guys, NΣΣT
May 10–12, 2024	Calgary Telus Convention Centre; Calgary, Alberta	11,765 (warm); 26,169 (turnstile)	The 404s, Anime Night Club 3, Ben Balmaceda, Amber Lee Connors, Larissa Crawford, Brendan Hunter, Michaela Jill Murphy, Rider4Z, True, Vivid Vision, Yukana
May 16–18, 2025	Calgary Telus Convention Centre; Calgary, Alberta	12,252 (warm); 26,754 (turnstile)	The 404s, AdvanceRatio, Aurora Matrix, Autumn Cosplay, Allegra Clark, CottontailVA, girl_dm_, Chris Hackney, Nagi Yanagi, Jonah Scott, Rie Tanaka, Kaiji Tang, Yama no Oto, Yosoca, Joe Zieja
May 15–17, 2026	Calgary Telus Convention Centre; Calgary, Alberta	32,125 (turnstile)	The 404s, AdvanceRatio, Bryson Baugus, Kira Buckland, Eboni La'Belle, FroggyLoch, Lia, Mayonazy, Kyle McCarley, Miura Ayme & Miko, Papamutt, PorcelainMaid, Alejandro Saab, Van Goth, Howard Wang, Joshua Waters, Yama no Oto, Yosoca
May 21–23, 2027	Calgary Telus Convention Centre; Calgary, Alberta		

=== Otafest Lite/Aurora event history ===
==== Otafest Lite ====
Dates	Location	Atten.	Guests
November 14, 2009	University of Calgary; Calgary, Alberta	900 (estimated)	
November 13, 2010	University of Calgary; Calgary, Alberta	800 (estimated)	
November 12, 2011	University of Calgary; Calgary, Alberta	700 (estimated)	

==== Otafest Aurora ====
Dates	Location	Atten.	Guests
December 15, 2012	University of Calgary Downtown Campus; Calgary, Alberta	843	Samuel Vincent, Maryke Hendrikse
November 30, 2013	University of Calgary Downtown Campus; Calgary, Alberta	1,716	Andrea Libman, Tabitha St. Germain, Thwomp
November 29, 2014	SAIT Polytechnic; Calgary, Alberta	2,040	Carol-Anne Day, Brendan Hunter, Cherami Leigh, J. Michael Tatum, Kieran Strange, Twinfools & Nova Cosplay
November 13–14, 2015	SAIT Polytechnic; Calgary, Alberta	2,542	Vic Mignogna, Ani-Mia, Josh Hart
November 4–5, 2016	SAIT Polytechnic; Calgary, Alberta	1,824	Eric Stuart, Stephanie Sheh, Enayla Cosplay
