= One Yellow Rabbit =

- Formation: 1982
- Type: Theatre group
- Location: Calgary, Alberta, Canada
- Website: oyr.org

One Yellow Rabbit Performance Theatre (OYR) is a theater company based in the Big Secret Theatre in Calgary's Arts Commons. With its Resident Performing Ensemble, OYR creates original theatrical works each year for its audiences.

OYR was founded as a collective in 1982 and coalesced into the OYR Performing Ensemble some years later. The company’s philosophy and practice have been influenced by contemporary dance, the Artist-run centre movement, and the Punk subculture.

In 1987, OYR produced the Secret Elevator Experimental Performance Festival, later renamed the High Performance Rodeo in 1988. The festival has grown annually in audience, venues, and impact, surpassing 10,000 attendees in 2006 and 16,000 in 2009. It now reaches over 20,000 audience members every year. The Rodeo features theatre, dance, music and multimedia presentations from across Canada and abroad. Artists presented in recent years range from emerging artists to Philip Glass, Catalyst Theatre, Electric Company Theatre, Compagnie Marie Chouinard, Laurie Anderson, Andy Jones, members of The Kids In the Hall, Les Deux Mondes, Peggy Baker, Daniel MacIvor, Patrick Graham, and the OYR Ensemble itself.

The Rodeo formerly had as its patron His Excellency Jean-Daniel Lafond, who with his wife, Governor General Michaëlle Jean, attended performances and hosted three “Art Matters” community forums as part of the festival.

OYR has toured across North America, Australia, Asia, Mexico and Europe. The 1990s saw a large increase in the number and frequency of tours, starting with the productions The Erotic Irony of Old Glory and Ilsa, Queen of the Nazi Love Camp. Scotland's Traverse Theatre was often the launching pad for international tours.

In 1995, OYR expanded the Secret Theatre into the Big Secret Theatre, increasing its technical versatility and doubling its seating to 130. Seating was further upgraded in 2002 to a potential 249 (although most theatre shows play in the 189-seat configuration.)

In 1998, OYR's Denise Clarke founded the Summer Lab Intensive School of performance creation, which was attended by 20 students from across Canada. The 2009 Lab was the 13th annual edition. 250 “rabbits” have graduated.

In 2003, Banff Centre Press published Wild Theatre: The History of One Yellow Rabbit by Martin Morrow. The book contains prefaces by Ronnie Burkett and Factory Theatre's Ken Gass.

== See also ==
- List of festivals in Calgary
