= Calgary Municipal Building =

City hall in Calgary, Alberta, Canada

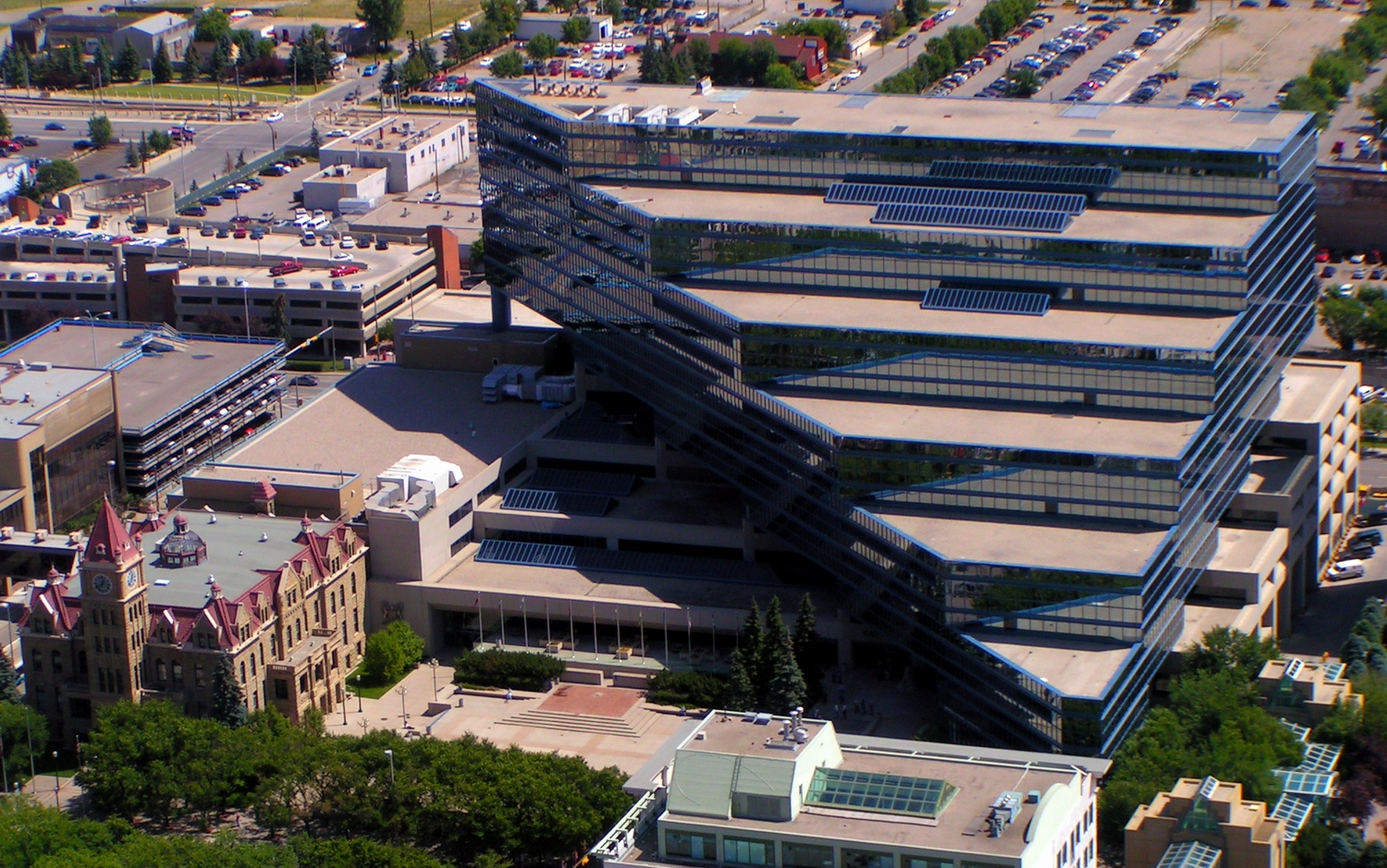
- The Calgary Municipal Building dwarfs the Calgary City Hall in downtown Calgary.
- Interactive map of the Calgary Municipal Building area

General information
- Type: City hall
- Architectural style: Postmodern architecture
- Location: 800 Macleod Trail SE; Calgary, Alberta; T2G 5E6
- Coordinates: 51.0456°N 114.0565°W
- Construction started: 1982
- Completed: October 1985
- Inaugurated: October 18, 1985
- Cost: $97,000,000 ($253 million in 2025 dollars)
- Client: City of Calgary
- Owner: City of Calgary

Height
- Height: 56.26 m (185 ft)

Technical details
- Floor count: 14
- Floor area: 74,000m² (800,000ft²)

Design and construction
- Architect: Christopher Ballyn
- Architecture firm: WZMH Architects
- Structural engineer: Quinn Dressel Jokinen
- Main contractor: EllisDon

References
- Calgary HeraldEmporis

The Calgary Municipal Building, often referred to as New City Hall, is the seat of local government for the city of Calgary, Alberta, Canada. The building has been the centre for civic administration for the City of Calgary since it opened in 1985 to consolidate city administration, provide council chambers, and complement old Calgary City Hall, which is used as the offices of the mayor and councillors.

The structure currently houses 2,000 city employees and is open to the public on weekdays.

== History ==
=== Planning ===
Mayor Ross Alger's vision for a civic center, headlined by new municipal headquarters surrounded by a major hotel, park space and commercial real estate was put to the test in a 1979 plebiscite. The Calgary public responded by voting 51% against and 49% for Alger's vision. Alger's successor, Ralph Klein, spearhead a different strategy to assess public opinion focused on whether the City of Calgary should continue to lease private office space, or consolidate employees in a single building. By 1982, city staff were spread across 10 buildings, costing the government $1.9 million per year in rent.

Calgary City Council commissioned a poll of residents, spending $80,000 in 1980 to ask whether they would support a new city owned municipal building built on city owned land in the downtown core, and whether another plebiscite was necessary. The poll concluded with 13,245 responses which were generally in favor of constructing a city-owned municipal building near Old City Hall. Klein received a mandate to construct the new municipal building following the second plebiscite was held on October 15, 1980, on whether the city should own or rent the future space, with an overwhelming majority of Calgary residents totaling 97,172 agreeing with the proposal and 38,120 in favor of leasing a building.

The design of the Calgary Municipal Building endured significant criticism from residents, aldermen and others. During the Federation of Canadian Municipalities Conference in June 1985, two unnamed members of Toronto City Council were quoted by the Calgary Herald describing the Municipal Building as "a monstrosity", which was echoed by Gerald Forseth, the former president of the Alberta Architects Association. The City of Toronto purchased an advertisement in the Calgary Herald on October 12, 1985, to congratulate the City of Calgary on completing the construction of the new Municipal Building.

=== Design ===
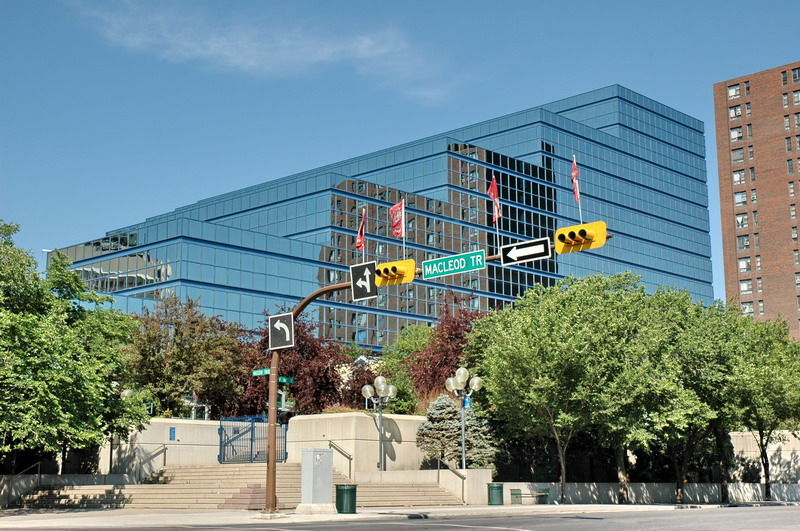
Calgary City Hall as seen from MacLeod Trail.

The new Municipal Building was designed through an open competition sponsored by the city council to select the design and architect for the new building. The competition opened in early 1981 to all registered architects in Alberta, with invitations to participate sent by the city to all members of the Alberta Association of Architects. The competition called for the design of a new municipal building, the restoration and inclusion of Old City Hall and the attached administration building, and a public open space on the site built in relationship with the three structures.

A total of 62 architects entered the competition, following the first stage four finalists were announced, R. L. Wilkin, Eugene N. Dub (who would go on to design Edmonton City Hall), Gerald J. Gongos, and Christopher Ballyn. On December 4, 1981, Christopher Ballyn in partnership with WZMH Architects was chosen as the design winner, and a contract was awarded by Calgary City Council.

Ballyn's design called for the new Municipal Building to serve as a foil to Old City Hall, providing a neutral backdrop while also displaying a fresh and unique civic image. The mirrored facade facing Old City Hall at a 45° angle was chosen to reflect the historic building and the new public plaza, while minimizing the Municipal Building's apparent volume. The lower floors of the Municipal Building feature molded limestone clad walls to reflect the spirit and material of the neighbouring City Hall, while the upper floors provide a sleek, sophisticated and intricate curtain wall in contrast.

=== Construction ===
To finance the Municipal Building, Calgary City Council passed a borrowing bylaw enabling $124-million in borrowing capacity, which was above the estimated $92-million cost and $12-million in lifetime interest charges.

=== Time capsule ===
During construction the City of Calgary installed a time capsule in the Municipal Building to be opened after 99 years in 2084. The capsule which sits below a bronze plaque and showcases life in Calgary in 1985, including pins, a key from the old Imperial Hotel, and designs for the Municipal Building.

== Architecture ==
The Calgary Municipal Building sits on a triangle footprint, with a silver reflective mirror glass curtain wall exterior that expands from the narrowest point of the footprint upwards six steps. Limestone veneer paneling is present on the lower vertical walls. Outside of the building is a ceremonial plaza which extends to the southern wall of Old City Hall.

The central atrium spans 12-stories in height, walled by concrete and glass windows of employee offices, and capped with a rooftop skylight. The atrium connects to the offices of various City of Calgary employees using escalators and glass elevators. The council chambers are housed within a large blue cube on the first floor with the councillors seated in a semi-circle facing the public, with four entrances and capacity for 300 people. A raised corridor connects the council chambers to Old City Hall, allowing councillors to enter and exit.

An underground LRT station was constructed in the 1980s under the Calgary Municipal Building in the event the City Hall CTrain station would be moved underground.

== See also ==
- Calgary City Hall
- Calgary City Council
