= Calgary Economic Development =

Economic development agency for the City of Calgary

- Abbreviation: CED
- Formation: July 1999
- Type: Wholly owned municipal subsidiary; Not-for-profit company
- Purpose: Economic development
- Headquarters: Calgary, Alberta, Canada
- Region served: Calgary metropolitan region
- President and CEO: Brad Parry
- Parent organization: The City of Calgary
- Website: https://www.calgaryeconomicdevelopment.com/

Calgary Economic Development (CED) is the economic development agency for the City of Calgary in Canada. The company is incorporated as Calgary Economic Development Ltd., a municipal subsidiary that reports to city council through governance committees as a civic partner.

== History ==
Calgary Economic Development Ltd. was incorporated in July 1999.

Mary Moran served as president and chief executive from 2015 to 2021 and retired in May 2021. Brad Parry, interim chief executive from 2021, was appointed president and CEO in 2022.

== Strategy and programs ==
CED stewards the city’s economic strategy and tracks progress across talent, livability, business environment, innovation and brand. The agency hosts annual events such as the Economic Outlook and the Report to the Community, which highlight data covering Calgary's overall economy.

=== Opportunity Calgary Investment Fund ===
The Opportunity Calgary Investment Fund (OCIF) is a municipally controlled investment fund established by city council in 2018 to accelerate diversification and job creation. CED provides administrative and evaluation services to the fund and its board. In April 2025, council approved a further C$60 million to extend OCIF, with yearly reporting requirements for each C$15 million tranche.

=== Workforce and reskilling ===
In partnership with national organizations and post-secondary institutions, CED has supported workforce transition into technology roles. The Information and Communications Technology Council documents the EDGE UP and EDGE UP 2.0 upskilling programs for displaced energy workers in Calgary, delivered with Future Skills Centre funding and local partners.

== Branding ==
On 17 April 2024, CED, Tourism Calgary and the City unveiled Blue Sky City as Calgary’s civic brand, replacing the previous Be Part of the Energy slogan. 129 organizations were consulted for the rebrand and a rollout would occur over subsequent months

== Reception and controversy ==
Media and public commentary have focused on two areas: branding and OCIF transparency.

- Branding and rollout. Within the government there were raised criticisms about the necessity of a rebrand. The Blue Sky City branding was expected to cost about C$4.8 million and that several months after the unveiling, the visible rollout lagged on signage. By March 2025, newly branded signage had been installed.
- OCIF reporting and oversight. When council renewed OCIF funding in April 2025, reporting and transparency were discussed and calls came from councilors for closer tracking of deployment. While the overall program showed "plenty of success" a new framework was developed which included an annual review requirement before each funding tranche.

== Leadership ==
- Mary Moran, president and CEO, 2015 to 2021; retired May 2021.
- Brad Parry, president and CEO from 2022; previously interim chief executive from 2021.

== See also ==
- Calgary Municipal Land Corporation
