= Werklund Centre =

Multi-venue arts centre in Calgary, Alberta, Canada

Coordinates: 51°02′43″N 114°03′33″W

- Company type: Not-for-profit; Registered Canadian charity
- Founded: 1985
- Headquarters: Calgary, Alberta, Canada
- Key people: Alex Sarian (President & CEO)
- Website: werklundcentre.ca

Werklund Centre (formerly Arts Commons and, prior to that, the EPCOR Centre for the Performing Arts) is a multi-venue arts centre in downtown Calgary, Alberta, Canada, located in the Olympic Plaza Cultural District. Occupying a full city block and comprising more than 560,000 square feet (52,000 m^{2}) of facilities, it is among the largest performing arts centres in Canada.

The centre is home to six resident companies: Alberta Theatre Projects, Arts Commons Presents, Calgary Philharmonic Orchestra, Downstage, One Yellow Rabbit, and Theatre Calgary. Almost 400,000 people attend more than 1,800 performances and events annually, and roughly 200 community groups use the facilities each year.

== History ==
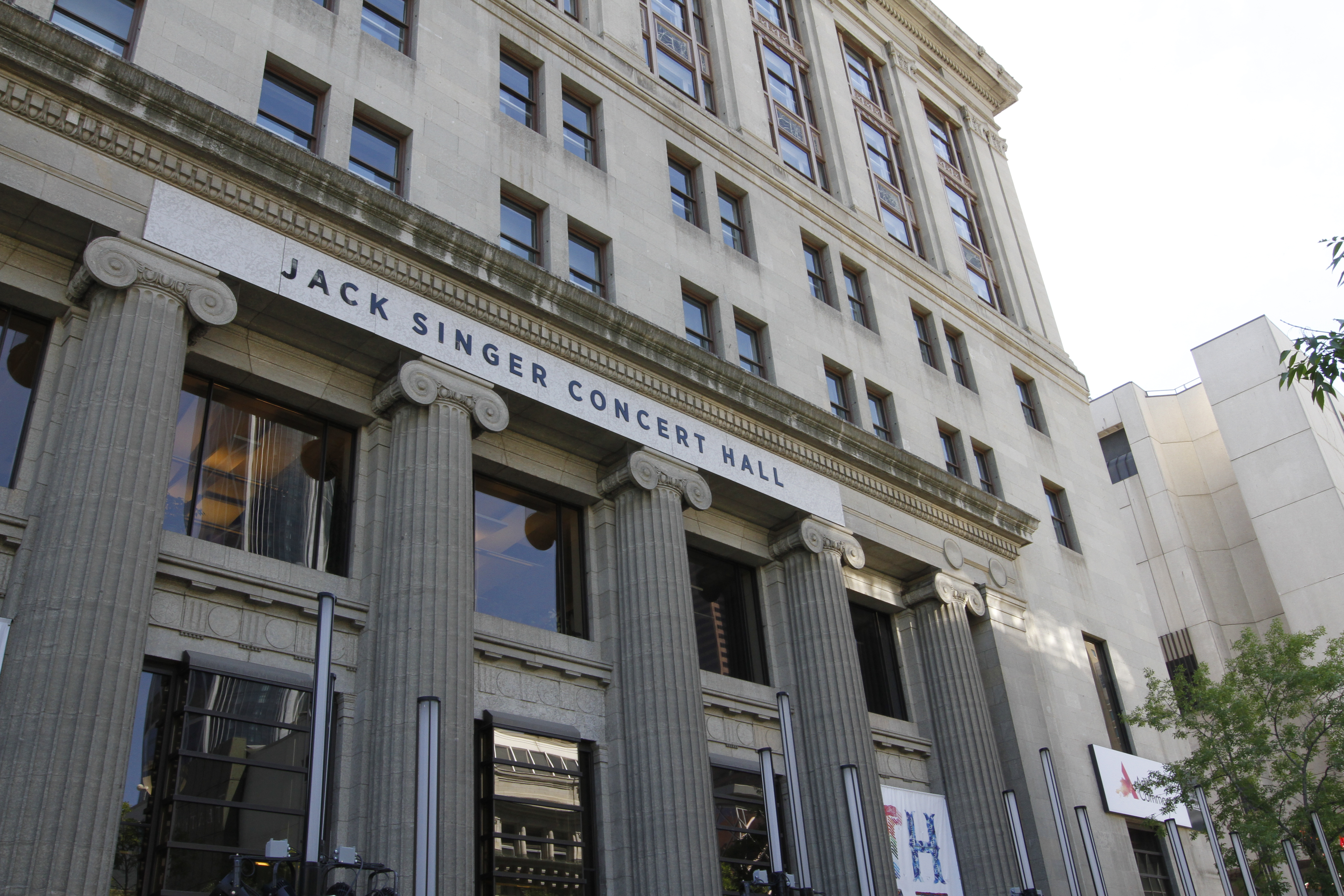

The oldest part of the block that houses Werklund Centre is the Burns Building, named after Calgarian Pat Burns. In the late 1970s, demolition was proposed to clear land for a new performing arts centre, but demolition proposals were defeated by the Calgary City Council by one vote. The adjacent Calgary Public Building (completed 1930–31) was also integrated and today houses City of Calgary offices and forms part of the arts complex.

The centre officially opened on September 14, 1985, by then Premier of Alberta Peter Lougheed. After a donation by EPCOR, an Edmonton, Alberta-based utilities company, the name was changed to the EPCOR Centre for the Performing Arts on May 1, 2001.

On December 17, 2014, at the Annual General Meeting, it was announced that the performing arts centre would be rebranded as Arts Commons.

In June 2024, a landmark donation of $75 million from Dave Werklund and family was announced, the largest philanthropic gift to a performing arts centre in Canadian history. As a result, the facility was renamed the Werklund Centre in perpetuity.

== Transformation projects ==
The Werklund family’s 2024 gift accelerated the multi-phase Arts Commons Transformation (ACT) and Olympic Plaza Transformation (OPT) projects to modernize and expand the campus. Public funding commitments include $315.5 million from the City of Calgary and $103 million from the Government of Alberta, alongside federal contributions and private philanthropy.

In February 2025, Werklund Centre announced the Osten-Victor Playhouse, a new 1,000-seat flexible theatre named for philanthropists Al Osten and Buddy Victor after a $12 million gift; it will anchor the expanded campus. A groundbreaking ceremony was held in December 2024, with completion targeted for 2028–29.

== Amenities offered ==
Almost 400,000 people attend more than 1,800 performances and events each year at Werklund Centre. Events include live theatre, dance, spoken word, children's programming, experimental theatre, art exhibits, public forums, weddings, training sessions, meetings, arts education activities, award ceremonies, and concerts ranging from symphonic to jazz, folk, blues, world, and rock.

== Performance and other facilities ==
- Jack Singer Concert Hall, with 1,800 seats, is the largest venue in the building. Suspended above the stage is a large acoustical canopy that can be raised or lowered to tune the hall according to performance needs. The hall is the permanent home of the Calgary Philharmonic Orchestra, which employs 65 full-time musicians, and houses the 6,040-pipe Carthy Organ.
- Max Bell Theatre, a 750-seat theatre and home to Theatre Calgary.
- Martha Cohen Theatre, a 418-seat theatre and home to Alberta Theatre Projects.
- Big Secret Theatre, a 190-seat theatre and home to One Yellow Rabbit.
- Engineered Air Theatre, used for concerts, films, plays, weddings, receptions, and galas, seating up to 185.
- Motel Theatre, a 50-seat black box venue used for plays, experimental theatre and performance art, and home to Downstage.
- Osten-Victor Playhouse (announced 2025), a 1,000-seat flexible theatre anchoring the expanded Werklund Centre campus.

== Activities and performances ==
Arts Commons Presents (the presenting arm of Werklund Centre) programs several series, including the BD&P World Stage, Classic Albums Live, National Geographic Live, PCL Blues, and TD Jazz. The centre also offers free community programming through ArtsXpeditions, a pop-up performance series in Calgary public spaces.

The six resident companies, Alberta Theatre Projects, Calgary Philharmonic Orchestra, Downstage, One Yellow Rabbit, Theatre Calgary, and Arts Commons Presents, each program their own seasons, often collaborating across disciplines. The centre also provides free events such as Arts Commons Cabarets and National Indigenous Peoples Day celebrations.

== Jordan Peterson controversy ==
After the announcement of University of Toronto professor Jordan Peterson giving a lecture at Arts Commons in 2018, several Calgary arts groups addressed an open letter to the Arts Commons' Board of Directors on July 24, 2018.

The letter demanded the event be canceled, that staff be provided diversity training, and that Arts Commons issue a public apology to the "LGBT community". It expressed "deep shock and disappointment" over Arts Commons' decision to host Peterson, who had been criticized for opposing Canadian human rights legislation Bill C-16 and for his arguments against what he described as government-mandated speech laws.

The letter was signed by staff of several artist-run centres including Untitled Art Society, TRUCK Contemporary Art in Calgary, Stride Gallery, The New Gallery, along with the M:ST Performance Art Festival Society, VOICESYYC, and more than 1,200 individuals.

A responding statement written by then Arts Commons CEO Johann Zietsman expressed the organization’s support for free expression, stating that free speech meant "not censoring someone because we don't agree with what they have to say". The event was not canceled and was held on July 27, 2018.

== Censorship controversy ==
In early September 2018, The New Gallery released a statement describing what it said was censorship of trans artist Beck Gilmer-Osborne, who was exhibiting the three-channel video installation A Thousand Cuts in a vitrine space in Arts Commons and Calgary’s +15 Network. Arts Commons turned off the work, citing complaints from patrons about swearing and nudity, and sent a letter on August 29, 2018 stating that the video would have to be edited or removed.

Gilmer-Osborne responded on September 8, 2018: "rather than re-edit and censor my work to comfort certain viewers who are offended by the very banal acts of swearing and non-sexual nudity, I have decided to remove the piece from the space entirely." Arts Commons programming director Jennifer Johnson told CBC that while the piece "had merit", its language and imagery "were not a fit with our commitment to creating a public space for all".

A similar incident had occurred in 2006, when Arts Commons (then EPCOR Centre) was accused of censoring another transgender artist in the +15 walkway space. A temporary wall was installed to obscure most of the work. The piece, Gaylord Phoenix in the Flower Temple, depicted a cartoon of a gender-fluid figure touching his genitals (stylized as a paisley-patterned noodle).

== See also ==
- List of concert halls
