= Calgary City Hall =

Town hall in Calgary, Alberta, Canada

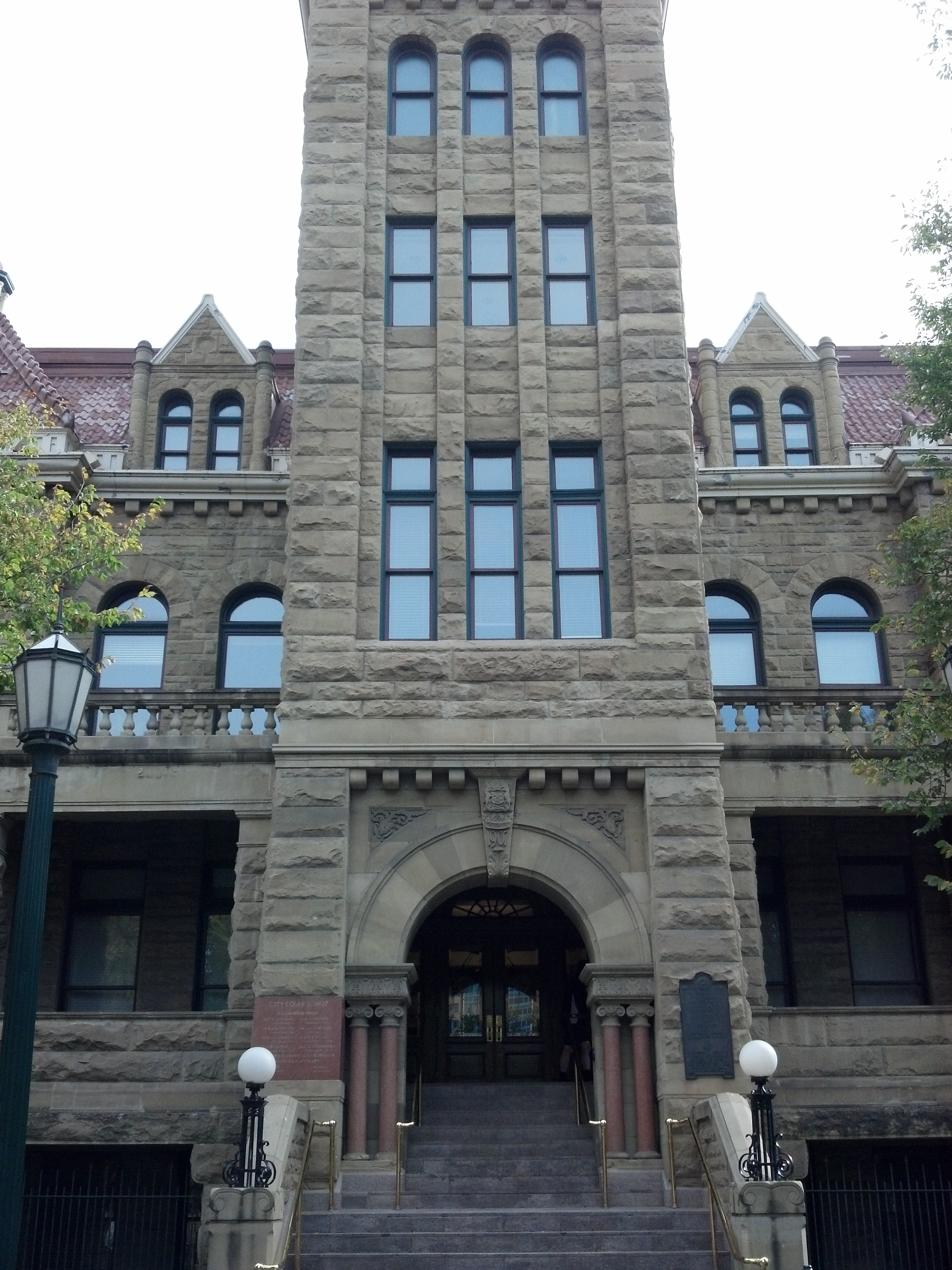
- Interactive map of the Calgary City Hall area

General information
- Type: Town hall
- Architectural style: Romanesque Revival
- Location: 716 Macleod Trail SE; Calgary, Alberta; T2G 5E6
- Coordinates: 51.0460°N 114.0574°W
- Construction started: 1907
- Completed: June 26, 1911
- Cost: $300,000 in 1911
- Client: City of Calgary
- Owner: City of Calgary

Technical details
- Floor count: 4

Design and construction
- Architect: William M. Dodd

National Historic Site of Canada
- Official name: Calgary City Hall National Historic Site of Canada
- Designated: 1984-11-23

Alberta Historic Resources Act
- Official name: Calgary City Hall
- Designated: 1978-10-18

Calgary City Hall (often called Old City Hall or Historic City Hall), is the seat of government for Calgary City Council, located in the city's downtown core of Calgary, Alberta, Canada. The historic building completed in 1911 serves as the offices for Calgary City Council, consisting of the office of the Mayor, fourteen Councillors and municipal Clerk. Calgary City Hall originally housed the municipal council and portions of administration from its completion in 1911 until the construction of the Calgary Municipal Building adjacent to Old City Hall in 1985, which currently houses the offices of 2,000 civic administrators.

Calgary City Hall is designated a National Historic Sites of Canada, as well as a Provincial Historical Resource, and Municipal Historical Resource.

== History ==
Calgary City Hall was constructed on the site of the City's first town hall, with the land donated by a private citizen in 1885, the year after the municipality was incorporated. The original wood-framed town hall only stood for a handful of years before being demolished. In the early 1900s it became apparent the growing City needed a new seat of government, and a debate ensued on the future location of the structure. In 1904, Calgary City Council found a site located on the corner of 7th Avenue and 1st Street S.E. which was suitable and available for $20,000. The plan went before the public through a pleblicite which required a two-thirds majority, and with 156 voters agreeing, and 95 against the proposition, the plan failed by a margin of 12 votes. Finally the city would settle on the site of the community's original City Hall, set back only a few feet from the current structure. The city would retain Architect William M. Dodd whose designs around Calgary included Central School (1905–1969), Clarence Block (1901), Norman Block (1902), and the Alexandra School (1904), as well as consulting on Regina's City Hall. Construction of the new structure began in 1907, and quickly encountered several financial and design issues.

=== Construction issues ===
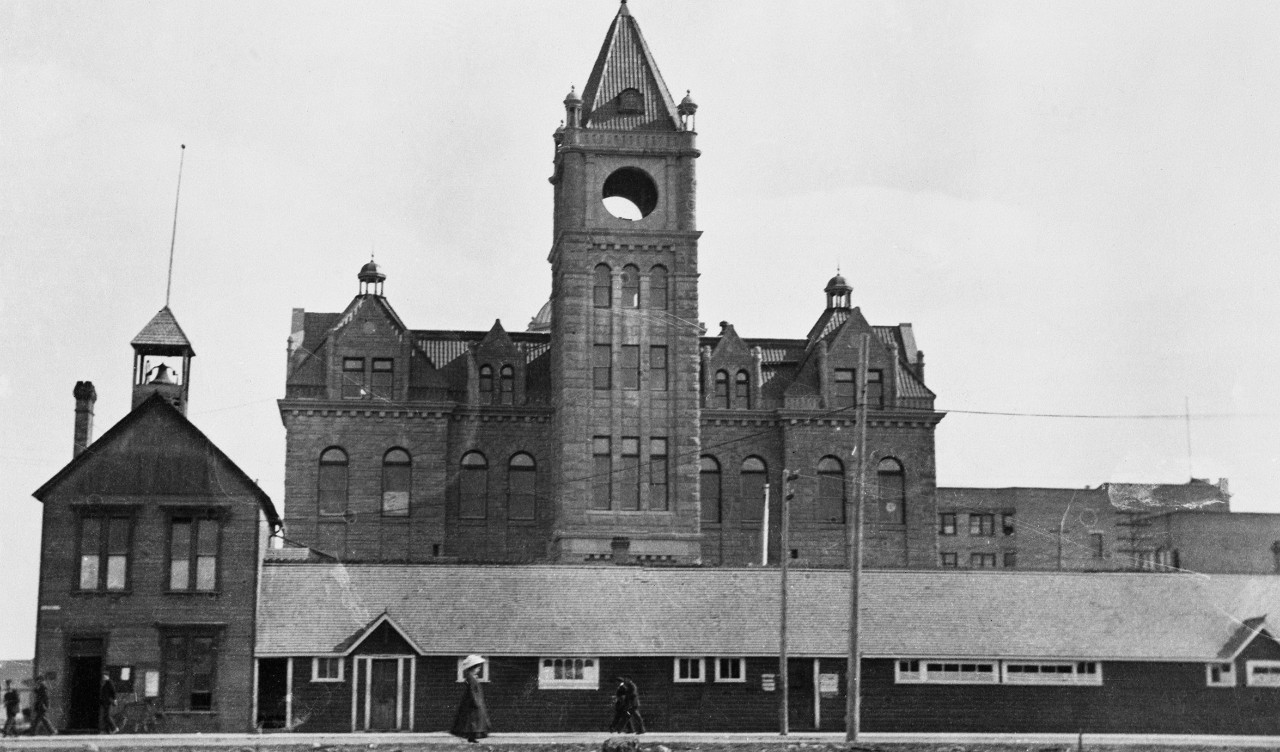
Calgary's original wooden Town Hall - built in 1885 - is dwarfed by the new City Hall being constructed right behind it in 1910

The four-storey building was constructed with a steel structural frame supporting the Paskapoo Sandstone exterior, which became a common building material in the city following the Calgary Fire of 1886, with the sandstone sourced from the Bone and Oliver Quarry. Construction itself was filled with controversy and delays. Costs for the building continued to rise, and in April 1909 residents rejected a plebiscite for a bylaw providing additional funds for construction. Following the bylaws failure, Dodd withheld payment to the primary contractor, the Alberta Building Company, which subsequently walked off the job. Shortly afterwards in January 1910, William Dodd's employment as architect was terminated, and he was replaced with local firm Hodgson & Bates. Construction resumed following approval of a bylaw for additional funds in Spring 1910. It is estimated the project cost a total of $300,000 by the time it was completed in 1911, approximately double the initial budget.

=== Time capsule ===
A sealed copper box was placed by Calgary's 10th Mayor Arthur Leslie Cameron and former mayors George Murdoch and George Clift King on September 14, 1908 in the building's cornerstone. Amongst the items in the time capsule, a copy of the New Testament, official copy of bylaws, voters' list, various reports of city departments, various medals of various departments, and a copy of the five newspapers circulating in the city. The time capsule was opened by Mayor Naheed Nenshi in November 2018 part of the restoration of the building.

=== Completion ===
The long awaited Calgary City Hall was opened by Conservative Member of Parliament and Leader of the Opposition Robert Borden on June 26, 1911. However, the City Hall building size would quickly become insufficient for the growing community, and by 1913, the building was already too small to house several civic services. Originally the structure served as the headquarters of the Calgary Police Service from 1911 to 1914, with 15 jail cells occupying a portion of the ground floor. Additionally, the building contained the city's court room which was conveniently located on the ground floor adjacent to the police department. When opened, a cannon was installed near the front entrance, which was replaced by a fountain. The site was landscaped with 210 palm trees; one of which survived until 1935.

=== Plaque ===
A plaque at the entrance is dedicated to the memory of Lieutenant-Colonel Russell Lambert Boyle and the 10th Battalion, CEF. Boyle was a Calgary area rancher who was killed during the 2nd Battle of Ypres while commanding the 10th Battalion, which was recruited from Calgary and Winnipeg.

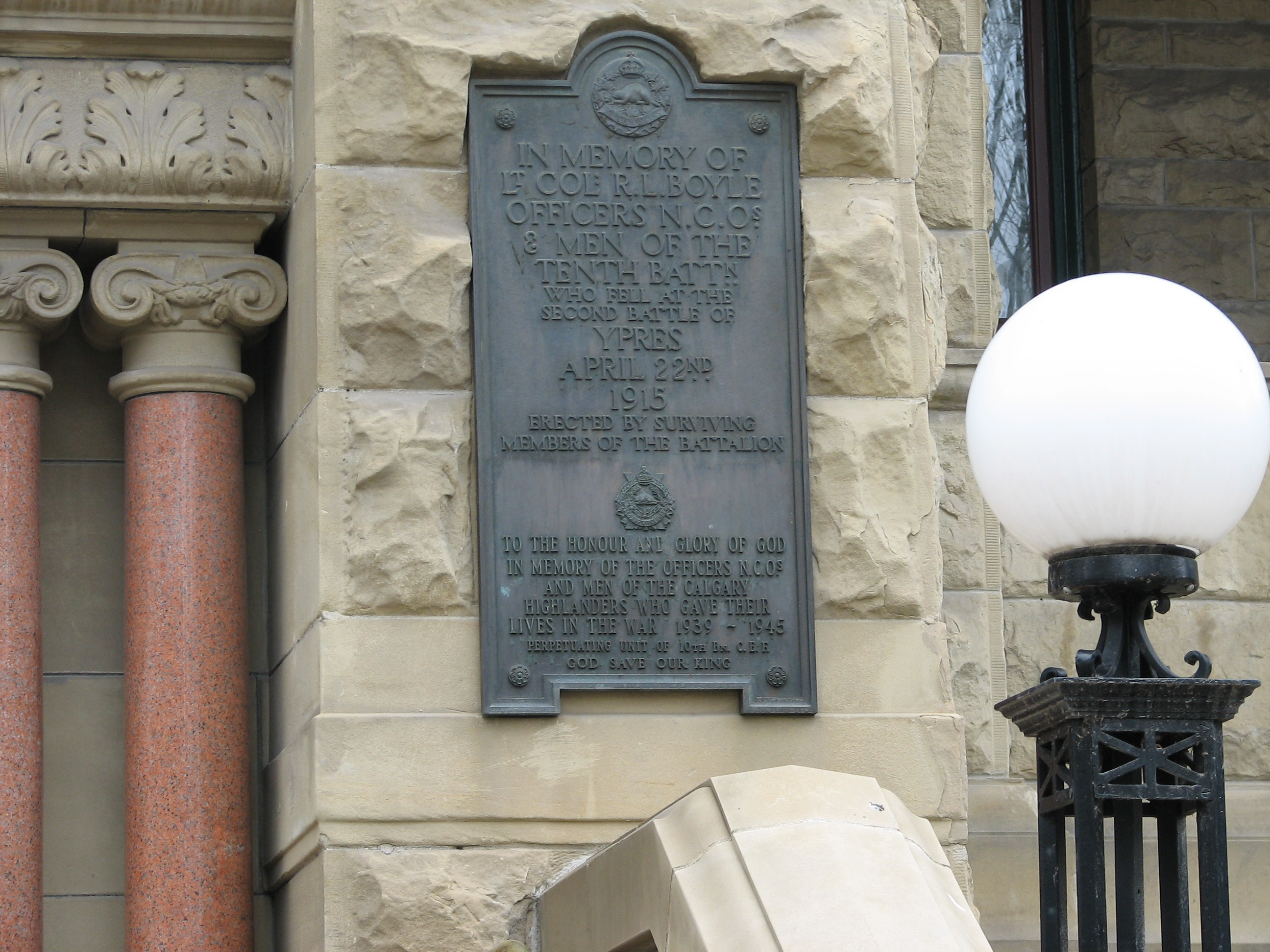
Plaque dedicated to the 10th Battalion, CEF and The Calgary Highlanders on the front of Calgary City Hall. Photographed 22 April 2007.

== Description ==
Calgary City Hall was designed by architect William M. Dodd to reflect Calgary's role as the urban centre in Southern Alberta. Dodd was known partnering with Edward Collis Hopkins to design Regina City Hall (which was demolished in 1965), along with his other designs in Calgary caught the attention of Calgary City Council. Dodd designed the building to embody Richardsonian Romanesque architectural style, with a symmetrical form with an elevated main floor, and includes a single clock tower with a Seth Thomas Clock installed, heavy stone exterior walls, bands of recessed windows, a recessed main entrance, stone arches and keystones above many windows and entries carved with the City's coat-of-arms. Notable interior elements include a highly ornamental cast-iron staircase and sky-lit rotundas.

== Historical site status ==
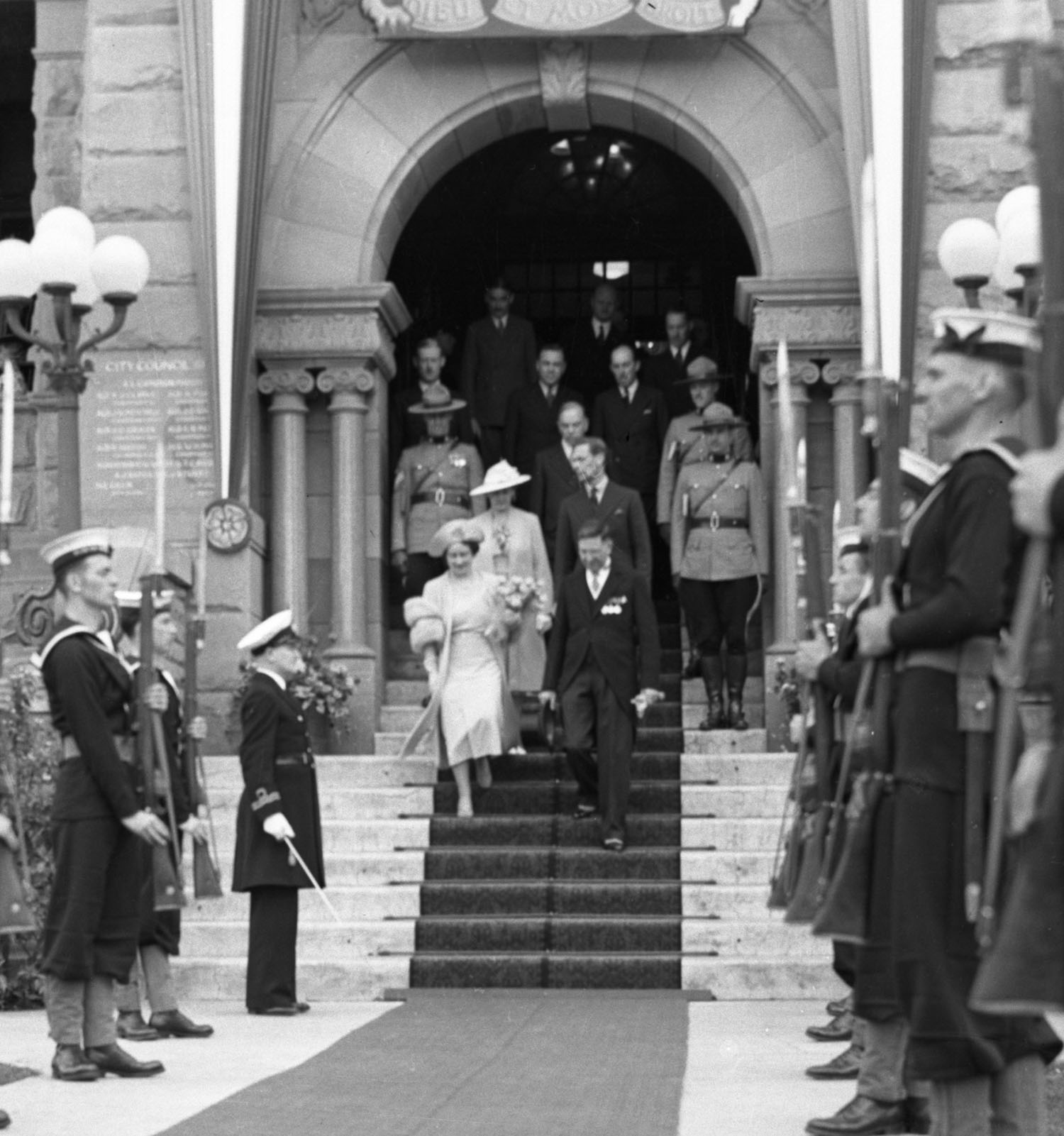
During the 1939 Royal Tour of Canada, Queen Elizabeth The Queen Mother is escorted down the stairs of Calgary City Hall by Mayor Andrew Davison. Prime Minister William Lyon Mackenzie King is following behind King George VI

On October 18, 1978, Calgary City Hall was designated as a Provincial Historical Resource, the designation notes the heritage value of old Calgary City Hall lies "with Calgary's historic status as the urban and economic centre of Southern Alberta, and its architectural significance as a monumental civic building."

On November 23, 1984, Calgary City Hall was designated a National Historic Site with the name "Calgary City Hall National Historic Site of Canada". The designation referenced the historic value of the site as the only surviving example of a pre-1930s civic hall in the prairie cities, and the prominence of the Romanesque Revival style and clock tower.

On April 17, 1990, the City of Calgary designated Calgary City Hall as the municipality's first Municipal Historic Resource under the Historical Resources Act.

== Current use ==
The building is still used as an active office space for the office of the Mayor, members of City Council, and the municipal Clerk. The meeting chambers for Calgary City Council, meeting rooms and city administration is housed in the adjacent Calgary Municipal Building.

=== Restoration ===
The quality, condition and cost of Calgary City Hall has been a civic debate since construction started in 1907, and the structure has undergone restoration a number of changes throughout its history. The first restoration occurred in 1962 at a cost of CA$2.5 million (equivalent to $25,817,610 in 2025) and addressed the interior and exterior of the building. The second restoration took place in the late 1990s with a cost of CA$9.3 million (equivalent to $16,437,675 in 2025).

In late 2014, Calgary City Council approved CA$34.1 million for renewal of Old Calgary City Hall. Protective scaffolding was installed outside the building in 2014, as pieces of the original Paskapoo sandstone began falling from the building. According to one source: "The work is so extensive that it would force city council and staff to leave the premises for up to four years." In 2020, the Calgary City Hall reopened after a restoration project lasting three years from the architecture firm Lemay and Evoq Architecture, in which 97% of the building’s sandstone was repaired by a combination of cleaning, structural repair, fortification and replacement.

== See also ==
- Calgary City Council
- List of National Historic Sites of Canada in Alberta
