= Olympic Plaza (Calgary) =

Park in Calgary, Alberta

Coordinates: 51.0459°N 114.0590°W

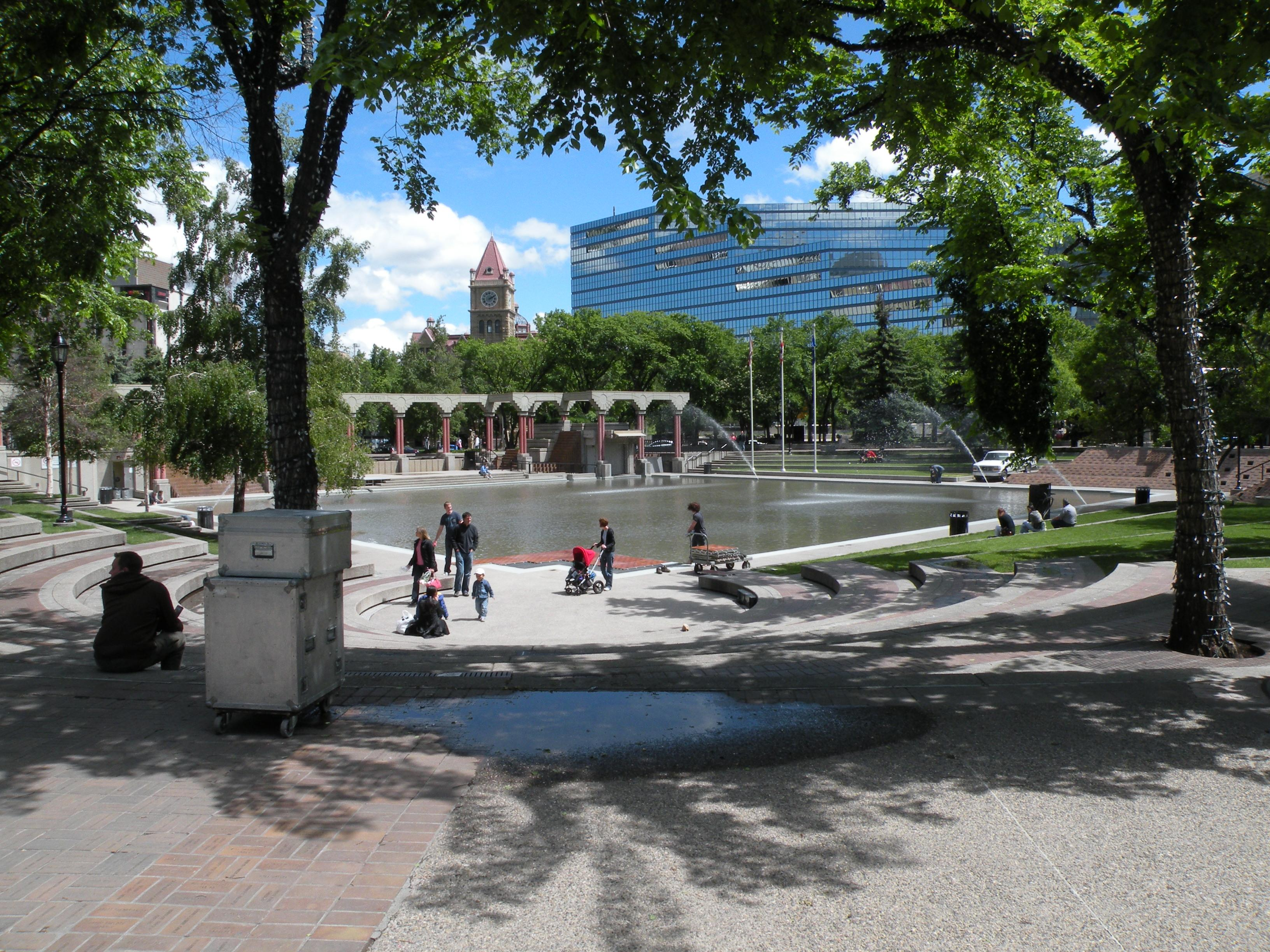

General information
- Location: Calgary, Alberta
- Named for: 1988 Winter Olympics
- Groundbreaking: 22 May 1986
- Opened: 31 July 1987
- Renovated: 2025

Design and construction
- Architects: M. Paul Friedberg; Gibbs Gage Partnership; Carson McCulloch Associates

Renovating team
- Architects: CCxA gh3* Belleville Placemaking

Olympic Plaza is an urban park and gathering place in downtown Calgary, Alberta, Canada. Located around Macleod Trail and 7 Avenue South, it was created as the venue for the medal ceremonies at the 1988 Winter Olympics. In 2004, over 30,000 people packed the plaza to celebrate the Calgary Flames' run to the 2004 Stanley Cup Finals.

== History ==
Olympic Plaza serves as a meeting place, and an outdoor event area, hosting concerts and festivals. In the winter, it is used as a public ice skating area. The plaza is accessible by Calgary's CTrain system at the City Hall station. As a fundraiser for the 1988 Winter Olympics, Calgarians were invited to purchase and personalize a brick to pave the plaza for $19.88. Prior to the plaza's demolition in 2025, the City of Calgary invited brick purchasers (or those close to them) to retrieve what bricks could be salvaged.

In January 1988, Globe and Mail architecture critic Adele Freedman reviewed the buildings constructed for the upcoming Olympics. Concerning Olympic Plaza she wrote:

The most alarming missed opportunity of them all is Olympic Plaza, a block-large public space smack in the middle of downtown, across from the glass hulk known as Calgary City Hall. It is on the plaza that medal presentations will take place. Paul Friedberg & Partners of New York, a landscape architecture firm, won a limited competition for the job, in association with the Gibbs Gage Partnership. The instant popularity of the plaza is proof it was desperately needed in a city centre choked with corporate towers. It can't have much to do with design. The plaza is a visual horror. The appointments of the plaza include a neon-striped colonnade, a cumbersome row of Egyptoid arches, and a massive, free-standing iron gate which has been bolted open. These may look suitably festive on television. But Calgarians will have to live with this vastly inferior rendition of Charles Moore's 10-year-old Piazza d'Italia long after Olympic banners have ceased to flutter.

Due to its location, directly across from Calgary City Hall and at the head of major pedestrian thoroughfare Stephen Avenue, the plaza is often the site of protests. The plaza has raised concerns with residents due to the large concentration of the homeless around the plaza, as well as a significant increase in violent crime and opioid overdoses. The plaza is currently undergoing renovations, with the original structures being demolished in January 2025, and the plaza set to reopen by 2028.
