= By-elections to the 28th Alberta Legislature =

By-elections to the 28th Alberta Legislature have been held to fill vacant seats in the Legislative Assembly of Alberta between the 2012 election and the 2015 election. Four by-elections were held to fill vacancies in the 28th Alberta Legislature, all in October 2014.

The by-elections were called by incoming premier Jim Prentice, who had been elected as the leader of the Alberta Progressive Conservatives on September 6, 2014. He subsequently appointed a new cabinet, which included two ministers who did not hold seats in the legislature. All four seats were open after the incumbent members resigned, and all resulted in holds for the Progressive Conservatives. One returned a Progressive Conservative member, when the incumbent was an independent, but he had been elected as a PC as well.

== Calgary-West ==
The riding of Calgary-West was vacated by incumbent MLA Ken Hughes in late September, 2014, after he failed to win the leadership contest for the Progressive Conservative Association of Alberta. The contest was instead won by Jim Prentice, who had been sworn in as premier earlier in that month.

The Progressive Conservative candidate, former police sergeant Mike Ellis won a narrow victory over Wildrose candidate Sheila Taylor. Taylor had resigned from the Calgary Public School Board in order to stand as a candidate in the by-election. This riding was one which the Wildrose expected to gain, given their dominance of the opinion polls under former premiers Dave Hancock and Alison Redford, but their candidate was defeated by a small margin. This result was consistent with province-wide opinion polling at the time, which saw a surge in support for the Progressive Conservatives under Prentice since he was elected as the party leader. Ellis was the only of the Progressive Conservative candidates to run that was not on the Executive Council of Alberta, the executive branch of Alberta's government. All other candidates were ministers, or in the case of Prentice, the premier.

The New Democrat candidate Brian Malkinson, who placed fourth in the 2014 Calgary-West by-election, went on to win the 2015 general election in the riding of Calgary-Currie less than a year later.

=== Calgary-West electoral result ===
Alberta provincial by-election, October 27, 2014: Calgary-West Resignation of Ken Hughes on September 26, 2014
Party	Candidate	Votes	%	±%
Progressive Conservative	Mike Ellis	4,836	44.29	−5.56
Wildrose	Sheila Taylor	4,530	41.58	+4.25
Liberal	David Khan	927	8.51	+1.05
New Democratic	Brian Malkinson	337	3.09	+0.08
Alberta Party	Troy Millington	264	2.42	+1.45
Total		10,894	—	—
Rejected, spoiled and declined		17	7	1
Eligible electors / turnout		30,541	35.73	—
Progressive Conservative hold		Swing		−
Source(s) Alberta. Chief Electoral Officer (2015). Report on the October 27, 2014 By-elections in: Calgary-Elbow, Calgary-Foothills, Calgary-West, Edmonton-Whitemud (PDF) (Report). Edmonton: Legislative Assembly of Alberta; Chief Electoral Officer. ISBN 978-098653678-6.

== Calgary-Foothills ==
The riding of Calgary-Foothills was previously held by independent MLA Len Webber since the 2004 election. He had previously served within the Progressive Conservative caucus, but sat as an independent in protest of incumbent premier Alison Redford's leadership. Webber resigned on September 29, 2014, in order to stand as a candidate for the Conservative Party of Canada in the 2015 federal election in the riding of Calgary Confederation, thus vacating the seat and allowing Jim Prentice to stand for election in that riding. This was the second of four ridings contested on the October 27th by-elections.

The campaign for Calgary-Foothills involved door-knocking by Prentice himself, as well as TV and radio advertisements relating to government policy and the changes that Prentice had implemented, fixing popular concerns with his predecessors. The turnout for the riding was projected to be high, and Prentice was the favoured candidate in the polls. Prentice had been installed as the Premier of Alberta after winning the leadership contest for the Progressive Conservative Association of Alberta earlier in September, 2014. The by-election was required for him to take a seat in the legislature, which is a convention of Westminster-style parliamentary democracy in which the government leader is a member of the legislature.

The by-election in Calgary-Foothills resulted in the election of Jim Prentice to the Legislative Assembly of Alberta. Prentice won with a majority of 3,367, and 58% of the popular vote.

=== Calgary-Foothills electoral result ===
Alberta provincial by-election, October 27, 2014: Calgary-Foothills Resignation of Len Webber on September 28, 2014
Party	Candidate	Votes	%	±%
Progressive Conservative	Jim Prentice	6,912	58.37	+4.71
Wildrose	Kathy Macdonald	3,545	29.94	-3.46
Liberal	Robert Prcic	458	3.87	-5.33
New Democratic	Jennifer Burgess	444	3.75	-0.01
Green	Polly Knowlton Cockett	248	2.09	—
Alberta Party	Michelle Glavine	212	1.79	—
Independent	Dave Woody Phillips	23	0.19	—
Total		11,842	—	—
Rejected, spoiled and declined		14	33	19
Eligible electors / turnout		32,743	36.27	—
Progressive Conservative hold		Swing		+4.72
Source(s) Alberta. Chief Electoral Officer (2015). Report on the October 27, 2014 By-elections in: Calgary-Elbow, Calgary-Foothills, Calgary-West, Edmonton-Whitemud (PDF) (Report). Edmonton: Legislative Assembly of Alberta; Chief Electoral Officer. ISBN 978-098653678-6.

== Edmonton-Whitemud ==
The riding of Edmonton-Whitemund had been previously held by Dave Hancock, the former Premier of Alberta who had been elevated to the role after the resignation of Alison Redford. He was the deputy leader of the Progressive Conservatives, and became the interim leader while the party held a leadership election. However, the office of the Premier cannot be assigned on an interim basis, so Hancock formed a government and then resigned once Prentice was selected as the next leader of the Progressive Conservatives.

Running in the riding for the Progressive Conservatives was Stephen Mandel, who had been appointed to Prentice's cabinet on September 15 and was required by Prentice to win his seat in order to keep his ministerial role. The riding was won by Mandel with 42% of the popular vote. This marked a ~18% decline from the 60% support that Hancock received in 2012.

=== Edmonton-Whitemund electoral result ===
Alberta provincial by-election, October 27, 2014: Edmonton-Whitemud Resignation of Dave Hancock on September 25, 2014
Party	Candidate	Votes	%	±%
Progressive Conservative	Stephen Mandel	6,003	42.39	-17.85
New Democratic	Bob Turner	3,150	22.24	13.24
Wildrose	Tim Grover	2,680	18.92	2.72
Liberal	Donna Wilson	2,033	14.35	2.39
Alberta Party	Will Munsey	202	1.43	-0.92
Green	René Malenfant	95	0.67	—
Total		14,163	—	—
Rejected, spoiled and declined		14	11	17
Eligible electors / turnout		35,795	39.36	-19.67
Progressive Conservative hold		Swing		-15.54
Source(s) Alberta. Chief Electoral Officer (2015). Report on the October 27, 2014 By-elections in: Calgary-Elbow, Calgary-Foothills, Calgary-West, Edmonton-Whitemud (PDF) (Report). Edmonton: Legislative Assembly of Alberta; Chief Electoral Officer. ISBN 978-098653678-6.

== Calgary-Elbow ==
The riding of Calgary-Elbow was vacated with the resignation of Alison Redford in the summer of 2014. She had stepped down as Premier some months earlier, to be replaced by Dave Hancock until a successor could be chosen through a leadership election for the Progressive Conservative Association of Alberta.

The riding was contested for the Progressive Conservatives by Gordon Dirks, who was the Minister of Education in the government of Jim Prentice. As with Mandel, he was required to win his seat in order to retain his post. Dirks won the riding over Alberta Party candidate and leader Greg Clark (Canadian politician) with a majority of 803. Clark would later defeat Dirks in the 2015 election.

=== Calgary-Elbow electoral result ===
Alberta provincial by-election, October 27, 2014: Calgary-Elbow
Party	Candidate	Votes	%	±%
Progressive Conservative	Gordon Dirks	4,209	33.22	-24.87
Alberta Party	Greg Clark	3,406	26.88	+24.20
Wildrose	John Fletcher	3,061	24.16	-4.42
Liberal	Susan Wright	1,523	12.02	+6.49
New Democratic	Stephanie McLean	471	3.72	-0.23
Total valid votes		12,670	100.00	–
Total rejected ballots		–	–	–
Turnout		––,–––	––.––	–
Eligible voters		––,–––	–	–
Progressive Conservative hold		Swing		-24.53

== See also ==
- List of Alberta by-elections for a list of all by-elections in Alberta, including tables of the incumbents and results.
