= Glamorgan, Calgary =

Glamorgan
- Neighbourhood
- Location of Glamorgan in Calgary
- Coordinates: 51°00′48″N 114°09′15″W
- Country: Canada
- Province: Alberta
- City: Calgary
- Quadrant: SW
- Ward: 6
- Established: 1958

Government
  - Mayor: Jeromy Farkas
  - Administrative body: Calgary City Council
  - Councillor: John Pantazopoulos (Independent)

Area
  - Total: 1.9 km^{2} (0.73 sq mi)
- Elevation: 1,140 m (3,740 ft)

Population (2006)
  - Total: 6,317
  - Average Income: $51,192
- Postal code: T3E
- Website: Glamorgan Community Association

Glamorgan is a residential neighbourhood in the southwest quadrant of Calgary, Alberta. It is bounded by Richmond Road to the north, by 37 Street W to the east, Glenmore Trail to the south and Sarcee Trail to the west.

Glamorgan was established in 1958. It is represented in the Calgary City Council by the Ward 6 councillor. Provincially, the community is part of the electoral district of Calgary-Elbow, represented by MLA Doug Schweitzer since the 2019 Alberta general election. Federally, it is part of the Calgary Signal Hill district, represented by MP Ron Liepert since the 2015 Canadian federal election.

== Demographics ==
In the City of Calgary's 2012 municipal census, Glamorgan had a population of 6,376 living in 2,988 dwellings, a 2.1% increase from its 2011 population of 6,242. With a land area of 2 km^{2} (0.77 sq mi), it had a population density of 3,200/km^{2} (8,300/sq mi) in 2012.

Residents in this community had a median household income of $51,192 in 2000, and there were 55.9% low income residents living in the neighbourhood. As of 2000, 15.9% of the residents were immigrants. A proportion of 30.8% of the buildings were condominiums or apartments, and 37.1% of the housing was used for renting.

== Education ==
The community is served by Glamorgan Elementary public school and St. Andrew Elementary School (Catholic).

== See also ==
- List of neighbourhoods in Calgary
