= Calgary-Elbow =

Provincial electoral district in Alberta, Canada

Coordinates: 51.02°N 114.08°W

Alberta electoral district
- Calgary-Elbow within the City of Calgary, 2017 boundaries

Provincial electoral district
- Legislature: Legislative Assembly of Alberta
MLA
Samir Kayande
New Democratic
- District created: 1971
- First contested: 1971
- Last contested: 2023

Calgary-Elbow is a provincial electoral district for the Legislative Assembly of Alberta, Canada. The seat is held by NDP MLA Samir Kayande, who won the seat in the 2023 provincial election

The riding was created in 1971 from the southeast part of Calgary-Glenmore and the southwest part of the old Calgary South riding.

It includes the following communities: Altadore, Bel-Aire, Britannia, Elbow Park, Elboya, Erlton, Garrison Woods, Glamorgan, Lincoln Park, Mount Royal, Marda Loop, Mayfair, Meadowlark Park, North Glenmore, Parkhill, Rideau Park, Roxboro, South Calgary, and Windsor Park.

The NDP won the seat for the first time at the 2023 Alberta general election.

== History ==
The electoral district was created in the 1971 boundary redistribution out of the electoral districts of Calgary Glenmore, Calgary South, and Calgary Victoria Park.

The 2010 boundary redistribution saw significant changes to the riding. All territory south of Glenmore Trail was moved to Calgary-Glenmore and the northern boundary shifted, exchanging and losing many different portions of the riding with Calgary-Currie and Calgary-Buffalo.

=== Boundary history ===
8 Calgary-Elbow 2003 boundaries
Bordering districts
North	East	West	South
Calgary-Buffalo, Calgary-Currie and Calgary-West	Calgary-Egmont	Calgary-West and Foothills-Rocky View	Calgary-Glenmore
riding map goes here			
Legal description from the Statutes of Alberta 2003, Electoral Divisions Act.
Starting at the intersection of Sarcee Trail SW and Richmond Road SW; then 1. northeast along Richmond Road SW to Crowchild Trail SW; 2. south along Crowchild Trail SW to 50 Avenue SW; 3. east along 50 Avenue SW and its easterly extension to the left bank of the Elbow River; 4. generally northwest and north along the left bank of the lbow River to the south easterly extension of the southwest boundary of Block 4, Plan 8035 AG; 5. northwesterly along the extension and the west boundary of Block 4, Plan 8035 AG to its northerly extension with 38 Avenue SW; 6. west along 38 Avenue SW to 14 Street SW; 7. north along 14 Street SW to Council Way SW; 8. northeast along Council Way SW to 10 Street SW; 9. north along 10 Street SW to Premier Way SW; 10. northeasterly along Premier Way SW to 30 Avenue SW; 11. east along 30 Avenue SW to 7 Street SW; 12. north along 7 Street SW to 29 Avenue SW; 13. east along 29 Avenue SW and its extension to the left bank of the Elbow River; 14. generally northeast along the left bank of the Elbow River to Macleod Trail S; 15. south along Macleod Trail S to Glenmore Trail SW; 16. west along Glenmore Trail SW to Elbow Drive SW; 17. south along Elbow Drive SW to Heritage Drive SW; 18. west along Heritage Drive SW and its westerly extension to the east shore of Glenmore Reservoir; 19. in a generally westerly and northerly direction along the east shore of Glenmore Reservoir to Glenmore Trail SW; 20. northwest along Glenmore Trail SW to the west shore of Glenmore Reservoir; 21. in a generally southwesterly and northwesterly direction along the west shore of Glenmore Reservoir to the east boundary of Sec. 25, Twp. 23, Rge. 2 W5; 22. north along the east boundary of Sec. 25 to the west city boundary (near 66 Avenue SW); 23. north and west along the west city boundary to a southerly extension of the Sarcee Trail SW; 24. north along the extension and the Sarcee Trail SW to the starting point.
Note:

9 Calgary-Elbow 2010 boundaries
Bordering districts
North	East	West	South
Calgary-Buffalo and Calgary-Currie	Calgary-Acadia	Calgary-West	Calgary-Glenmore and Chestermere-Rocky View
Note: Boundary descriptions were not used in the 2010 redistribution

=== Representation history ===
Calgary-Elbow
Assembly	Years	Member	Party
Riding created from Calgary Glenmore, Calgary South and Calgary Victoria Park
17th	1971–1975	David Russell	Progressive Conservative
18th	1975–1979	David Russell	Progressive Conservative
19th	1979–1982	David Russell	Progressive Conservative
20th	1982–1986	David Russell	Progressive Conservative
21st	1986–1989	David Russell	Progressive Conservative
22nd	1989–1993	Ralph Klein	Progressive Conservative
23rd	1993–1997	Ralph Klein	Progressive Conservative
24th	1997–2001	Ralph Klein	Progressive Conservative
25th	2001–2004	Ralph Klein	Progressive Conservative
26th	2004–2007	Ralph Klein	Progressive Conservative
26th	2007–2008	Craig Cheffins	Liberal
27th	2008–2012	Alison Redford	Progressive Conservative
28th	2012–2014	Alison Redford	Progressive Conservative
28th	2014–2015	Gordon Dirks	Progressive Conservative
29th	2015–2019	Greg Clark	Alberta Party
30th	2019–2022	Doug Schweitzer	United Conservative
31st	2023–Present	Samir Kayande	New Democratic

The electoral district of Calgary-Elbow was created in the boundary redistribution of 1971 from Calgary Glenmore, Calgary South and Calgary Victoria Park. The first election saw architect and former Calgary Victoria Park Progressive Conservative incumbent and Calgary Alderman David Russell run for re-election. He won a hotly contested race over Social Credit candidate L.A. “Chick” Thorssen to pick up the new district for his party.

Upon being elected Russell was appointed into the cabinet of Premier Peter Lougheed. He ran for re-election in 1975 and defeated future Senator Sharon Carstairs in a landslide victory. He would be re-elected with large majorities three more times while continuing to serve in various cabinet portfolios. He would be appointed Deputy Premier by Don Getty in 1985. Russell retired from the legislature in 1989.

The second representative in the riding was former Mayor of Calgary Ralph Klein who, following a party nomination win over business-person Fran Drummond, was elected to his first term in 1989. Klein would win the leadership of the Progressive Conservatives in 1992 and become Premier of the province. He would hold the premiership until December 2006 before resigning his seat in 2007. In total, Klein was re-elected in the Elbow electoral district four times.

A by-election was held on June 12, 2007. The winner was Alberta Liberal candidate Craig Cheffins who managed an upset win over well-known local business person Brian Heninger.

The 2008 general election saw Cheffins defeated as Progressive Conservative candidate Alison Redford won back the riding for her party. She was promoted to cabinet by Premier Ed Stelmach following the election.

Redford became Premier of Alberta and leader of the Progressive Conservative party after winning the 2011 Progressive Conservative leadership race. She was re-elected in the 2012 provincial election, but stepped down in 2014 following significant internal party unrest about her leadership.

Calgary-Elbow was one of four provincial seats won by the Progressive Conservatives in the 2014 Alberta by-elections. Former Calgary school board chair and Saskatchewan MLA Gordon Dirks took Calgary-Elbow in this by-election.

In the 2015 provincial election Greg Clark, the leader of the Alberta Party, was elected MLA, defeating incumbent MLA and Education minister Gordon Dirks. While Clark had a modest showing in the 2012 election, his strong local connections gave him healthy numbers in the 2014 by-election and foreshadowed his 2015 win. Clark led the Alberta Party between 2013 and 2017, stepping down as leader prior to the 2019 general election.

A general election was called in April 2019, with recently nominated United Conservative Party representative Doug Schweitzer defeating Greg Clark. Schweitzer was named to cabinet of the governing Jason Kenney led UCP, first as Justice Minister and later as Minister of Jobs, Economy and Innovation. In a series of announcements, Schweitzer in May, 2022 stated he would not seek re-election in 2023, subsequently resigning from cabinet and finally stepping down as MLA on August 31, 2022, leaving the riding vacant. With some uncertainty in the legislation governing the timing of provincial by-elections, Premier Jason Kenney side-stepped the issue confirming he would leave the matter of a possible by-election to his successor, following the UCP leadership vote on October 6, 2022.

== Legislative election results ==
=== Graphical summary ===
1971
6.42%	51.77%	41.81%
NDP	Progressive Conservative	Social Credit

1975
5.38%	13.77%	73.79%	7.06%
NDP	Liberal	Progressive Conservative	SC

1979
5.89%	13.6%	65.86%	14.65%
NDP	Liberal	Progressive Conservative	Social Credit

1982
9.79%	6.26%	4.83%	69.83%	1.59%	7.7%
NDP	Liberal	Ind.	Progressive Conservative	SC	WCC

1986
16.21%	18.37%	65.42%
NDP	Liberal	Progressive Conservative

1989
7.92%	40.55%	49.61%
NDP	Liberal	Progressive Conservative

1993
35.47%	58.1%
Liberal	Progressive Conservative

1997
36.5%	57.86%	3%
Liberal	Progressive Conservative	SC

2001
2.41%	29.66%	66.84%
NDP	Liberal	Progressive Conservative

2004
5%	36.53%	51.48%
Green	Liberal	Progressive Conservative

2007 by-election
5.6%	45.77%	38.33%
Green	Liberal	Progressive Conservative

2008
39.2%	42.08%	6.6%
Liberal	Progressive Conservative	Wildrose

2012
58.09%	28.58%
Progressive Conservative	Wildrose

2014 by-election
12.02%	26.88%	33.22%	24.16%
Liberal	Alberta Party	Progressive Conservative	Wildrose

2015
15.78%	42.2%	30.31%	8.7%
NDP	Alberta Party	Progressive Conservative	Wildrose

2019
23.5%	30.5%	44.3%
NDP	Alberta Party	United Conservative

2023
49.0%	4.6%	46.0%
NDP	Alberta Party	United Conservative

=== 2023 ===
2023 Alberta general election
Party	Candidate	Votes	%	±%
New Democratic	Samir Kayande	12,189	49.01	+25.54
United Conservative	Chris Davis	11,446	46.02	+1.68
Alberta Party	Kerry Cundal	1,136	4.57	-25.97
Solidarity Movement	Artur Pawlowski	99	0.40	–
Total		24,870	99.12	–
Rejected and declined		220	0.88	
Turnout		25,090	68.77	
Eligible voters		36,483		
New Democratic gain from United Conservative		Swing		+11.93
Source(s) Source: Elections Alberta

=== 2019 ===
2019 Alberta general election
Party	Candidate	Votes	%	±%	Expenditures
United Conservative	Doug Schweitzer	10,951	44.34	+5.03	$309,597
Alberta Party	Greg Clark	7,542	30.54	-9.73	$70,288
New Democratic	Janet Eremenko	5,796	23.47	+7.17	$44,092
Liberal	Robin Mackintosh	275	1.11	-2.61	$500
Green	Quinn Rupert	132	0.53	+0.45	$500
Total		24,696	98.36	–	
Rejected, spoiled and declined		413	1.64		
Turnout		25,109	71.88		
Eligible voters		34,934			
United Conservative gain from Alberta Party		Swing		+7.38	
Source(s) Source: Elections Alberta Note: Expenses is the sum of "Election Expenses", "Other Expenses" and "Transfers Issued". The Elections Act limits "Election Expenses" to $50,000.

=== 2015 ===
2015 Alberta general election
Party	Candidate	Votes	%	±%
Alberta Party	Greg Clark	8,707	42.20%	15.32%
Progressive Conservative	Gordon Edwin Dirks	6,254	30.31%	-2.91%
New Democratic	Catherine Welburn	3,256	15.78%	12.06%
Wildrose	Megan Brown	1,786	8.66%	-15.50%
Liberal	John Roggeveen	565	2.74%	-9.28%
Social Credit	Larry R. Heather	67	0.32%	–
Total		20,635	–	–
Rejected, spoiled and declined		43	43	15
Eligible electors / turnout		34,681	59.67%	22.51%
Alberta Party gain from Progressive Conservative		Swing		-8.81%
Source(s) Source: "09 - Calgary-Elbow, 2015 Alberta general election". officialresults.elections.ab.ca. Elections Alberta. Chief Electoral Officer (2016). 2015 General Election. A Report of the Chief Electoral Officer (PDF) (Report). Edmonton, Alta.: Elections Alberta. pp. 121–124.

2015 Alberta general election redistributed results
Party	Votes	%
Alberta Party	8,372	40.27
Progressive Conservative	6,384	30.71
New Democratic	3,389	16.30
Wildrose	1,788	8.60
Liberal	775	3.73
Social Credit	64	0.31
Green	17	0.08
Source(s) Source: Ridingbuilder

=== 2014 by-election ===
Alberta provincial by-election, October 27, 2014 Resignation of Alison Redford on August 6, 2014
Party	Candidate	Votes	%	±%
Progressive Conservative	Gordon Dirks	4,209	33.22	-24.87
Alberta Party	Greg Clark	3,406	26.88	+24.20
Wildrose	John Fletcher	3,061	24.16	-4.42
Liberal	Susan Wright	1,523	12.02	+6.49
New Democratic	Stephanie McLean	471	3.72	-0.23
Total		12,842	—	—
Rejected, spoiled and declined		23	22	2
Eligible electors / turnout		34,163	37.16	—
Progressive Conservative hold		Swing		-24.53
Source(s) Alberta. Chief Electoral Officer (2015). Report on the October 27, 2014 By-elections in: Calgary-Elbow, Calgary-Foothills, Calgary-West, Edmonton-Whitemud (PDF) (Report). Edmonton: Legislative Assembly of Alberta; Chief Electoral Officer. ISBN 978-098653678-6.

=== 2012 ===
2012 Alberta general election
Party	Candidate	Votes	%	±%
Progressive Conservative	Alison Redford	11,198	58.09	+16.01
Wildrose	James Cole	5,509	28.58	+21.97
Liberal	Beena Ashar	1,067	5.53	−33.67
New Democratic	Craig Coolahan	761	3.95	+1.96
Alberta Party	Greg Clark	518	2.69	–
Evergreen	William Hamilton	225	1.17	−2.44
Total valid votes		19,278	100.00	–
Total rejected ballots		257	–	–
Turnout		19,535	58.44	+12.60
Eligible voters		33,430	–	–

=== 2008 ===
2008 Alberta general election
Party	Candidate	Votes	%	±%
Progressive Conservative	Alison Redford	6,130	42.08	+3.75
Liberal	Craig Cheffins	5,711	39.20	−6.57
Wildrose Alliance	Dale Nelson	963	6.61	+2.44
Independent	Barry Erskine	948	6.51	
Green	Jonathon Sheffield	526	3.61	−1.99
New Democratic	Garnet Wilcox	290	1.99	−1.31
Total valid votes		14,568	100.00	
Total rejected ballots		77		
Turnout		14,645	45.84	
Eligible voters		31,947		
Progressive Conservative gain from Liberal		Swing		+5.16%

=== 2007 by-election ===
Alberta provincial by-election, June 12, 2007 Resignation of Ralph Klein on January 15, 2007
Party	Candidate	Votes	%	±%
Liberal	Craig Cheffins	4,823	45.77	+9.24
Progressive Conservative	Brian Heninger	4,039	38.33	−13.15
Green	George Read	590	5.60	+0.66
Alberta Alliance	Jane Morgan	439	4.17	+0.56
New Democratic	Al Brown	348	3.30	+0.75
Social Credit	Trevor Grover	175	1.66	+1.15
Independent	Jeff Willerton	124	1.17	—
Total valid votes		10,538	—	—
Rejected, spoiled and declined		13	25	3
Eligible electors / turnout		30,538	34.64	—
Liberal gain from Progressive Conservative		Swing		+11.20
Source(s) Alberta. Chief Electoral Officer (2007). Report on the June 12, 2007 By-elections: Calgary-Elbow & Drumheller-Stettler (Report). Edmonton: Legislative Assembly of Alberta; Chief Electoral Officer.

=== 2004 ===
2004 Alberta general election
Party	Candidate	Votes	%	±%
Progressive Conservative	Ralph Klein	6,958	51.48	-15.36
Liberal	Stephen Brown	4,938	36.53	+6.87
Green	Alison Roth	668	4.94	–
Alberta Alliance	Diana-Lynn Brooks	488	3.61	–
New Democratic	Becky Kelly	345	2.55	+0.14
Social Credit	Trevor Grover	69	0.51	–
Independent	Lloyd Blimke	51	0.38	–
Total valid votes		13,517	100.00	–
Total rejected ballots		142	–	–
Turnout		13,659	52.60	–
Eligible voters		25,968	–	–
Progressive Conservative hold		Swing		-11.12

=== 2001 ===
2001 Alberta general election
Party	Candidate	Votes	%	±%
Progressive Conservative	Ralph Klein	10,213	66.84	+8.98
Liberal	Harold Swanson	4,533	29.66	-6.83
New Democratic	Mathew Zachariah	369	2.41	+0.25
Independent	Monier Rahall	166	1.09	–
Total valid votes		15,281	100.00	–
Total rejected ballots		73	–	–
Turnout		15,354	61.95	–
Eligible voters		24,786	–	–
Progressive Conservative hold		Swing		+7.91

=== 1997 ===
1997 Alberta general election
Party	Candidate	Votes	%	±%
Progressive Conservative	Ralph Klein	8,237	57.86	-0.24
Liberal	Harold Swanson	5,195	36.49	+1.02
Social Credit	Lera Shirley	421	2.96	+1.16
New Democratic	Shawn Christie	307	2.16	-1.40
Natural Law	Frank Haika	75	0.53	+0.04
Total valid votes		14,235	100.00	–
Total rejected ballots		48	–	–
Turnout		14,283	60.34	–
Eligible voters		23,626	–	–
Progressive Conservative hold		Swing		-0.63

=== 1993 ===
1993 Alberta general election
Party	Candidate	Votes	%	±%
Progressive Conservative	Ralph Klein	10,061	58.10	+8.49
Liberal	Madeleine King	6,142	35.47	-5.08
New Democratic	Eileen Teslenko	617	3.56	-4.36
Social Credit	Steve Tobler	312	1.80	–
Independent	Miel Gabriel	101	0.58	–
Natural Law	Bruce Hansen	85	0.49	–
Total valid votes		17,318	100.00	–
Total rejected ballots		48	–	–
Turnout		17,366	67.10	–
Eligible voters		25,873	–	–
Progressive Conservative hold		Swing		+6.79

=== 1989 ===
1989 Alberta general election
Party	Candidate	Votes	%	±%
Progressive Conservative	Ralph Klein	4,505	49.61	-15.81
Liberal	Gilbert Clark	3,682	40.55	+22.18
New Democratic	David Jones	719	7.92	-8.29
Independent	Larry Heather	174	1.92	–
Total valid votes		9,080	100.00	–
Total rejected ballots		17	–	–
Turnout		9,097	51.12	–
Eligible voters		17,794	–	–
Progressive Conservative hold		Swing		-18.96

=== 1986 ===
1986 Alberta general election
Party	Candidate	Votes	%	±%
Progressive Conservative	David Russell	4,515	65.42	-4.41
Liberal	Frank Wishlow	1,268	18.37	+12.11
New Democratic	Susan Liddy	1,119	16.21	+6.42
Total valid votes		6,902	100.00	–
Total rejected ballots		27	–	–
Turnout		6,929	39.77	–
Eligible voters		17,422	–	–
Progressive Conservative hold		Swing		-8.26

=== 1982 ===
1982 Alberta general election
Party	Candidate	Votes	%	±%
Progressive Conservative	David Russell	7,521	69.83	+3.97
New Democratic	Thora Miessner	1,054	9.79	+3.90
Western Canada Concept	Gregory Langen	829	7.70	–
Liberal	John Webb	674	6.26	-7.34
Independent	Don Carter	520	4.83	–
Social Credit	Raymond Neilson	172	1.59	-13.06
Total valid votes		10,770	100.00	–
Total rejected ballots		30	–	–
Turnout		10,800	60.81	–
Eligible voters		17,761	–	–
Progressive Conservative hold		Swing		+3.94

=== 1979 ===
1979 Alberta general election
Party	Candidate	Votes	%	±%
Progressive Conservative	David Russell	5,941	65.86	-7.93
Social Credit	Patricia Sveen	1,321	14.65	+7.59
Liberal	John Webb	1,227	13.60	-0.17
New Democratic	William Oxendale	531	5.89	+0.51
Total valid votes		9,020	100.00	–
Total rejected ballots		27	–	–
Turnout		9,047	52.16	–
Eligible voters		17,345	–	–
Progressive Conservative hold		Swing		-7.76

=== 1975 ===
1975 Alberta general election
Party	Candidate	Votes	%	±%
Progressive Conservative	David Russell	6,159	73.79	+22.02
Liberal	Sharon Carstairs	1,149	13.77	–
Social Credit	Bernard Laing	589	7.06	-34.75
New Democratic	Jack Peters	449	5.38	-1.04
Total valid votes		8,346	100.00	–
Total rejected ballots		13	–	–
Turnout		8,359	61.11	–
Eligible voters		13,679	–	–
Progressive Conservative hold		Swing		+28.39

=== 1971 ===
1971 Alberta general election
Party	Candidate	Votes	%
Progressive Conservative	David Russell	5,547	51.77
Social Credit	L.A. Thorssen	4,480	41.81
New Democratic	Dolores LeDrew	688	6.42
Total valid votes		10,715	100.00
Total rejected ballots		47	–
Turnout		10,762	73.68
Eligible voters		14,606	–

== Senate nominee election results ==
=== 2004 ===
2004 Senate nominee election results: Calgary-Elbow				Turnout 52.80%
Affiliation	Candidate	Votes	% ballots	Rank
Progressive Conservative	Bert Brown	5,751	54.51%	1
Progressive Conservative	Jim Silye	5,181	49.10%	5
Progressive Conservative	Betty Unger	4,173	39.55%	2
Independent	Link Byfield	3,175	30.09%	4
Progressive Conservative	David Usherwood	2,826	26.78%	6
Progressive Conservative	Cliff Breitkreuz	2,437	23.10%	3
Independent	Tom Sindlinger	2,172	20.59%	9
Alberta Alliance	Vance Gough	1,707	16.18%	8
Alberta Alliance	Michael Roth	1,556	14.75%	7
Alberta Alliance	Gary Horan	1,385	14.75%	10
Total ballots		10,551	100%	
Rejected, spoiled and declined		3,161		
25,968 eligible electors

Voters had the option of selecting four candidates on the ballot

== Nomination contests ==
UCP Calgary-Elbow nomination contest: December 3, 2022

Candidate
Candidate	Votes	%
Chris Davis	360	50.4
Cornelia Wiebe	273	38.2
Andrea James	81	11.3
Total	714	100.0

== See also ==
- List of Alberta provincial electoral districts
- Canadian provincial electoral districts
