= Samir Kayande =

Canadian politician from Alberta

Samir Kayande MLA
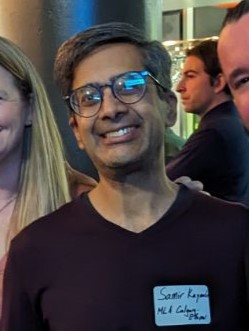
- Kayande in 2023

Member of the Legislative Assembly of Alberta for Calgary-Elbow
- Incumbent
- Assumed office May 29, 2023
- Preceded by: Doug Schweitzer

Personal details
- Born: January 24, 1972 (age 54) Fort McMurray, Alberta
- Party: Alberta New Democratic Party
- Education: University of Alberta; Carnegie-Mellon University
- Occupation: Politician, engineer, business consultant, energy analyst, and executive

Samir Kayande is a Canadian politician from the Alberta New Democratic Party who was elected as a Member of the Legislative Assembly of Alberta for Calgary-Elbow in the 2023 Alberta general election. It was the first time the seat had been won by the NDP. He formerly worked as an energy analyst and strategy consultant. As of June 21, 2024, he serves as the Official Opposition critic for Finance (Fiscal Responsibility).

== Life and career ==
He has a Bachelor of Science in Chemical Engineering from the University of Alberta, and an MBA from the Tepper School of Business at Carnegie-Mellon University.

Before entering politics, Kayande was an engineer, business consultant, energy analyst, and executive. He specialized in the economic analysis of capital assets, including nuclear power plants, wind farms, solar energy, oil sands facilities, and pipelines. In addition, he built software tools that helped institutional investors make investment decisions.

Kayande served on the board of the Pembina Institute from 2021 to 2022.

Kayande is married with two children.

== Electoral history ==
2023 Alberta general election: Calgary-Elbow
| Party | Candidate | Votes | % | ±% |
|---|---|---|---|---|
| New Democratic | Samir Kayande | 12,189 | 49.01 | +25.54 |
| United Conservative | Chris Davis | 11,446 | 46.02 | +1.68 |
| Alberta Party | Kerry Cundal | 1,136 | 4.57 | -25.97 |
| Solidarity Movement | Artur Pawlowski | 99 | 0.40 | – |
| Total | | 24,870 | 99.12 | – |
| Rejected and declined | | 220 | 0.88 | |
| Turnout | | 25,090 | 68.77 | |
| Eligible voters | | 36,483 | | |
| New Democratic gain from United Conservative | | Swing | | +11.93 |
Source(s) Source: Elections Alberta
