= Ralph Klein =

Premier of Alberta from 1992 to 2006

The Honourable Ralph Klein OC AOE
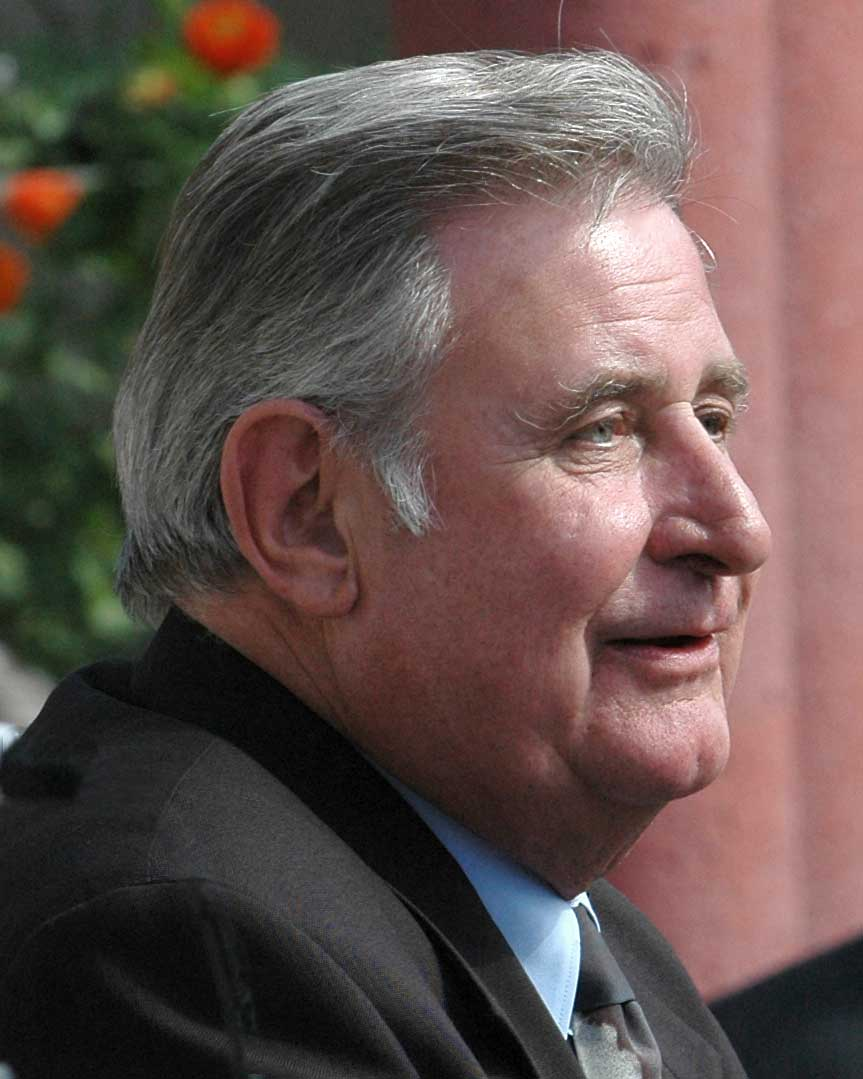
- Klein in 2005

12th Premier of Alberta
- In office December 14, 1992 – December 14, 2006
- Monarch: Elizabeth II
- Lieutenant Governor: Gordon Towers; Bud Olson; Lois Hole; Norman Kwong
- Deputy: Ken Kowalski; Shirley McClellan
- Preceded by: Don Getty
- Succeeded by: Ed Stelmach

Leader of the Progressive Conservative Association of Alberta
- In office November 28, 1992 – November 25, 2006
- Preceded by: Don Getty
- Succeeded by: Ed Stelmach

32nd Mayor of Calgary
- In office October 27, 1980 – March 21, 1989
- Preceded by: Ross Alger
- Succeeded by: Donald Adam Hartman
Alberta Executive Council
Minister of Federal and Intergovernmental Affairs
In office June 30, 1993 – September 15, 1994
Premier	Himself
Preceded by	Peter Elzinga
Succeeded by	Ken Rostad
Minister of the Environment
In office April 14, 1989 – December 14, 1992
Premier	Don Getty
Preceded by	Ian Reid
Succeeded by	Brian Evans
Parliamentary constituencies
Member of the Legislative Assembly of Alberta for Calgary-Elbow
In office March 20, 1989 – January 15, 2007
Preceded by	David John Russell
Succeeded by	Craig Cheffins

Personal details
- Born: Ralph Phillip Klein; November 1, 1942 Calgary, Alberta, Canada
- Died: March 29, 2013 (aged 70) Calgary, Alberta, Canada
- Party: Progressive Conservative
- Spouses: Hilda Hepner (m. 1961; div. 1971); Colleen Hamilton (m. 1972)
- Children: 3 (and 2 stepchildren)
- Education: Athabasca University
- Profession: Journalist

Military service
- Allegiance: Canada
- Branch/service: Royal Canadian Air Force
- Unit: Primary Reserve

Ralph Philip Klein OC AOE (November 1, 1942 – March 29, 2013) was a Canadian politician and journalist who served as the 12th premier of Alberta and leader of the Progressive Conservative Association of Alberta from 1992 until his retirement in 2006. Klein also served as the 32nd mayor of Calgary from 1980 to 1989.

Ralph was born and mostly grew up in Calgary, Alberta. After dropping out of High School in grade 11, Klein joined the Royal Canadian Air Force reserves for one year and then attended the Calgary Business College. Klein later worked as a teacher and principal at the Calgary Business College, and later public relations with non-profits. After that, Klein became a prominent local journalist in Calgary where he reported on the challenges of the working class, social outcasts and First Nations, endearing himself to those groups. In 1980, Klein turned his attention to politics and as an underdog was elected Mayor of Calgary, where he oversaw the boom and bust of the oil industry in the 1980s, expansion of the CTrain, and the 1988 Winter Olympic Games. Klein resigned as Mayor in 1989 and turned his attention to provincial politics where he served as Environment Minister in the Cabinet of Don Getty for four years.

In 1992, Klein was elected as leader of the Progressive Conservative Association of Alberta and went on to lead the party to a majority government in the 1993 Alberta general election; Klein continued the Progressive Conservative dynasty and won three more majority governments afterwards. Klein's informal style endeared him to Albertans early in his term, and his political longevity and centralized management style earned him the nickname "King Ralph". As premier, Klein oversaw a short period of drastic cuts to the public service and privatization of government services; this fiscal strategy ended in the late 1990s as rising oil and gas prices increased provincial tax revenues resulting in spending increases and paying down of the provincial government debt. Klein's 14-year-long tenure as premier ended when the Alberta Progressive Conservatives' new leader, Ed Stelmach, assumed office on December 14, 2006.

== Early years ==
Klein was born in Calgary, to Philip Andrew Klein (1917–2014) and Florence Jeanette Harper (1924–2004). His paternal grandparents were immigrants, from Germany and England, respectively. His father, Phil, was born in Rocky Mountain House, Alberta, grew up poor and rode the rails during the Great Depression in search of work. In the early 1940s he married Florence Harper, a waitress, and lived in her parents' basement in Calgary while trying to make ends meet working in construction. Ralph Klein's parents separated when he was five or six years old and he spent time living with his maternal grandparents in the Calgary's north end, and Rocky Mountain House with his mother. After separating from his mother, Klein's father worked as a professional wrestler in the Alberta circuit for most of the 1950s using the name Phil "The Killer" Klein and later became a businessman.

Ralph Klein grew up in a working-class part of Calgary and dropped out of high school in grade 11, joined the Royal Canadian Air Force reserves, then completed high school later in life. Klein's time in the Air Force was limited, returning home a year later shortly after his 18th birthday. Klein attended Calgary Business College studying accounting and business administration, and later served as a teacher and principal of the college. He later studied at Athabasca University. Following his role at the Calgary Business College, Klein took a position as a public relations official at the Southern Alberta district of the Red Cross and United Way's offices in Calgary from 1963 to 1969.

Klein married Hilda May Hepner on April 29, 1961. They met at Portage-la-Prairie while Klein was training with the Air Force. As two strong willed individuals there were many difficulties in maintaining their relationship, and after several separations in the late-1960s and early-1970s, Klein and Hilda formally divorced on March 29, 1972, with adultery cited as the grounds for divorce. Hilda received custody of their two children. Klein remarried three months after his divorce to the Victoria-born Colleen Evelyn Hamilton, a single-mother with two children working as an accounting clerk with Imperial Oil and as a bartender by night. They were married in Colleen's mother's basement by Reverend Robert A. Simpson, and together Ralph and Colleen had one child.

== Journalism career ==
Klein rose to public prominence in Calgary as a radio and television personality between 1969 and 1980. He was the Senior Civic Affairs reporter with CFCN-TV and CFCN radio. Klein built a reputation for thorough reporting and gritty, street-wise "down and dirty" reporter who could see through rhetoric. Klein's reporting style left him ostracized from the journalist community and provoked jealousy amongst the CFCN news group. Klein routinely skipped morning assignment meetings, rarely checked in, yet still would still appear in the afternoon with a new story. During his early career Klein became a staple patron of the St. Louis Hotel bar in Calgary's East Village, an area of synonymous with urban decay in the city.

Klein's early civic affairs beat revolved around following newly elected anti-establishment Mayor Rod Sykes. The relationship between the Mayor Sykes and Klein could be described as fickle, Klein alerted the Mayor to a Calgary Police Service's cannabis bust involving the Mayor's 13-year-old son which Klein believed would involve planting the drugs on the minor. Klein also alerted Sykes about a Canadian Broadcasting Corporation story on a proposed convention centre benefiting from city sources, which Sykes was able to temporarily delay, although Klein's reasons were somewhat selfish as the CBC story would have been released before Klein's story on the topic. Klein's story The Marriage later resulted in invasion of privacy charges pressed against Klein and CFCN over the leak of a meeting recordings, the charges were subsequently thrown out of court.

The 1973 oil crisis created an economic boom in Calgary, and Klein reported on stories which emphasized the lower-class, outcasts and challenges faced by those who did not benefit from urban renewal. Among those challenges was the challenges faced by Chinese-Canadians and overcoming the negative public perceptions stemming from publicized drug sales, prostitution, and other anti-social behaviour taking place in Calgary's Chinatown, through his work, Klein built strong relationships with the community and helped show a more accurate and generous view of the Chinese-Canadian community. Klein produced compelling and vivid stories about biker gangs which were both open and critical about the organizations, all the while building strong relationships by both living and partying with the gangs.

In 1977, CFCN news director Thompson MacDonald commissioned Klein to complete an investigative report on the Blackfoot people and their feelings about the 100th anniversary of Treaty Seven. Klein and a camera man left for Gleichen, Alberta and did not contact MacDonald for a long period of time, which while normal behaviour for Klein, was worrying for the news director. Klein finally made contact from jail after he was arrested by RCMP officers after a bar fight with a government official. Klein continued to work with members of the Blackfoot, who introduced him to the indigenous religion, and provided him with a spiritual advisor. The outcome of Klein's reporting was a moving documentary highlighting the "gap between white intentions and aboriginal realities...on reservations". Klein's documentary focused on the poverty and difficulty of life, and interviewed grocery store owners who sold huge stockpiles of vanilla extract to desperate alcoholics at inflated prices. Although Klein valued his time living with the Blackfoot people, he rarely brought the experience up publicly, instead only sharing the elements outside the documentary with close friends and family. For his effort the Siksika christened Klein "White Writer" and called him a friend.

== Mayor of Calgary ==
Klein grew dissatisfied with the direction of Calgary City Council, urban sprawl and Mayor Ross Alger's proposed civic centre. The enormous proposed city centre required City Council to purchase properties in a five block radius, purchasing historic and small buildings one-by-one. Klein voiced his dissatisfaction through a monthly column in Calgary Magazine, his topics included his displeasure with the city's heavy-handed "block busting" and expropriation tactics, the polluted state of the Bow River, transportation planning and the CTrain, weakness of open government and freedom of information, but always ended his columns with a note of optimism and a challenge to his readers to think of how to improve the city. Through his articles, Klein was able to grab the attention of Calgary voters highlighting the issues they faced. Finally Klein was alerted by former Mayor Rod Sykes to a film crew and actor portraying a "bum" digging through garbage in a downtown alleyway, Klein rushed over and filmed the event. The film crew belonged to an advertising agency which admitted to producing an election television advertisement for incumbent Mayor Alger. Alger had previously noted his new "civic centre" would remove undesirable populations, and the CFCN report on the advertisement showed Alger as cynical and manipulative, eroding his support. Klein's final documentary Dreams, Schemes and Sandstone Dust brought the human element to the civic centre debate, interviewing the bar regulars, hotel tenants and small business owners who were set to be bulldozed, creating a narrative that the areas historic but rundown buildings were worth preserving.

On August 20, shortly after the film crew incident and documentary, Klein uncharacteristically appeared at the morning CFCN news meeting and announced he would run for Mayor against Alger. Klein's campaign started on rocky footing, he had little funds and limited knowledge of how to run a campaign or organize volunteers. He hired his friend Webster MacDonald, a lawyer, and labour organizer Ted Takacs to run co-manage his campaign, but neither was particularly adept. Finally he convened a group of 20 of his friends to discuss moving to the Alderman ticket, and after convincing Klein to continue to run for Mayor, they formed what became known as the "Klein Gang" a group of diehard supporters who remained with him throughout his political career. Shortly afterwards he opened his campaign office in a small space donated by local businessman Jack Singer and his campaign began to take off. It was in this office he first met Rod Love, a recent University of Calgary political science dropout. Love had initially offered to work for Alger's campaign, but was not offered a position he was interested in. The Klein campaign continued to grow, although remained strained financially, with Klein only raising a total of $22,000. In the week before the election Klein's public position improved as many estimated he was neck and neck with Alger, and ahead of the third candidate, Alderman Peter Petrasuk. Alger the incumbent had accumulated $150,000 for the election, had strong support in the Chamber of Commerce, and a clean name. His other opponent, Petrasuk was a prominent lawyer with a large ethnic voter base and significant fundraising capabilities. Klein sought an endorsement from former Mayor Sykes who still held considerable sway amongst voters, Sykes declined as he had previously promised the other candidates he would not endorse any candidate, but agreed to an interview which he would say that Klein stood a chance in the election. The final mayoral debate took place 36 hours before the polls opened, with Alger and Petrasuk battling over rising budgets while Klein ignored the topics and spoke of accountability, open government and making Calgarians proud of the city.

Klein's victory on October 15, 1980, came as a shock to many in the city including his own father who refused to believe the news, and shortly afterwards Klein was installed as the 32nd Mayor of Calgary, and the second Mayor of Calgary to be born in the city. A day after the election the Calgary Herald declared Klein "The People's Mayor" in describing his "stunning victory". Klein was subsequently re-elected twice, first in 1983 and again in 1986.

=== Saddledome construction ===
Klein began his term as mayor with a significant infrastructure project. The newly relocated Calgary Flames were moved to the city just as the city prepared a bid for the 1988 Winter Olympics. A new arena was necessary for both purposes and City Council debated the merits of several locations for the city's new Olympic Coliseum, and narrowed their choices down to two areas in the Victoria Park neighbourhood on the east end of downtown. Two other sites, one on the west end of downtown, and a late bid by several businessmen pushing to build the arena in the northern suburb of Airdrie were also considered.

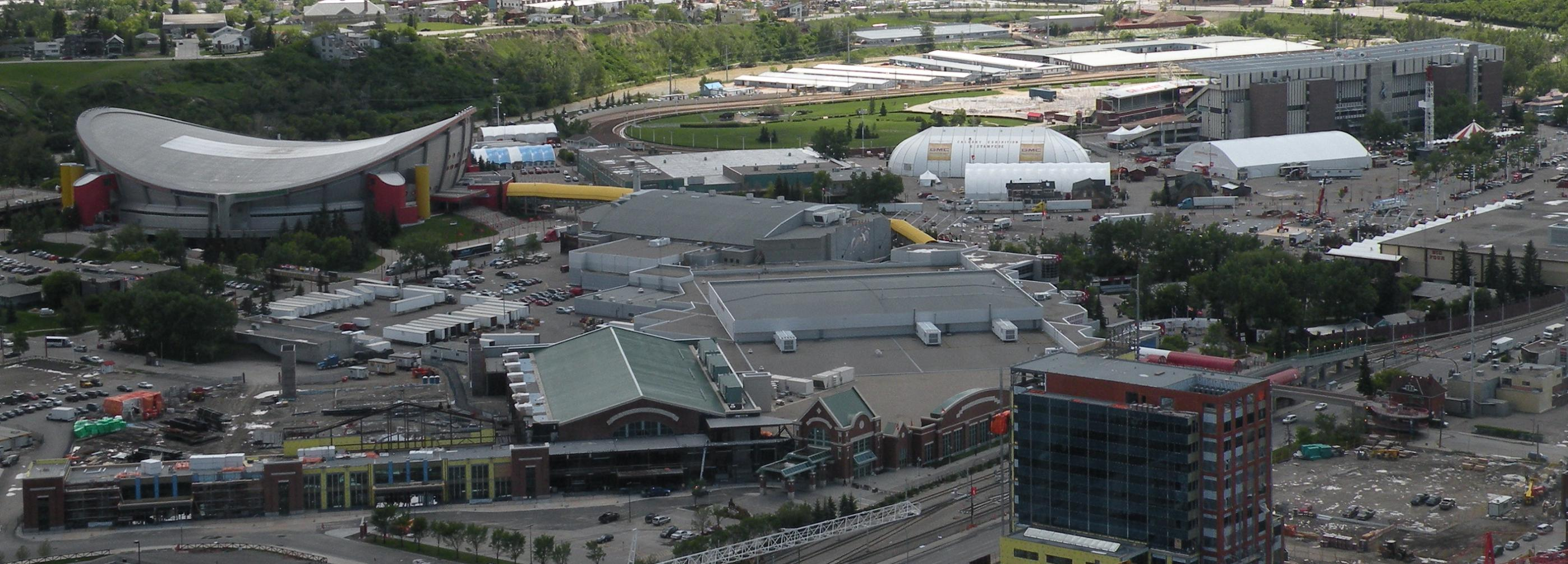
The Saddledome's location within Stampede Park, as seen from the Calgary Tower

The Victoria Park Community Association fought the bid to build the arena in their neighborhood, threatening to oppose the city's Olympic bid if necessary. City Council voted on March 3, 1981, to build the proposed 20,000-seat arena on the Stampede grounds, immediately east of the Corral and south of Victoria Park. The community continued to fight the city over rezoning the land to allow for the new arena amidst fears of traffic congestion in their neighbourhood which resulted in numerous costly delays to the start of construction. In a bid to end the battle, Mayor Ralph Klein asked the provincial government in July 1981 to take over the land designated for the arena to bypass the appeals process and force approval. The province supported the city amidst protests by community associations and invoked rarely used powers to overrule planning regulations, allowing construction to begin. The following day, on July 29, 1981, builders began construction of the arena. The International Olympic Committee was impressed that the project was underway, as noted in the XV Olympic Winter Games official report which stated "The fact that this facility was already being built added credibility to (Calgary's) bid and proved to be a positive factor in demonstrating Calgary's commitment to hosting the Games".

=== 1988 Calgary Winter Olympics ===
During his tenure he presided over the 1988 Winter Olympics, the first Canadian city to host the winter games. The 1988 Calgary bid proposed by the Canadian Olympic Association (COA), would spend nearly three times what the rival Vancouver group proposed. Ralph Klein and other civic leaders crisscrossed the world attempting to woo International Olympic Committee (IOC) delegates as the city competed against rival bids by Falun, Sweden and Cortina d'Ampezzo, Italy.

While the games were viewed as a success for Klein and the city of Calgary, it was not without its issues. Residents had been promised that only 10 percent of tickets would go to "Olympic insiders", IOC officials and sponsors, but OCO'88 was later forced to admit that up to 50 percent of seats to top events had gone to insiders. The organizing committee, which was subsequently chastised by mayor Klein for running a "closed shop", admitted that it had failed to properly communicate the obligations it had to supply IOC officials and sponsors with priority tickets. These events were preceded by OCO'88's ticketing manager being charged with theft and fraud after he sent modified ticket request forms to Americans that asked them to pay in United States funds rather than Canadian and to return them to his company's post office box rather than that of the organizing committee.

During the 1988 Olympics, Klein mistook the King of Norway Olav V for his driver, and asked that he fetch the car. Olav, who was startled, explained who he was as he pulled out his silver cigarette case, after which Klein bummed a cigarette from him.

=== Light rail transit ===
Klein oversaw the development of the Calgary's light rail transit system (known as the Ctrain) which began operation on May 25, 1981, shortly after Klein's first term began, and expanded as the city has increased in population. The system is operated by Calgary Transit, as part of the Calgary municipal government's transportation department. The South Line was planned to extend to the northwest, political pressures led to the commission of the "Northeast Line", running from Whitehorn station (at 36 Street NE and 39 Avenue NE) to the downtown core, with a new downtown terminal station for both lines at 10 Street SW, which opened on April 27, 1985. The "Northwest Line", the extension of the South Line to the city's northwest, was opened on September 17, 1987, in time for the 1988 Winter Olympics.

=== National Energy Program ===
The federal government under Prime Minister Pierre Trudeau introduced the National Energy Program (NEP) which "effectively imposed revenue-sharing burdens on oil and gas revenues in Alberta, in the October 1980 budget shortly after Klein took office as mayor of Calgary.

While he was mayor, the city enjoyed an economic boom. This was contrary to the 1980s global recession around the world. Calgary attracted many unskilled labourers from all over the country. Klein gained unfavourable national attention by blaming eastern "creeps and bums" for straining the city's social services and police. Prior to entering provincial politics, Klein considered himself a Liberal Party supporter. He supported the federal Progressive Conservative Party of Brian Mulroney in the 1988 federal election.

== Entry into provincial politics ==
In 1988, Premier Don Getty approached Klein to run as a member of the Progressive Conservative Party. Getty's popularity waned as Alberta's financial position deteriorated with dropping oil and gas prices, and he saw the popular Calgary Mayor as a valuable candidate. Klein demanded a Cabinet position in the Getty government, which Getty agreed to. Klein also received an offer from Prime Minister Brian Mulroney to join the federal Progressive Conservatives which included a cabinet appointment, but Klein's wife Colleen was not receptive to the move.

Klein made the transition from municipal to provincial politics, and was elected as the Member of the Legislative Assembly for the riding of Calgary-Elbow in the 1989 general election. Klein won the election, defeating Liberal candidate and lawyer Gilbert Clark and two others with 49.6 per cent of the vote. He was subsequently named the Minister of Environment in Don Getty's government, while the Premier lost the election in his home seat of Edmonton-Whitemud, had to wait two months to be elected to the "safe" Progressive Conservative district of Stettler.

As Minister of the Environment Klein's accomplishments included the consolidation of environmental statutes, and the creation of the National Resources Conservation Board. In this role Klein earned a positive reputation amongst industry and some environmentalists. Klein also dealt with several high-profile controversial issues including the Oldman River Dam, Alberta Pacific pulp mill and Swan Hills Waste Treatment Plant.

=== Progressive Conservative leadership bid ===
Premier Don Getty knew that the Tories faced a general election in 1993, and Albertans support of the Progressive Conservatives was dropping. Getty inherited a government with no provincial debt, and ran average deficits of $2.6-billion per year, resulting in an $11-billion debt in 1993. With polls showing the Liberals far ahead, Getty support hovered around 30 per cent, and he decided to retire from politics in 1992. Under former Edmonton mayor Laurence Decore, the Liberals had made major gains by criticizing the Progressive Conservatives' fiscal responsibility, the province's rapidly rising debt, and the government's involvement in the private sector which had seen some companies defaulting on government loans.

The Progressive Conservative Association leadership selection rules changed prior to the 1992 convention, moving away from the caucus system to the one member, one vote system which required one candidate to get a plurality of votes. Party membership could be purchased and provide voting rights up to the close of the polls. Klein faced strong competition from Edmonton MLA and Minister of Health Nancy Betkowski, and seven other candidates. Klein campaigned for Progressive Conservative leadership in part by making arguments similar to Liberal leader Decore's. He favoured a near-immediate balancing of the provincial budget and rapid debt repayment thereafter, and declared his government "out of the business of business". Klein was criticized throughout the leadership campaign by reporters, politicians and other candidates for his hand's off approach to governance and notability for partying. Leadership hopeful and Minister of Culture Doug Main was especially critical charging "We can't win this province back - we can't be the government - with a smoking, drinking, paving, glad-handing premier".

Klein came second in the first ballot on November 28, 1992, with 16,392 votes, one behind Betkowski. The second ballot occurred on December 5 with three candidates, Klein received an overwhelming majority with 46,245 votes (60 per cent) compared to Betkowski's 31,722, and was elected leader of the Progressive Conservatives, and one week later was sworn in as the Premier of Alberta on December 14, 1992. Klein's success at the leadership convention was a surprise to political observers, and occurred despite numerous endorsements from the Progressive Conservative caucus for Betkowski. Klein's victory has been attributed to populist support from rural Albertans who purchased memberships between the first and second ballot.

== Premier ==
Ralph Klein was appointed the 12th Premier of Alberta on December 14, 1992, following his surprising victory. The new government seeking a mandate three years into the 22nd Alberta Legislature began preparing for an election which was called seven months after Klein's appointment as Premier on June 15, 1993. Many of Klein's opponents in the Progressive Conservative leadership did not contest the 1993 election including Nancy Betkowski, John Oldring, Doug Main, and Rick Orman.

During the 1993 campaign Klein distanced himself from the Getty administration and highlighted the changes he had implemented during his short time as Premier. Decore, facing a Premier with whom he agreed on many issues, argued that the Progressive Conservative party had no moral authority left on the issues on which Klein was campaigning. The 1993 election was a success for Klein even with his party losing eight seats, dropping from 59 to 51. The Progressive Conservatives retained a majority government gaining 0.2 per cent of the popular vote from 1989, but still receiving less than 45 percent of the vote. His party captured all but two seats in Calgary, while being shut out of Edmonton entirely. Decore's Liberals formed opposition with 32 seats and 40 per cent of the popular vote, while Ray Martin's New Democrats lost all 16 seats and were shut out of the Legislature, although taking ten percent of the vote and being proportionally due eight or nine MLAs.

The 1993 election would end up being Klein's least successful provincial election, with the 32 Liberals forming the largest opposition during Klein's 12 years as Premier.

Klein's 1997 election proved more successful, reaching a plurality of voters with 51 per cent of the popular vote and 63 seats in the Legislature, including two in Edmonton. Klein achieved his strongest government in 2001 election, winning 62 per cent of the popular vote and 74 of the 83 seats, the largest majority government since the Peter Lougheed era.

The 2001 election victory came against the new Liberal leader and former Progressive Conservative leadership challenger Nancy MacBeth (formerly Betkowski). Klein's final election as Premier in 2004 saw the Progressive Conservative's support drop, winning 62 seats with 47 per cent of the popular vote against Kevin Taft's Liberal Party and Brian Mason's NDP.

=== The Alberta Advantage: Klein's austerity campaign ===
By the mid-1980s there was a worldwide oil glut, a serious surplus of crude oil, with the world price of oil dropping from over US$35 per barrel to below $10. The glut began in the early 1980s as a result of slowed economic activity in industrial countries (due to the crises of the 1970s, especially in 1973 and 1979) and the energy conservation spurred by high fuel prices. Time Magazine stated, "the world temporarily floats in a glut of oil." By 1993, when Klein took office, Alberta's debt had reached CA$23 billion. Despite lower oil prices, Alberta was largely shielded from the early 1990s recession.

Klein's premiership faced its first financial challenge with the MLA Pension Plan, with public outrage growing with the generous payments and "double-dipping" where former cabinet ministers were able to draw immediate pension payments while sitting as backbenchers. Klein attempted to defuse the issue by amending the plan, but when that didn't satisfy the public, he eliminated the pension plan entirely, with MLAs moving to the same general public service pension plan, the bold action was unexpected and added to his credibility.

Balanced budgets and repayment of the provincial debt were significant long-term goals of Klein's premiership. In 1993 Klein followed up on the 1991 government economic strategy paper Toward 2000 Together which was the basis of his 1993 provincial election with the Financial Review Committee whose 1993 report promised to balance the provincial budget by 1997 without raising taxes. The backbone of the economic plan was austerity, often called the "Klein Revolution", or the "Alberta Advantage", as Klein called it. The first priority was reduction of the provincial payroll, which led to the abolishment of more than 4,000 public service positions through amalgamation or elimination of government agencies. Another 1,800 government jobs were eliminated by the privatization of liquor retailers, and motor vehicle and property registration services. The 1994 budget required all departments to cut 20 per cent from their operating budgets and all public servants including Members of the Legislative Assembly, civil servants, teachers, nurses and university staff saw a 5 per cent pay cut and a two-year salary freeze. The Klein government initiated the sale of the provincial Crown Corporations and investments, including the public telephone company, AGT, alcohol sales, Alberta Energy Corporation, and provincial ownership stakes in other business entities. By 1995 owing to rising non-renewable resource revenue, corporate tax revenue and gambling taxes the Klein government had balanced the budget and eliminated the province's deficit two years ahead of schedule, the cost was public spending dropping by $1.9-billion and more than 4,500 public service jobs had been abolished.

In the years following 1995 oil and natural gas prices continued to rise generating significant royalty revenue for the province. Klein's new challenge was convincing the public to "reinvest" in recently cut public services while maintaining his fiscally conservative reputation. Government spending increased dramatically, rising 60 per cent between 1997 and 2001 which garnered rebuke from former administration allies such as the Canadian Taxpayers Federation and other conservative thinktanks. Klein sought to reinvent government in Alberta as a streamlined and efficient operation which heavily relied on privatization and contracting. Progressive Conservatives brought in Ted Gaebler the co-author of Reinventing Government and controversial former New Zealand Labour government Treasurer Roger Douglas to advise on the sweeping reforms.

At the 2004 Calgary Stampede, Klein announced that the province had set aside the necessary funds to repay its public debt in 2005.

"Never again will this government or the people of this province have to set aside another tax dollar on debt..."Those days are over and they're over for good, as far as my government is concerned, and if need be we will put in place legislation to make sure that we never have a debt again."

— Ralph Klein 2004

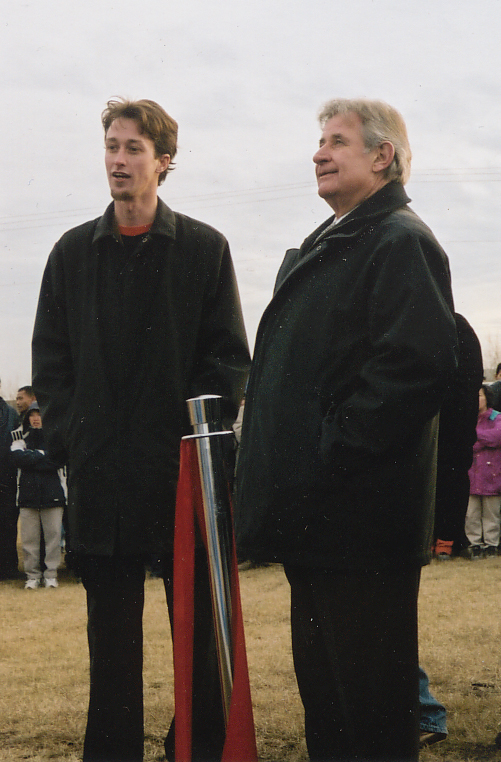
Ralph Klein and sculptor Ryan McCourt at the unveiling of "A Modern Outlook" in Edmonton, Alberta.

From the mid-1980s to September 2003, the inflation adjusted price of a barrel of crude oil on NYMEX was generally under $25/barrel. A rebound in the price of oil worldwide led to big provincial surpluses in Alberta since the mid-1990. During 2004, the price of oil rose above $40, and then $50. A series of events led the price to exceed $60 by August 11, 2005, leading to a record-speed hike that reached $75 by the middle of 2006.

Political analyst David Taras of Mount Royal University argued that although Klein was popular, he failed at public policy. His focus on paying down Alberta's fiscal debt during an oil boom - a time when interest rates on debt were low - was done "at the expense of hospitals, roads, light rail transit lines, and investing in better health-care services or education." Rich Vivone, who was involved in Alberta politics from 1980 to 2005, claimed Klein "had the trust and popularity to do almost anything he wanted and survive" and his "fiscal achievements early in his career were significant, but he "utterly failed at health reform and economic diversification" and he did "little for culture, recreation or the arts."

=== Prosperity Bonus ===
In 2003, as the global price of oil increased Klein first contemplated government oil royalty payments to Albertans. The official announcement for the program came in September 2005, with each Albertan who filed a tax return received a "Prosperity Bonus", known locally as "Ralph Bucks". The program entailed a one-time $400 payment from the Government of Alberta in the form of a mailed cheque to each Alberta resident not in prison, at a cost of $1.4-billion. The Prosperity Bonus program was met with controversy, with critics claiming the funds would be better spent on infrastructure, health or education. Klein responded to the criticism saying if an Albertan did not want the cheque, they could "send it back or donate it to charity", and defended the payment "to some people it means a lot." ATB Financial economist and NDP adviser Todd Hirsch observed, "I think we missed some great opportunities to invest in our post-secondary education systems; instead, we frittered away our money. People got a couple of dinners and put some gas in their Hummer, and that was about it."

=== Health Care ===
Health care and funding were another significant policy objective for the Klein government. In 1994, the Klein government introduced the Regional Health Authorities Act to the 23rd Legislature which amalgamated the 204 hospital boards into 17 regional health authorities. The hospital boards were given significant autonomy to decide which hospitals would be closed or downgraded to the status of community clinics. This resulted in the closure of several urban hospitals including Calgary's General Hospital demolished via implosion in 1998, and the closure of one other hospital in Calgary, and one in Edmonton. The number of acute care beds were halved in a period of three years and coverage of many medical services was reduced or eliminated.

In 2000, the Klein government introduced the Health Care Protection Act (Bill 11) to the 24th Alberta Legislature concerning partial privatization of healthcare evoked large protests at the Legislature. The bill allowed private for-profit clinics to perform minor surgeries and keep patients overnight, which had previously only been performed in hospitals. Klein blamed the two sitting NDP MLAs for fighting the reform, inciting the protests and forcing him to back away from the reform that he still supported. Federal Health Minister Allan Rock expressed his grave reservations over the legislation, but did not deem the Health Care Protection Act to violate the Canada Health Act.

The Klein government continued to search for efficiencies in health care, and in early 2002 the Premier's Advisory Council on Health led by Don Mazankowski released its framework for reform report often referred to as the Mazankowski Report. The report included 43 recommendations the government fully accepted, including more choice, more private involvement, more competition and accountability, less comprehensiveness and increased user medicare co-payments for Alberta's health care system. The direction of the Mazankowski Report towards privatization was expected, however, observers expected a much more radical report. The 2002 budget introduced a few months later raised medicare premiums, tobacco and liquor taxes, eliminated dental and optical subsidies for senior citizens, and also cut the corporate tax rate.

In July 2005 Klein delivered a speech on the "third way" of health care which would lie between the American system and the Canadian system. He proposed a series of provincial health care reforms that would potentially violate the Canada Health Act. Klein's reforms for Alberta would have permitted for-profit care and made it possible to jump queues, to "allow patients to pay cash for some surgery and let doctors practice in both the public and private health systems." Public outcry forced the government to listen to Albertans and the third way was not legislated.

Klein responded by exclaiming, "I don't need this crap" and throwing the Liberal health care policy book at a seventeen-year-old page who had delivered the book during question period in the Alberta legislature. The same booklet later sold on eBay for a reported $1,400, signed by Alberta's Liberal Leader Kevin Taft, with the caption, "Policy on the fly". Earlier in the question period he also had to apologize for calling Liberal leader Kevin Taft a liar on the floor of the legislature, which is considered unparliamentary language. His apology consisted of saying, "Sorry, Mr. Speaker. I won't use the word 'fib.' I'll say that he doesn't tell the whole truth all the time - most of the time." Reacting to comments made in March 2006 by Ontario Premier Dalton McGuinty opposing any two-tiered health care system in Ontario that Klein has proposed in Alberta which would allow quicker access to surgery for those who pay, Klein stated "I'm no doctor, but I think that Mr. McGuinty's got a case of premature speculation".

"This was matched by the elimination of or reduction of hours for 14,753 positions in health care. Regionalization of Alberta's health care was intended to rationalize health services."

=== Ralph Klein and the oil sands ===
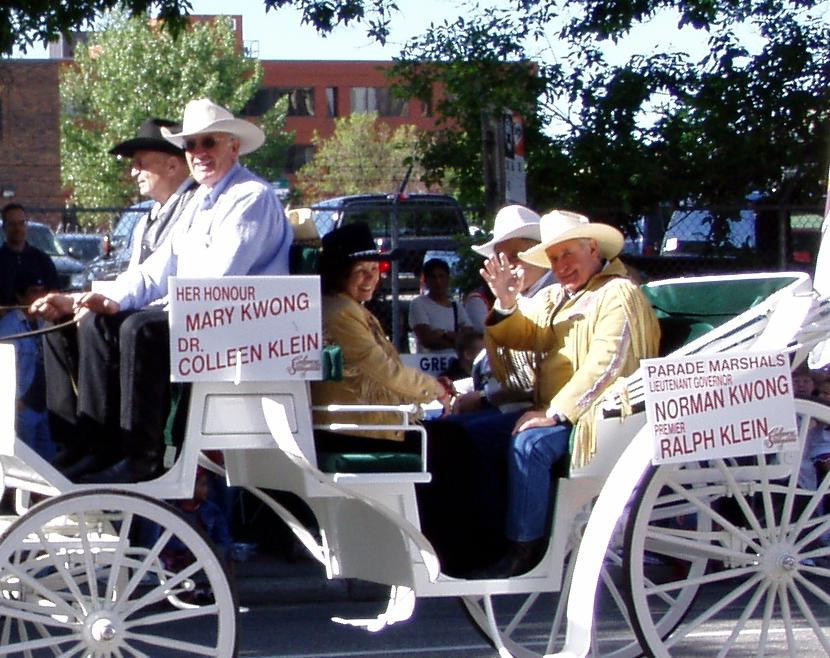
Ralph Klein serving as Marshal at the 2005 Calgary Stampede Parade

Calgary's economy was so closely tied to the oil industry that the city's boom peaked with the average annual price of oil in 1981. As the price of oil rose Alberta's budget surplus stood at $4 billion in 2004. The province used this surplus to eliminate its $3-billion debt.

The subsequent drops in oil prices were cited by industry as reasons for a collapse in the oil industry and consequently the overall Calgary economy. Low oil prices prevented a full recovery until the 1990s. Major investment incentives for oil sands companies were introduced by both the federal government under Prime Minister Jean Chrétien and the provincial government under Klein. The Liberal federal government "reformed and streamlined the tax write-offs it allowed for oil sands firms." Klein "scrapped a welter of one-off royalty deals to create a generic royalty – one that demanded only token payments in the first years of the megaprojects." This facilitated oil sands development.

According to the Calgary Herald,

"Ralph Klein's legacy is inextricably linked to his government's role in encouraging the province's energy industry – particularly his role in presiding over the province as development in northern Alberta's oil sands flourished."

— Kelly Cryderman

Klein changed Alberta's royalty system so that oil companies paid only one per cent of their profits to Alberta until they recovered the cost of the project. The royalty rose to 25 per cent once the recovery cost was reached. Canadian Association of Petroleum Producers (CAPP) claimed there was almost $4 billion coming from oil sands royalties in 2006.

In late June 2003, Klein and U.S. Vice President Dick Cheney met to discuss the route of an Alaskan oil pipeline, which Klein argued had to be integrated with the extensive Alberta pipeline system. This was popular with Cheney and other advocates of North American energy independence in the oil industry.

At the end of Klein's term one of the most common concerns "was that Albertans were not getting enough money for their resources."

=== Agriculture and forestry policy ===
The Alberta agriculture industry faced significant challenges following the discovery of Bovine Spongiform Encephalopathy (BSE) (also known as mad cow disease) in May 2003. The cow was inspected, found to be substandard and removed so that it would not be fed to animals or humans. The carcass was processed into oils and the head sent to the United Kingdom where the case of mad cow was confirmed. An investigation by the Canadian Food Inspection Agency resulted in the slaughter of 2,700 head of cattle. Exports of Canadian beef were halted by numerous countries immediately, most notably including the United States and Japan. Trade relations with the United States further deteriorated in December 2003 when a case of BSE was discovered in a cow imported from Canada to a farm near Yakima, Washington.

Klein's response to BSE was highly criticized when he made a public statement "I guess any self-respecting rancher would have shot, shovelled and shut up, but he didn't do that," referring to the farmer in northern Alberta whose animal was found to have the disease when it was taken to a slaughterhouse. Exports of Canadian beef cattle had already been stopped at the U.S. border, with other countries already following suit. Japan had been a key stumbling block to getting the U.S. border reopened because it made clear it might rethink taking U.S. beef if it had Canadian beef mixed in with it. The United States eventually lifted restrictions on Canadian beef imports in stages, starting with cattle under 30 months of age in late-2003, then meat products in 2004, and later greater trade reductions in July 2005. Japan was slower to reopen trade with Canada, with the final BSE related restrictions on Canada beef lifted in 2019.

As part of economic diversification initiatives as Minister of Environment, Klein approved in December 1990 the construction of North America's largest pulp mill by Alberta-Pacific Forest Industries Inc. The pulp mill was touted as the first in a new generation constructed to meet higher environmental standards put in place in the late 1980s. Alberta-Pacific received a loan of $264 million from the Alberta government through the Alberta Heritage Savings Trust Fund in what Klein called a "sweetheart deal". Against the advice of the Auditor General and the Provincial Treasurer on March 31, 1997, Klein wrote off all interest of the loan, totaling $140 million to the Alberta-Pacific Joint Venture when prices were low for pulp. Klein made national headlines during the announcement when he flipped off an environmental activist who was protesting the government's the approval. Klein defended his actions by noting that it was the protester who made the offensive gesture first.

=== Same-sex marriage ===
In June 2003, the Court of Appeal for Ontario decision in Halpern v Canada (AG) which found the common law definition of marriage, which defined marriage as between one man and one woman, violated section 15 of the Canadian Charter of Rights and Freedoms. Klein repeated a promise to use the Notwithstanding Clause in the Charter of Rights and Freedoms to veto any requirement that the province register same-sex marriages, however the government recanted as legal scholars questioned whether the action would have been constitutional. Contrary to many media reports which annoyed Klein, this was a position of the Alberta Legislature which passed the Marriage Amendment Act in March 2000 defining marriage exclusively as an opposite-sex union and attempted to insulate the decision by invoking the Notwithstanding Clause. In December 2004, Klein called for a national referendum on the issue of same-sex marriage. This plan was quickly rejected by the government of Paul Martin and by federal Conservative Party leader Stephen Harper.

Following the Parliament of Canada's approval of same-sex marriage in 2005 via Civil Marriage Act (Bill C-38), Klein announced initially that his government would fight the distribution of same-sex marriage licences. However, he later recanted, stating publicly that there was no legal route to oppose the federal act (neither via the notwithstanding clause nor the province's power over civil marriage), and the government reluctantly acknowledged the marriages officially on June 20, 2005.

=== Law enforcement ===
It was under Klein's government that the Alberta Sheriffs Branch, was re-organized into its current state. The Klein government increasingly utilized CAPS, the precursor to the Sheriffs Branch, for special provincial law enforcement duties instead of the RCMP. In 2006, CAPS was renamed and the newly christened Sheriffs Branch was expanded rapidly to take on assignments that previously were the purview of the RCMP, the provincial policing authority. At this time, the Alberta Law Enforcement Response Teams were also created.

=== Environment ===
Klein's social and environmental views were seen by opponents as uncaring. Supporters argued in response that Klein was merely choosing appropriate priorities for limited government funding.

Klein was opposed to the Kyoto Accord, since Alberta was a major producer of oil and natural gas, and he felt that environmental measures would hurt the economy. The successive government initiated a massive carbon-capture project.

At a 2002 fund-raiser Klein joked,

"You know, my science is limited to the fact that I know that eons ago there was an ice age. I know that for sure. I know that at one time, the Arctic was the tropics. And I guess I wonder what caused that? Was it dinosaur farts? I don't know."

— Ralph Klein

=== Leadership review and retirement ===
Prior to the 2004 election, Klein stated his intention to serve only one more term in office. Pressure mounted on Klein to set a firm date and, following such a request from party executive director Peter Elzinga, Klein announced on March 14, 2006, that he would be tendering his resignation on October 31, 2007. He later proposed that his resignation would take effect in early 2008 after a successor is chosen at the party's leadership election.

Klein announced this timetable days before party delegates were to vote in a review of his leadership on March 31, 2006. The drawn-out schedule for his retirement, along with his announcement that any cabinet minister who wished to run for leader must resign by June 2006, generated a large degree of controversy, including criticism from cabinet minister Lyle Oberg who was subsequently fired from cabinet and suspended from caucus.

When the leadership review ballot was held on March 31, 2006, only 55 per cent of the delegates supported Klein. This was down from the 90 per cent level of support he had won at previous reviews and far lower than the 75 per cent Klein said he felt he needed in order to continue. The result was described as a "crushing blow" to Klein's leadership.

Prior to the vote, Klein had said he would resign immediately if he did not win the leadership review by a "substantial" margin. In the hours following the vote, Klein released a statement thanking delegates for their support and saying he would take several days to consider his future.

Given the results of this vote, I intend to meet with party officials and my staff to discuss my next step. I will do this as quickly as possible and announce a decision about my future shortly.

— Ralph Klein

At a press conference on April 4, 2006, Klein announced that as a result of the lukewarm vote for his continued leadership he would submit a letter in September to Alberta's Progressive Conservative Party urging it to convene a leadership contest. Klein said he would resign as party leader and premier after a successor was named, and would assist the new leader in their transition to premier.

Klein officially handed in his resignation as party leader on September 20, 2006, officially kicking off the Alberta Progressive Conservative Party leadership race. However, Klein remained premier until the new PC Leader, Ed Stelmach, assumed office on December 14, 2006.

Klein resigned his seat in the legislature on January 15, 2007.

== Later life ==
On January 18, 2007, the law firm Borden Ladner Gervais announced that Klein, who is not a lawyer, would join their firm as a senior business adviser who would bring "valuable insights to our clients as they look to do business in Alberta, in Canada, and in North America".

In a July 9, 2007, interview on Business News Network, Klein criticized Conservative PM Stephen Harper and Federal Finance Minister Jim Flaherty for their mishandling of the Income Trust issue and for not keeping their word on Income Trust taxation. According to the Canadian Association of Income Trust Investors, the change in tax rules cost investors $35 billion in market value. Stephen Harper specifically promised "not to raid seniors' nest eggs" during the 2006 federal election.

On March 27, 2008, Klein was created an Officer of the Order of the Legion of Honour by the Government of France. The creation had been approved by the Government of Canada on November 24, 2007.

On March 20, 2010, Klein appeared on his own television game show called On the Clock on the Crossroads Television System network. Klein, shown perched on a golden throne, evaluates the responses and awards "Ralph Bucks" to the contestants whose answers he found the best. The person who has the most Ralph Bucks at the end of the game is declared the winner.

== Illness and death ==
On December 15, 2010, it was reported that Klein, a lifetime smoker, was suffering from COPD, a lung disease. His long-time friend Hal Walker commented that Klein was "not well."

On April 8, 2011, it was reported that Klein was suffering from Pick's disease, a form of progressive dementia.

Klein was hospitalized in September 2011 due to complications from COPD and dementia. He died in Calgary on March 29, 2013.

== Honours ==
In September 2005 during the 22nd meeting of the American region of the Assemblée parlementaire de la Francophonie in Alberta, Premier Ralph Klein and Speaker Kenneth Kowalski received the Order of La Pléiade, for individuals who have contributed to the promotion of the French language and culture in their respective jurisdictions. Klein would also be made an Officer of the Legion of Honour by France in 2008.

He received the Queen Elizabeth II Golden Jubilee Medal in 2002, the Alberta Centennial Medal in 2005, The Queen Elizabeth II Diamond Jubilee Medal in 2012 and was appointed to the Alberta Order of Excellence in 2010.

Honorary Doctor of Laws Degree from University of Calgary in 2011. and a member of the Order of Canada in late 2012.

In 1980, shortly after he was elected Mayor of Calgary, Klein was made an honorary Blackfoot Chief under the name "Oots-squi-peeks" meaning "Blue Bird", one of only two to be honoured as such. Klein found the spiritualism inspiring and prepared mentally for provincial elections in sweat lodges, carried an eagle feather in his briefcase and hung sweetgrass braids in his office.

Ralph Klein Park in Calgary is the first park to be named for a former mayor during his lifetime. The 30.35 hectares (75.0 acres) site contains an Environmental Education Centre and man-made wetland to improve stormwater quality before it enters the Bow River system.

In a July 2014 poll of Albertans asking who the best Premier since 1985 is, 59% of respondents picked Ralph Klein.

== Controversies ==
Ralph Klein was widely known for public mishaps and the inability for controversy or scandal to significantly weaken his public perceptions. Klein's exploits while under the influence of alcohol were well known and publicized amongst Albertans and Canadians. Prior to his successful campaign for leadership of the Progressive Conservative Association, Klein was pressed by reporters and politicians on his drinking, leading Edmonton Journal reporter Don Martin to quip "Let's face it. Klein's liver has a busy reputation.", Klein responded to questions stating "I like to party, yes. I've shared that with some of my colleagues that I enjoy a drink or two. But I can change. That's not to say I'm going to totally quit.".

Klein was commonly spotted at casinos, with a preference for private card rooms, video lottery terminals and horse racing. Klein publicly admitted to having a "borderline gambling addiction" wagering hundreds on nights in the casino, having lost up to $7,000 in a single night.

In the late 1980s Klein was photographed in a Calgary bar drinking with two members of the Grim Reapers Motorcycle Club, later to be patched over to the Hells Angels. Years later, this photo was used against him by the Hells Angels when he objected to them patching over two motorcycle clubs in Alberta and promised greater funding to police in 1997.

Klein had numerous run-ins with protesters throughout his political career, including a December 1990 incident where Klein was photographed giving the finger to a protester at a news conference called to announce the approval of the controversial $1.6-billion Alberta Pacific pulp mill project in Athabasca, and the July 2003 incident where Klein was the recipient of a pieing at the annual Premier's Stampede Breakfast in Calgary.

In April 1994, Klein commented on the that a youth court judge who had suggested he would not sit in order to protest proposed reductions to provincial court justice salaries should be "very, very quickly fired" was brought before the Supreme Court of Canada in the Provincial Judges Reference (1997) for raising concerns about judicial independence. The court merely said the comment was "unfortunate."

Public opinion regarding Klein's alcohol consumption reached a boiling point in December 2001 when he visited the Herb Jamieson Centre, a 249-bed homeless shelter in Edmonton while intoxicated. An argument ensued between Klein and homeless men sleeping in the hallway who were denied a bed because they had been drinking. During the argument Klein told the men to get a job, which was rebuked by some of the men who stated they had jobs but could still not afford housing. An argumentative Klein was shuffled out of the centre while he tossed money at a homeless man on the way out. According to biographer Don Martin, Klein continued with his normal schedule in the following days, and when rumors of the event began to pop-up amongst the media, Klein was unable to remember the event. After the event Klein called a press conference and emotionally acknowledged he had an alcohol problem and pledged to curb or stop his drinking. He called alcohol "the devil" and an "awful beast", but did not go as far as acknowledging he suffered from alcoholism. Klein admitted to being intoxicated at many moments in his life, visibly during his 2001 general election party, a month earlier when he introduced former US President Bill Clinton, and at the public memorial for Calgary sportscasting legend Ed Whalen.

In February 2006, the Western Standard magazine came under fire for printing comments about Klein's wife Colleen Klein, who is Métis. A column by Ric Dolphin, arguing that Colleen Klein has too much influence over her husband, quoted an unnamed source who said "Once she stops being the premier's wife, she goes back to being just another Indian."

During a charity roast on November 9, 2006, Klein made a lewd joke at the expense of former Conservative Member of Parliament Belinda Stronach: "Belinda roasted me as a Conservative, but of course now she's a Liberal.. and I wasn't surprised that she crossed over; I don't think she ever did have a Conservative bone in her body.. well, except for one." (Referring to Peter MacKay, her former boyfriend, who is a member of the Conservative Party of Canada.) Klein refused to apologize for the remark stating that "a roast is a roast is a roast is a roast", while his spokesman pointed out that "Ms. Stronach roasted the premier two years ago and made remarks about his weight, his clothing and even his flatulence".

== See also ==
- List of Alberta premiers
