= Bill Allen (Canadian politician) =

Canadian politician (1946–2026)

William James Gilbert Allen (August 12, 1946 – January 25, 2026) was a Canadian politician in Saskatchewan. He represented Regina Rosemont from 1975 to 1982 in the Legislative Assembly of Saskatchewan as a New Democratic Party (NDP) member.

== Life and career ==
Allen was born in Regina, Saskatchewan on August 12, 1946, the son of Alfred B. Allen and Delores M. Holmes. He was educated there, at St. Peter's College and at the University of Saskatchewan. Allen was defeated by Gordon Dirks when he ran for reelection to the Saskatchewan assembly in 1982.

Allen died on January 25, 2026, at the age of 79.
