= David J. Russell (politician) =

Canadian politician (1931–2023)

The Honourable David J. Russell
- David J. Russell

2nd Deputy Premier of Alberta
- In office November 1, 1985 – March 1989
- Preceded by: Hugh Horner
- Succeeded by: Jim Horsman

Member of the Legislative Assembly of Alberta
- In office 1967–1971
- Constituency: Calgary Victoria Park
- In office 1971–1989
- Succeeded by: Ralph Klein
- Constituency: Calgary Elbow

Personal details
- Born: July 29, 1931 Calgary, Alberta, Canada
- Died: August 17, 2023 (aged 92) Calgary, Alberta, Canada
- Party: Progressive Conservative Association of Alberta
- Education: University of Manitoba; Cornell University
- Occupation: Architect

David John Russell (July 29, 1931 – August 17, 2023) was a Canadian politician from Alberta.

== Life and career ==
David John Russell was born in Calgary, Alberta on July 29, 1931.

Russell was elected to Calgary City Council and served as Alderman from 1960–1961 and then again from 1963 to 1967. He was an architect by profession and attended the University of Manitoba and Cornell University where he earned Bachelor of Architecture and Master of Landscape Architecture degrees.

Russell was first elected to the Legislative Assembly of Alberta as a Progressive Conservative member in the 1967 Alberta general election for Calgary Victoria Park. Russell served one term as the member for that riding as a member for the Progressive Conservative opposition under Peter Lougheed.

In the 1971 Alberta general election Russell was re-elected as the member for the new district of Calgary Elbow. The Progressive Conservative party formed the government in that election. Russell served 5 terms as the member for the riding and retired in 1989.

Russell served as Deputy Premier from 1986 to 1989.

David J. Russell died in Calgary on August 17, 2023, at the age of 92.

Preceded by New District	MLA Calgary Victoria Park; 1967–1971	Succeeded by District Abolished
Preceded by New District	MLA Calgary Elbow; 1971–1989	Succeeded by Ralph Klein
