= Craig Cheffins =

Canadian politician

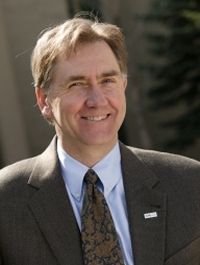

MLA for Calgary-Elbow
- In office June 12, 2007 – March 3, 2008
- Preceded by: Ralph Klein
- Succeeded by: Alison Redford

Personal details
- Born: 1954 or 1955 (age 71–72)
- Party: Liberal

Craig Cheffins is a former member of the Legislative Assembly of Alberta for the Calgary-Elbow riding. Running as a Liberal, he won the seat in a 2007 by-election, but lost the seat in the 2008 general election.

== Political life ==
A by-election was called to replace former premier Ralph Klein, who vacated the seat, after retiring as premier of Alberta. He was considered a "prime candidate" in the by-election, according to Don Braid, of the Calgary Herald., and won the by-election by approximately 800 votes. The constituency had previously elected Progressive Conservative candidates in every election and by-election since 1971.

Previously Cheffins was the president of the Calgary community of Lakeview and involved in the West Hillhurst community associations. He was also active in prior Liberal party campaigns.

Cheffins was an active member of the Weaselhead Preservation Society.

Cheffins lost the provincial election on March 3, 2008.

On September 11, 2008 Craig Cheffins announced he was supporting Dave Taylor for the leadership of the Alberta Liberal Party, and would be taking on the role of Campaign Co-Chair for that effort.

== Election results ==
2008 Alberta general election: Calgary-Elbow
Party	Candidate	Votes	%	±%
Progressive Conservative	Alison Redford	6,130	42.08	+3.75
Liberal	Craig Cheffins	5,711	39.20	−6.57
Wildrose Alliance	Dale Nelson	963	6.61	+2.44
Independent	Barry Erskine	948	6.51	
Green	Jonathon Sheffield	526	3.61	−1.99
New Democratic	Garnet Wilcox	290	1.99	−1.31
Total valid votes		14,568	100.00	
Total rejected ballots		77		
Turnout		14,645	45.84	
Eligible voters		31,947		
Progressive Conservative gain from Liberal		Swing		+5.16%

Alberta provincial by-election, June 12, 2007: Calgary-Elbow Resignation of Ralph Klein on January 15, 2007
Party	Candidate	Votes	%	±%
Liberal	Craig Cheffins	4,823	45.77	+9.24
Progressive Conservative	Brian Heninger	4,039	38.33	−13.15
Green	George Read	590	5.60	+0.66
Alberta Alliance	Jane Morgan	439	4.17	+0.56
New Democratic	Al Brown	348	3.30	+0.75
Social Credit	Trevor Grover	175	1.66	+1.15
Independent	Jeff Willerton	124	1.17	—
Total valid votes		10,538	—	—
Rejected, spoiled and declined		13	25	3
Eligible electors / turnout		30,538	34.64	—
Liberal gain from Progressive Conservative		Swing		+11.20
Source(s) Alberta. Chief Electoral Officer (2007). Report on the June 12, 2007 By-elections: Calgary-Elbow & Drumheller-Stettler (Report). Edmonton: Legislative Assembly of Alberta; Chief Electoral Officer.

== Career ==
Cheffins' employer at the time of the 2007 by-election was Mount Royal College (MRC), where he was the Work Experience Coordinator of the Justice Studies department.
