= Shoot, shovel, and shut up =

Method of dealing with unwanted animals

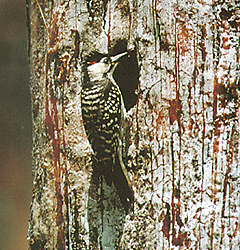
Habitat protection measures for this woodpecker could tempt landowners to employ the 3-S treatment.

Shoot, shovel, and shut up, also known as the 3-S treatment, refers to a method for dealing with unwanted or unwelcome animals primarily in rural areas. There have been reports of the frequently illegal triple-step procedure being used to dispatch mischievous pets, endangered species, and even sick livestock. Individuals often engage in this practice to protect property or pets from predatory species protected by law, especially if other measures to protect their animals are infeasible. For instance, eagles, a protected species, have occasionally attacked and killed young livestock on ranches. Similarly, there have been multiple incidents where hawks have attacked and killed small farm poultry and pets. Farmers and pet owners caught killing such animals have been prosecuted, regardless of their reasons for doing so.

When applied to marauding dogs, the implication is that the offending canine will be killed by firearm and, as far as the owner is concerned, disappear with no apparent clues because of the reticence of the person employing the method. The phrase was used in this sense in Living Well on Practically Nothing by Edward H. Romney, who pointed out that while one might get away with using the 3-S treatment in rural areas, suburban neighborhoods have different norms. This practice is more common in rural areas, where there is less of a population to witness illegal activities.

Pittsburgh Tribune-Review columnist Ralph R. Reiland wrote an essay called "Shoot, Shovel & Shut Up", describing landowners' reactions to finding red-cockaded woodpeckers on their property. Under the Endangered Species Act, landowners who have a population of such birds on their property may be subject to restrictions on building and other land uses that would interfere with the animals' habitat. Therefore, it was considered prudent to eliminate the birds before the government noticed their presence. The Fall 2001 issue of the Sierra Citizen notes, "'Shoot, shovel and shut up' is the mantra of many in the so-called 'property rights' movement ... It refers to the practice of killing and burying evidence of any plants or animals that might be threatened or endangered." The property rights movement argues that the Endangered Species Act should be amended to compensate property owners for protecting endangered species, rather than making an endangered species a financial drain on the owners, and that the current act hastens the decline of some endangered species when listed by causing property owners to "shoot, shovel, and shut up" to avoid expected losses.

Jim Robbins writes in Wolves Across the Border that Mon Teigen, director of the Montana Stockgrowers Association, "believes labyrinthine federal endangered species regulations may lead a few ranchers to control wolves with the three-S method". In 2005, after a court ruled that ranchers could not shoot wolves caught attacking livestock, the Associated Press reported that "Sharon Beck, an Eastern Oregon rancher and former president of the Oregon Cattlemen's Association, said the ruling leaves ranchers little recourse but to break the law—known around the West as 'shoot, shovel and shut up'—when wolves move into their areas".

The phrase has also been used in reference to mad cow disease. More than 30 countries banned beef imports from Canada after one of Albertan farmer Marwyn Peaster's cattle tested positive for the illness. Alberta Premier Ralph Klein, in frustration over the situation, said that any "self-respecting rancher would have shot, shovelled and shut up".
