= Alison Redford =

Premier of Alberta from 2011 to 2014

The Honourable Alison Redford ECA KC
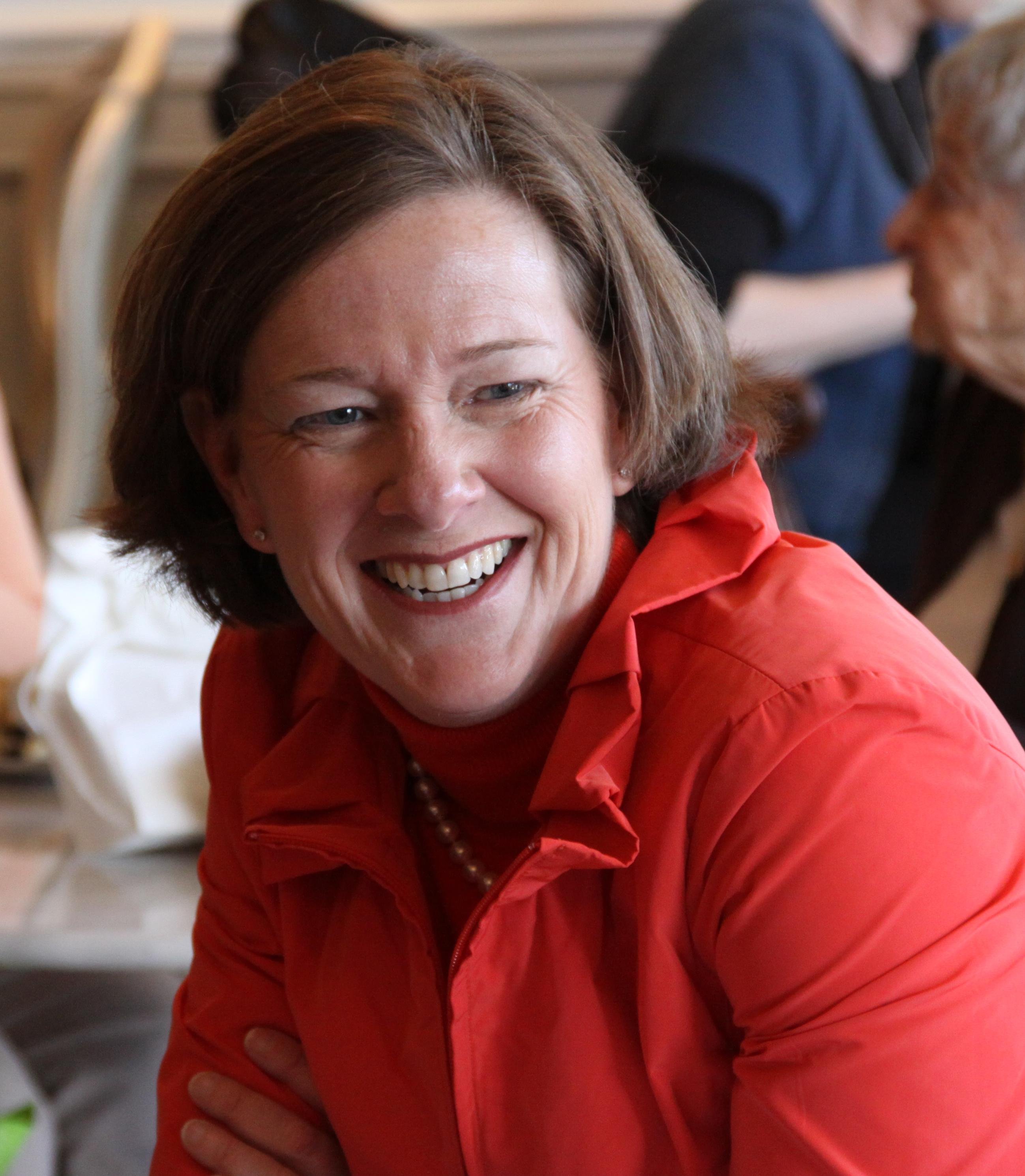
- Redford in 2012

14th Premier of Alberta
- In office October 7, 2011 – March 23, 2014
- Monarch: Elizabeth II
- Lieutenant Governor: Donald Ethell
- Deputy: Doug Horner; Thomas Lukaszuk; Dave Hancock
- Preceded by: Ed Stelmach
- Succeeded by: Dave Hancock

Leader of the Progressive Conservative Association of Alberta
- In office October 1, 2011 – March 23, 2014
- Preceded by: Ed Stelmach
- Succeeded by: Dave Hancock (interim)

Minister of Justice and Attorney General of Alberta
- In office March 12, 2008 – February 18, 2011
- Premier: Ed Stelmach
- Preceded by: Ron Stevens
- Succeeded by: Verlyn Olson

Member of the Legislative Assembly of Alberta for Calgary-Elbow
- In office March 3, 2008 – August 6, 2014
- Preceded by: Craig Cheffins
- Succeeded by: Gordon Dirks

Personal details
- Born: Alison Merrilla Redford; March 7, 1965 (age 61) Kitimat, British Columbia, Canada
- Party: Progressive Conservative (2008–2014)
- Spouse(s): Robert Hawkes (m. 1985; div. 1991) Glen Jermyn
- Children: 1
- Education: University of Saskatchewan
- Occupation: Politician; Lawyer; Civil Servant

Alison Merrilla Redford ECA KC (born March 7, 1965) is a Canadian lawyer and former politician. She was the 14th premier of Alberta, having served in this capacity from October 7, 2011, to March 23, 2014. Redford was born in Kitimat, British Columbia, and lived across Canada and overseas before settling in Calgary as a teenager.

In the 2008 provincial election, Redford was elected as the Member of the Legislative Assembly (MLA) for the district of Calgary-Elbow. She served in the cabinet of Ed Stelmach as the Minister of Justice and Attorney General. Redford became premier upon winning the leadership of the Progressive Conservative Association of Alberta, and on April 23, 2012, she led her party to victory in the 2012 provincial election. Redford is the first female premier in the province's history and the eighth woman to serve as a premier in the history of Canada. Of the Alberta premiers with an elected mandate, her term in office was the shortest.

On March 19, 2014, Redford announced that she would resign as premier of Alberta effective March 23, 2014. She was succeeded by Deputy Premier Dave Hancock on an interim basis. She announced her resignation as an MLA on August 6, 2014.

== Early life ==
Redford was born March 7, 1965, in Kitimat, British Columbia, the daughter of Helen Kay (née Anderson) and Merrill Redford. Her mother was a Scottish immigrant, originally from Glasgow. Redford's family moved to Nova Scotia and Borneo, and to Calgary by the time Redford was 12. She graduated from Bishop Carroll High School, Calgary, and the College of Law at the University of Saskatchewan in 1988.

Throughout the 1990s, Redford worked as a technical adviser on constitutional and legal reform issues in various parts of Africa for the European Union, the Commonwealth Secretariat, the Canadian Government and the Government of Australia. Her work in Africa focused on human rights litigation, developing education programs, and policy reform with respect to gender issues.

One of Redford's most notable appointments was by the Secretary-General of the United Nations as one of the four International Election Commissioners to administer Afghanistan's first parliamentary elections, held in September 2005. Political issues in the elections program within Alberta at that time were under question by the Elections Commissioner. She also served as an adviser to the Privy Council Office on Canada's future involvement in Afghanistan subsequent to the elections. Her work has included assignments in Bosnia and Herzegovina, Serbia, Namibia, Uganda, Zimbabwe, Mozambique, and the Philippines. Before her most current post, Redford managed a judicial training and legal reform project for the Ministry of Justice and the Supreme People's Court in Vietnam.

Redford is also a past member of the Girl Guides of Canada and was featured in a museum exhibit about prominent Girl Guides at the Red Deer Museum and Art Gallery.

== Political career ==
=== Federal politics ===
In the 1980s Redford served as Senior Policy Advisor to former Prime Minister Joe Clark, who was the Secretary of State for External Affairs. She went on to work in the Office of the Prime Minister of Canada from 1988 to 1990, under Prime Minister Brian Mulroney. In this capacity, Redford organized a series of national foreign policy consultations facilitating public input on the Government of Canada's White Papers on Foreign Affairs and Defence. In the Canadian Parliament, she was also the Principal Legislative Advisor to the Secretary of State for External Affairs.

In 2004, Redford unsuccessfully challenged Member of Parliament Rob Anders for the federal Conservative nomination in Calgary West.

=== Provincial politics ===
On March 13, 2008, after being elected MLA for the constituency of Calgary-Elbow, Redford was named Minister of Justice and Attorney General by Premier Ed Stelmach. In addition, she also served as a member of the Agenda and Priorities Committee, the Treasury Board, and the Cabinet Policy Committee on Public Safety and Services. She resigned from the cabinet in early 2011 to devote herself to her campaign to succeed Stelmach as leader of the governing Progressive Conservative Party.

== Premier ==
=== Party leadership ===
On February 16, 2011, Redford announced she would be a candidate in the Progressive Conservative Association leadership race to succeed Stelmach, who had announced in January he would resign as leader and premier once his successor was chosen. Redford was largely considered an outsider and had the support of only one MLA in her leadership campaign.

In the first round of voting held on September 18, 2011, Redford placed second behind Gary Mar, the perceived frontrunner and the preferred candidate of caucus, with 19 per cent of the vote compared to 41 per cent for Mar. Redford's supporters included a large percentage of new members who had purchased party memberships solely to support her bid to provide progressive new leadership to a party which had held power in the province since 1971. Redford's promise to reverse the government's $107-million education cut gained the support of teachers and appealed to many Albertans who had lost confidence in the party establishment. With no candidate winning the necessary 50 per cent plus one on the first ballot a second and third round of voting was held on October 2, 2011. After the third round of voting Redford beat Mar, winning 51 per cent of the vote.

Redford was sworn in as Alberta's 14th Premier at the Alberta Legislature in Edmonton on October 7, 2011.

=== 2012 election ===
On March 26, 2012, Redford met with Lieutenant Governor Don Ethell, who dissolved the current legislature and called an election for April 23, 2012. After the election was called, support for the Wildrose Party supposedly surged past Redford's Progressive Conservatives. Throughout the campaign it was thought by some that the Wildrose, led by Danielle Smith, would win a majority government, ending the PC's 40-year reign.

However, on election night, the Progressive Conservatives shocked pollsters and media pundits, by winning a twelfth majority government, taking 61 of the 87 seats in the provincial legislature—a loss of only five seats. The Wildrose Party accused her of pursuing moderate policies to attract Liberal and NDP supporters in an attempt to prevent the right-wing Wildrose Party from gaining a foothold. Wildrose lost momentum in the final weeks of the campaign, due to Smith's defence of two Wildrose candidates who had made controversial remarks. According to the National Post, two of the Wildrose candidates' extreme views, as well as Smith's refusal to condemn them, cost her a chance of unseating Redford. Ultimately, Wildrose failed to get much support in the urban areas, winning only two seats in Calgary and being shut out in Edmonton. With this win, Redford became the fourth woman in Canadian history to lead a political party to victory in an election, after Catherine Callbeck in Prince Edward Island, Pat Duncan in Yukon, and Kathy Dunderdale in Newfoundland and Labrador.

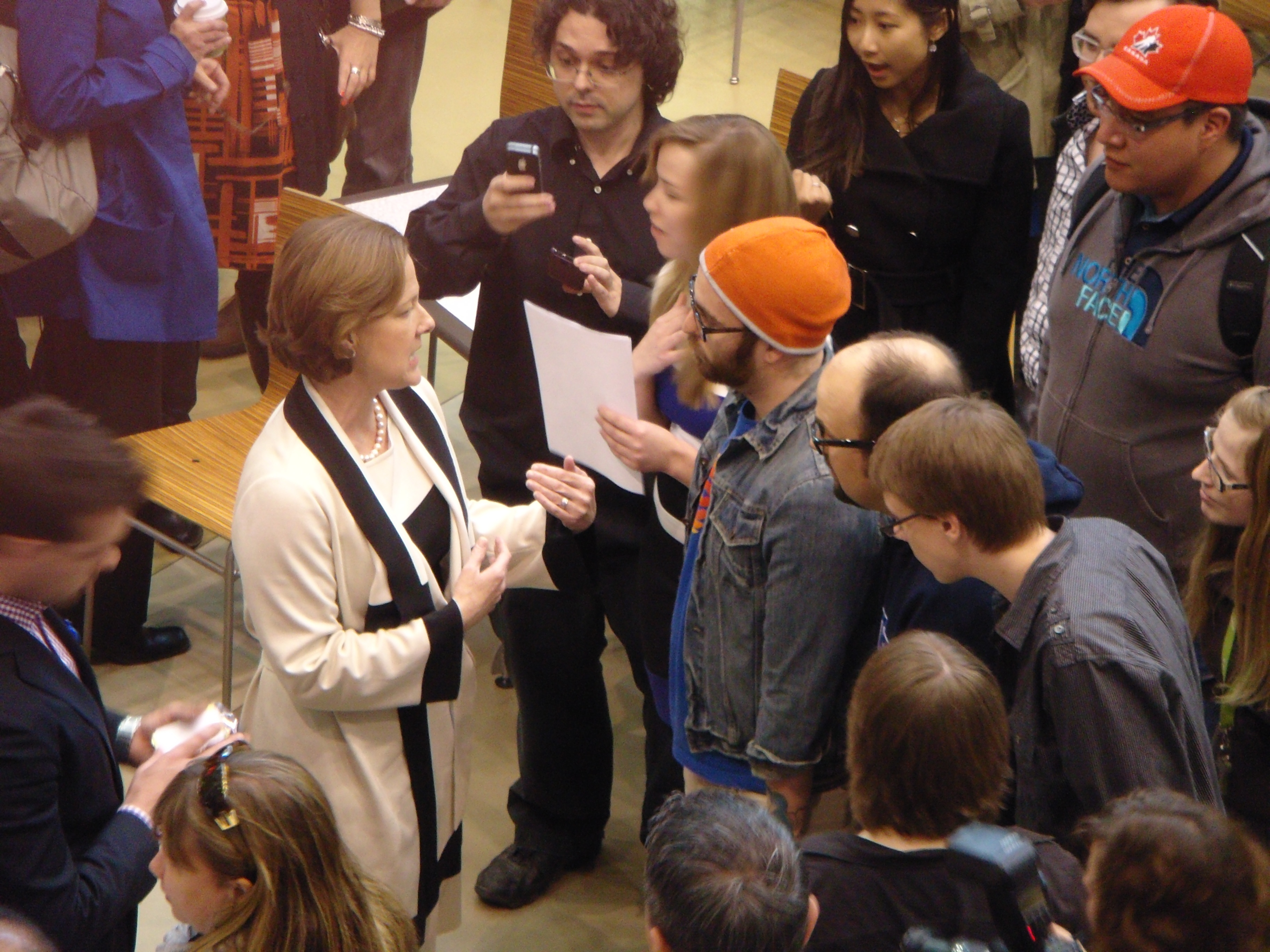
Redford campaigning during the 2012 provincial election

As part of the PC campaign platform, Redford expressed her intentions to work with nonprofits, calling for the creation of a new Department of Human Services as a "single point of entry" for non-profits. Redford promised to build, of which some have now opened, 50 new schools, and renovate 70 more over the next four years.

=== Post-2012 election Premiership ===
==== Fiscal policy ====
One of Redford's first actions as Premier was to abolish extra pay for committee work by Members of the Legislative Assembly. The issue of committee pay had been contentious during the 2012 election, and news of a so-called "No-Meet Committee" in which MLAs were paid handsomely for little or no actual work had prompted wide public outrage. Another election issue had been "gold-plated pensions" and Redford rejected the advice of a panel of experts to reinstate handsome pensions for MLAs, as well as a suggestion she hike her own salary in excess of $300,000, instead vowing not to take a pension at all. In the wake of public spending scandals involving the Minister for Tourism and senior executives with Alberta Health Services, Redford also instituted new transparency measures and accountability in the form of public disclosure of expense spending. In 2013, after much public discussion following the dismissal of her chief of staff and the refusal to discuss his severance, Redford announced the creation of a "sunshine list" - a public disclosure of salaries and severances for public sector workers in the highest levels of Alberta's public sector.

A year after she resigned her role as Premier, Redford reflected on her tenure in a Globe and Mail interview:

After a long stretch of soul-searching, she was reluctant to identify specific mistakes she made, but did point to a range of other factors contributing to her difficulties, from her gender to back-stabbing in her own caucus.

==== Education and labour ====
Some labour unions criticized the first budget, claiming that the Conservative government failed to honour a 2012 provincial election promises to continue increases to post-secondary education at a rate of 2%. Instead the budget was cut by 7.2%. On October 9, 2013, following 900 academic staff and faculty job losses across the province, Thomas Lukazuk, the Minister responsible for Advanced Education, announced $142.5 million had come available to construct a new Engineering building at University of Calgary. This figure was a controversial amount, close to the $147 million needed to reverse cuts 8 months before. The decision was also at odds with the government's written assurances to university administrators on July 3, 2013 that they would advocate to reverse the budget cuts if additional dollars became available: "Look guys, you're not happy, I'm not happy with this budget. But this is the reality ... The moment I have any extra dollars I can access, I'll be the first on my knees before the treasury board advocating for you to get your dollars. But in the meantime, get your financial houses in order," he said.

===== Bill 45 =====
However, in 2013, the Redford government tabled Bill 45 which increased fines for illegal strikes. Protests against Bill 45 came from the AUPE as well as the United Nurses of Alberta, Health Sciences Association of Alberta and Canadian Union of Provincial Employees-Alberta, representing 85,000 Albertans. Bill 45 imposes severe economic sanctions on provincial workers that strike. Those workers are already forbidden from striking as they are deemed "essential services." On March 20, 2015 it was reported that Bill 45 was being repealed. Premier Jim Prentice, Redford's successor, announced that "I don't agree with the content of the legislation and we will move forward and define essential service legislation that is as respectful of our employees as it is respectful of taxpayers." The AUPE felt that "'one of the most odious remnants of the Redford era' will be gone."

===== Bill 46 =====
The government also passed Bill 46: Public Service Salary Restraint Act which unilaterally stripped the union of its right to arbitration, a right previously granted by Premier Peter Lougheed. The AUPE launched a legal challenge against Bill 46, and two months later Court of Queen's Bench Justice Denny Thomas granted an indefinite injunction, saying that "the legislation could irreparably harm labour relations, guts the collective bargaining process and effectively emasculates the AUPE." Redford continued to defend the legislation and "reiterated the government's intent to appeal the judge's order." In the words of one observer, "the Redford government felt it was necessary to come down hard on them in order to snuff out any hope of wage increases that might add to the provincial budget deficit." Following Redford's resignation, the AUPE and the Hancock government reached a tentative agreement calling for an immediate $1800 lump sum for salaried employees (prorated for wage earners) and a pay increase of 6.75% to be spread over four years. The compensation deal proposed by the Redford government had been just 2% over four years and an $875 lump sum in 2014/15. The government dropped its appeal against the injunction after the deal with the AUPE was reached.

==== Energy ====
With Redford advocating for the oil industry and British Columbia premier Christy Clark in opposition, their relationship was described as "rocky." The main area of contention was a trans-provincial pipeline. Controversy and delays in approving the Keystone XL Pipeline focused attention on moving bitumen from Alberta to the west coast. Clark had initially demanded a share of royalties in exchange for granting access to build the Enbridge Northern Gateway Pipelines, prompting a "frosty" response from Redford in October 2012. In November 2013, a framework for a deal was worked out between the two leaders, with Redford's position on royalties remaining unchanged. One analyst remarked that the "public scuffle with British Columbia’s Premier, Christy Clark, over the Northern Gateway pipeline, was a first indication of unproductive handling" of energy issues by Redford's government. There was also an instability of appointments in the energy portfolios (including the removal of Ken Hughes as energy minister and the resignation of Kennedy-Glans as associate minister for electricity and renewable resources).

==== Handling of Mike Allen's sex scandal ====
On July 15, 2013, Fort McMurray-Wood Buffalo MLA Mike Allen was charged with soliciting prostitution during a government trip to St. Paul, Minnesota. The Human Trafficking Department of the St. Paul Police Department said Allen had responded to an ad posted by an undercover officer on Backpage. Allen resigned from the PC caucus when he was released from police custody the next morning, and sat in the Alberta Legislature as an independent MLA.

Redford could not call for Allen's resignation after he resigned from caucus, but was "shocked," "disappointed" and "disgusted" with "that MLA's conduct," and refused to mention Allen by name when she was asked about him by media. Wildrose Party leader Danielle Smith claimed to call for Allen's resignation so a byelection (in which her party had massive support) could be called. NDP Leader Brian Mason said Redford did not want to risk losing Allen's seat to an opposition party, and said she was hypocritical to condemn Allen's action but not call for a resignation.

=== Fulfilment of mandate ===
Many of the Redford government's decisions were reversed by career politician Premier Jim Prentice once he assumed office. When the 2014 fall legislative session was prorogued, two controversial bills died on the order paper (the Public Sector Pension Plans Amendment Act (Bill 9) and the Employment Pension (Private Sector) Plans Amendment Act (Bill 10)). The move satisfied the AUPE who had objected to these bills, in concert with Bills 45 and 46. The promise was also made not to re-introduce Bills 9 and 10. The following day, it was announced that Prentice would visit Michener Centre, a long term care center controversially marked for closure by the Redford government. Opposition parties had called on successive governments to keep the centre open. Many of Prentice's first actions in office were seen as an attempt to rehabilitate the Progressive Conservative Party in the eyes of the public. On March 20, 2015 Prentice announced that Bill 45 would be repealed, stating "I don't agree with the content of the legislation."

=== Controversy and resignation ===
In 2013, at the invitation of the Prime Minister Stephen Harper, Redford and numerous provincial premiers attended the funeral of Nelson Mandela, whom she worked with and for in the fight against Apartheid. Her attendance created a controversy when it was revealed the Alberta government covered the approximately $45,000 cost for her trip, including roughly $10,000 for a privately chartered flight to return to Alberta from South Africa for a swearing-in of the new Alberta Cabinet. Redford's travel further elicited disapproval from social media pundits when it was revealed that Redford's 12-year-old daughter and her friend had occasionally travelled with her mother on official government trips. In mid-March 2014, Redford repaid the costs of the Mandela funeral trip and apologized. It was reported in the press that the money was repaid only after weeks of refusals to do so, and Redford "only relented after tensions within her caucus spilled into the public realm."

The fallout over the Mandela funeral trip led to further scrutiny, with subsequent revelations of Redford's expenses to promote the province and questionable spending, while her government was making public service cuts. This led to some claiming abuse of power and a culture of entitlement. Critics also pointed out that Redford's staff had high salaries, including her chief of staff who earned more than his counterparts who worked for the Canadian Prime Minister or U.S. President. Further public allegations were that Redford's executive assistant charged $9,000 in lodging while working in Edmonton, averaging $200 a night for what the press referred to as "luxury hotel" stays.

Despite winning the party leadership and general election, some unions claimed that Redford did not fulfill campaign promises. At the same time, others complained that the province had an accumulated debt of $8.7-billion (the Canadian Taxpayers Federation projected that it would reach $17-billion by 2016), aided by changes to the accounting rules made in the 2013 budget.

As a result of these controversies, Redford's personal approval rating dropped to 18 per cent (the first sitting Alberta premier since Don Getty to have an approval rating below 20 per cent) and party support fell to 19 per cent, versus 46 per cent for opposition Wildrose. Backbencher Len Webber quit the Progressive Conservative caucus to sit as an independent, saying that Redford was a "not a nice woman" and a bully". Steve Robson, president of the PC association in the northeast Edmonton, described Redford as an "arrogant" leader who does not listen to her caucus and called on her to resign. During the weekend of March 15–16, 2014, Redford met the PC party executive in a closed-door meeting, where she faced a caucus revolt, with 10 MLAs announcing publicly their intention to meet on March 16 to debate whether to leave the PC party and sit as independents. On March 17, the rookie associate minister for electricity Donna Kennedy-Glans left the PC caucus. Later that week, some riding association presidents were preparing non-confidence motions in Redford's leadership.

On March 19, 2014, Redford announced she would resign as premier of Alberta, effective March 23, 2014. She was succeeded by deputy premier Dave Hancock as the interim party leader and premier until Jim Prentice was chosen as a successor at a leadership election, which was the Progressive Conservative Party's third contest in eight years. Redford announced her resignation as the MLA for Calgary-Elbow on August 6, one day before an Auditor General's report into her travel expenses was scheduled for release. On August 7, 2014 a report by the Auditor General of Alberta noted that as Premier she and her office had "used public resources inappropriately," "used public assets (aircraft) for personal and partisan purposes" and that Redford "was involved in a plan to convert public space in a public building into personal living space." The report concluded that these abuses arose due to an "aura of power around Premier Redford and her office and the perceptions that the influence of the office should not be questioned." The key findings included:

- The (Premier's) office did not comply with the expense policy because the staff responsible for approving expenses did not document their rationale for key decisions that impacted travel costs. These key decisions included the type and class of transportation used by and the standard of accommodation provided to Premier Redford and her office staff.
- The government does not require a premier to certify that costs incurred by a premier or on behalf of a premier are for government business and are a reasonable use of public resources.
- There was no formal oversight structure to monitor the office's travel expenses and use of government aircraft.
- Government aircraft policy was not followed. There was personal and partisan use of the aircraft by Premier Redford.

== Post-resignation MLA ==
=== Continuing financial controversy ===
Following Redford's resignation, further allegations of fiscal mis-management came to light.

==== Travel spending ====
Overspending on a trip to India was revealed, to the tune of $11,000, when members of Redford's "inner circle" flew on a trade mission to India then stopped over in the United Kingdom before a conference in Switzerland. Further scrutiny by media and opposition parties has led to a re-examination of fifty government flights in which Redford's daughter and her nanny) were accommodated, as well as two trips to the mountain resort of Jasper, Alberta. There was no official reply to repeated requests for information from both Redford and interim Premier Dave Hancock and, subsequently, no evidence to substantiate a claim that the Jasper trips were for government business. Even more documents released by the Auditor General of Alberta on July 29, 2014 suggested that Redford's staff falsified aircraft bookings in order that Redford could fly alone with her staff rather than permitting other government officials or passengers access to government planes.

==== Travel scout ====
On June 25, 2014, the CBC reported that even more documents had come to light revealing "hundreds of thousands" of dollars in additional travel-related expenses, including $330,000 for a civil servant a government employee Michele Tetreault who acted as a trip scout, including work on excursions the opposition criticized as "politicking at public expense." These expenses were never publicly disclosed nor proven. The Auditor General's report elaborated on the role of the trip scout, which was a new position created shortly after the 2012 election. The following year Tetreault's salary was listed as $127,827 annually. Among her duties was advance travel to locations the Premier was expected to visit, and emails released in the wake of the Auditor General's report reveal that among her activities she was "forwarding photos of hotels and suites, sussing out suitable patios and restaurants and at least once advising on public toilets." The position was cancelled after Redford's resignation as Premier, and Tetreault was reassigned within the government.

==== Skypalace ====
On March 28, 2014, it was reported that Redford had ordered a private penthouse for herself and her daughter in a government building close to the Legislature, to be constructed by the provincial government. The renovations became known as "Skypalace" in the press, and even though the contentious renovations were leaked to the media, they were apparently never cancelled. The total cost for the "Skypalace" is an estimated $2.76 million.

==== Personal staff ====
The cost incurred by the severance packages of her personal support staff also drew criticism. According to the terms of the contracts they were engaged under, her chief of staff, communications director and other "senior staffers" became entitled to receive a total of over 1 million dollars in severance benefits. Additional payouts to staff and executive council accounted for an additional 1.3 million dollars. In May 2014 it was revealed that Redford was assigned a personal protective security detail from the Calgary Police Service, at a forecast of $1.8M over budget. Her predecessor, Ed Stelmach, was protected by seven provincial sheriffs. Heavily redacted documents obtained by the media gave no evidence as to what rationale Redford had for the additional security detail, which provided security to Redford and her family in Calgary, Canmore and Banff.

==== Audit of travel expenses ====
After concerns regarding the permier's office travel and expense claims came to light, Premier Redford herself requested a full audit by the Auditor General. On August 7, 2014, the Auditor General tabled its report, concluding that Redford and her office had "used public resources inappropriately," "used public assets (aircraft) for personal and partisan purposes" and that Redford "was involved in a plan to convert public space in a public building into personal living space." The report concluded that these abuses arose due to an "aura of power around Premier Redford and her office and the perceptions that the influence of the office should not be questioned."

=== Attendance in the legislature ===
Following her resignation as Premier, Redford did not return to her seat in the Legislature. According to Section 34 of the Legislative Assembly Act. Redford's extended absence caused speculation when no official statement was forthcoming from the interim Premier as to her whereabouts or reasons for not attending. Speculation was heightened further when Redford was spotted in the resort town of Palm Springs, California during her absence. It was later revealed that Redford had, in fact, served official notice to the speaker and that her absence would continue, though "the reason for her excuse is confidential." In declaring her absence to the speaker, Redford ensured she would not be docked pay for non-attendance in the Legislature, whose rules state that a token deduction of $100 a day would be levied for each day missed, after the first 10 consecutive days absent. Redford returned to the legislature on May 5, 2014. In response to a media scrum, she noted that she spent the time off with family in Palm Springs but also worked in her constituency, as her intention was to complete her term as the MLA for Calgary-Elbow. On August 6, 2014, she resigned her seat in the legislature in order to "start the next chapter of my life." In a public statement published in the Calgary Herald and Edmonton Journal she recognized "that mistakes were made along the way" and accepted responsibility for her decisions. She added that she and her family will continue to live in Alberta and that she plans to teach as well as resume her work in international development and public policy.

=== Standing in the party and resignation ===
Redford returned to the Legislature and the back benches on May 5, 2014. Redford retired from politics on August 6, 2014. Redford's resignation was tendered in the form of a letter published in Edmonton and Calgary newspapers on May 30, 2014.

=== Independent Ethics Commissioner finds CBC accusations of Conflict of Interest Unfounded ===
In November 2015, the CBC claimed that an investigation into the process with which Alberta chose a legal consortium for a $10-billion lawsuit against the tobacco industry was "manipulated, allowing former premier Alison Redford the opportunity to select a consortium with close personal and political ties". T On April 3, 2017, Paul Fraser, British Columbia's acting ethics commissioner, concluded that Alison Redford did not break Alberta's Conflict of Interest Act. Fraser noted, "In making the choice of counsel in the tobacco litigation, she used sensible and principled reasoning, based on cogent information she received in the briefing note from government officials and that she had collected in the course of her active tenure as Minister of Justice and Attorney General."

=== Policy advisor in Afghanistan ===
In November 2017, Redford took a position as a policy advisor in Kabul to the government of Afghanistan to help reform its Ministry of Mines and Petroleum and help the country develop its natural resources. The position was developed as part of a partnership between the Afghan government and the World Bank. Redford said that her priorities were restoring the power grid and attracting international investment.

== Personal life ==
In July 2015, Redford revealed that following her resignation, she no longer belongs to any political party.

== Election results ==
2012 Alberta general election: Calgary-Elbow
Party	Candidate	Votes	%	±%
Progressive Conservative	Alison Redford	11,198	58.09	+16.01
Wildrose	James Cole	5,509	28.58	+21.97
Liberal	Beena Ashar	1,067	5.53	−33.67
New Democratic	Craig Coolahan	761	3.95	+1.96
Alberta Party	Greg Clark	518	2.69	–
Evergreen	William Hamilton	225	1.17	−2.44
Total valid votes		19,278	100.00	–
Total rejected ballots		257	–	–
Turnout		19,535	58.44	+12.60
Eligible voters		33,430	–	–

2008 Alberta general election: Calgary-Elbow
Party	Candidate	Votes	%	±%
Progressive Conservative	Alison Redford	6,130	42.08	+3.75
Liberal	Craig Cheffins	5,711	39.20	−6.57
Wildrose Alliance	Dale Nelson	963	6.61	+2.44
Independent	Barry Erskine	948	6.51	
Green	Jonathon Sheffield	526	3.61	−1.99
New Democratic	Garnet Wilcox	290	1.99	−1.31
Total valid votes		14,568	100.00	
Total rejected ballots		77		
Turnout		14,645	45.84	
Eligible voters		31,947		
Progressive Conservative gain from Liberal		Swing		+5.16%

== Tribute ==
In 2016, Redford's official portrait was unveiled; it has been added to the collection which is permanently displayed in the Alberta Legislature Building.

Order of precedence
Preceded by Ed Stelmach, former premier	Order of precedence in Alberta as of 2014	Succeeded by Dave Hancock, former premier
