= Doug Schweitzer =

Canadian lawyer and politician

The Honourable Doug Schweitzer ECA
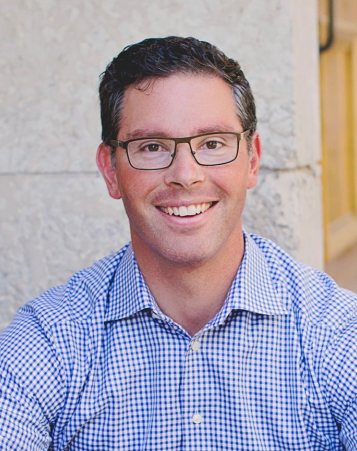
- Schweitzer in 2017

Minister of Jobs, Economy and Innovation
- In office August 25, 2020 – August 5, 2022
- Premier: Jason Kenney
- Preceded by: Tanya Fir
- Succeeded by: Tanya Fir

Minister of Justice and Solicitor General of Alberta
- In office April 30, 2019 – August 25, 2020
- Premier: Jason Kenney
- Preceded by: Kathleen Ganley
- Succeeded by: Kaycee Madu

Member of the Legislative Assembly of Alberta for Calgary-Elbow
- In office April 16, 2019 – August 31, 2022
- Preceded by: Greg Clark
- Succeeded by: Samir Kayande

Personal details
- Born: 1978 or 1979 (age 47–48) Kelowna, British Columbia, Canada
- Party: United Conservative Party
- Education: University of Manitoba
- Occupation: Lawyer

Douglas Edward Schweitzer (born 1978 or 1979) is a Canadian lawyer and politician who was elected in the 2019 Alberta general election to represent the electoral district of Calgary-Elbow in the 30th Alberta Legislature. He is a member of the United Conservative Party.

== Biography ==
He was born in Kelowna, British Columbia. Schweitzer ran unsuccessfully for the 2017 United Conservative Party leadership election.

On April 30, 2019, he was appointed to be the Ministry of Justice and Solicitor General of Alberta in the Executive Council of Alberta, and held that role until August 25, 2020, when he was shuffled to the new ministry of Jobs, Economy and Innovation. After announcing his intention not to run for re-election in May 2023, Schweitzer resigned as Minister of Jobs, Economy and Innovation and announced he would be resigning his seat in the Legislative Assembly of Alberta on August 5, 2022. On September 7, 2022, Schweitzer announced he had joined Deloitte as a senior advisor. In the 2023 Alberta general election, his former seat was taken by Samir Kayande from the NDP. This was the first time that the NDP had won Calgary Elbow.

== Electoral history ==
2019 Alberta general election: Calgary-Elbow
Party	Candidate	Votes	%	±%	Expenditures
United Conservative	Doug Schweitzer	10,951	44.34	+5.03	$309,597
Alberta Party	Greg Clark	7,542	30.54	-9.73	$70,288
New Democratic	Janet Eremenko	5,796	23.47	+7.17	$44,092
Liberal	Robin Mackintosh	275	1.11	-2.61	$500
Green	Quinn Rupert	132	0.53	+0.45	$500
Total		24,696	98.36	–	
Rejected, spoiled and declined		413	1.64		
Turnout		25,109	71.88		
Eligible voters		34,934			
United Conservative gain from Alberta Party		Swing		+7.38	
Source(s) Source: Elections Alberta Note: Expenses is the sum of "Election Expenses", "Other Expenses" and "Transfers Issued". The Elections Act limits "Election Expenses" to $50,000.

Winnipeg Centre

2004 Canadian federal election: Winnipeg Centre
Party	Candidate	Votes	%	±%	Expenditures
New Democratic	Pat Martin	12,149	45.4	+4.1	$51,914
Liberal	David Northcott	9,285	34.7	+0.6	$67,134
Conservative	Robert Eng	3,631	13.6	-8.0	$7,572
Green	Robin (Pilar) Faye	1,151	4.3	+1.7	$2,087
Marijuana	John M. Siedleski	346	1.3	–	–
Communist	Anna-Celestrya Carr	114	0.4	-0.1	$654
Independent	Douglas Edward Schweitzer	92	0.3	–	–
Total valid votes		26,768	100.0		–
Total rejected ballots		188	0.7		
Turnout		26,956	45.1		

Note: Conservative vote is compared to the total of the Canadian Alliance vote and Progressive Conservative vote in 2000 election.

Alberta provincial government of Jason Kenney
Cabinet posts (2)
Predecessor	Office	Successor
Tanya Fir	Minister of Jobs, Economy and Innovation; August 25, 2020–	Incumbent
Kathleen Ganley	Minister of Justice and Solcitor General; April 30, 2019–August 25, 2020	Kaycee Madu
