= Gordon Dirks =

Canadian educator and politician

The Honourable Gordon Dirks ECA

Member of the Legislative Assembly of Alberta for Calgary-Elbow
- In office October 27, 2014 – May 5, 2015
- Preceded by: Alison Redford
- Succeeded by: Greg Clark

Alberta Minister of Education
- In office September 15, 2014 – May 24, 2015
- Premier: Jim Prentice
- Preceded by: Jeff Johnson
- Succeeded by: David Eggen

Member of the Legislative Assembly of Saskatchewan for Regina Rosemont
- In office May 8, 1982 – November 12, 1986
- Preceded by: Bill Allen
- Succeeded by: Robert Lyons

Personal details
- Born: Gordon Edwin Dirks; June 22, 1947 (age 78) Saskatoon, Saskatchewan, Canada
- Party: PC Alberta
- Other political affiliations: PC Saskatchewan
- Occupation: Pastor, educator

Gordon Edwin Dirks ECA (born June 22, 1947) is a Canadian educator and politician, who has held political office in the provinces of Saskatchewan and Alberta.

== Life and career ==
Dirks was born in Saskatoon in 1947, and studied at the University of Saskatchewan, receiving a BEd degree. Dirks went on to earn a diploma in educational administration and a MEd from the University of Regina and continued his studies at the Canadian Bible College and Theological Seminary in Regina. He taught school, served as public school principal and was registrar for the Canadian Bible College from 1979 to 1982. In 1971, he married Evangeline Joy Reid.

Dirks represented Regina Rosemont from 1982 to 1986 in the Legislative Assembly of Saskatchewan as a Progressive Conservative member. Dirks served in the Saskatchewan cabinet as Minister of Social Services and as Minister of Urban Affairs. He was defeated by Robert Lyons when he ran for reelection to the assembly in 1986.

From 1986 to 1990, he served as vice-president for the Canadian Bible College, which relocated to Calgary in 2000 as Alliance University College, later becoming Ambrose University College (AUC) as the result of a merger. Dirks was a mayoral candidate in Regina's municipal election in 1988, which was won by Doug Archer. In 1990, Dirks became assistant deputy minister for corporate services with the Alberta Ministry of Family and Social Services, moving to Edmonton. From 1993 to 1996, he served as executive administrator for Beulah Alliance Church in Edmonton and between 1996 and 2006, Dirks served as president of Rocky Mountain College in Calgary.

In 1999, Dirks was elected as trustee for Wards 1 and 2 on the Calgary Board of Education. in a by-election, following the dismissal of the Board by then-Education Minister Lyle Oberg. Dirks ran on a platform to streamline administrative costs provide more support for teachers and ensure reasonable local school fees. In 2000, as a staunch supporter of diversity and parental choice in the public education system, Dirks put forward a motion to accept plans for alternative schools within the CBE. The alternative program policy passed in June 2001. In October 2002, Dirks became chair of the CBE, serving four terms until he retired in 2010.

In 2006, Dirks rejoined AUC as its vice-president of external relations, a position he held until 2010. Between 2010 and 2014 Dirks was the executive pastor of the Centre Street Church in Calgary.

On September 15, 2014, he was appointed to the cabinet of Alberta premier Jim Prentice as Minister of Education, despite not holding a seat in the Legislative Assembly of Alberta. He was subsequently named as the party's candidate in a by-election in Calgary-Elbow, the seat formerly held by Alison Redford. The by-election was scheduled for October 27, 2014, and Dirks won the by-election.

As chairman of the Council of Ministers of Education, Canada, an ex-officio post he inherited along with the political post, Dirks championed the Pan-Canadian Assessment Program, a test of more than 32,000 Grade 8 students from across the country in 2013.

Shortly after Dirks' appointment, concerns were raised regarding Dirks's religious views and how they may impact LGBTQ students in Alberta because of his previous role as executive pastor at Calgary's Centre Street Church. The church's statement of theological principles and ministry practices states that the church believes "God is dishonoured by ... sexual activity between persons of the same sex." However, in a written statement to counter concerns, Dirks writes: "I believe everyone has the right to be respected and treated with honour and dignity … I am committed to ensuring every child in Alberta’s schools has a safe, caring and respectful learning environment."

Dirks was defeated in the 2015 provincial election by Greg Clark of the Alberta Party. The National Post later criticized Prentice for putting Dirks in "one of the reddest of the Red Tory ridings in Calgary".

== Electoral record ==
Alberta provincial by-election, October 27, 2014: Calgary-Elbow
Party	Candidate	Votes	%	±%
Progressive Conservative	Gordon Dirks	4,207	33.21	-24.88
Alberta Party	Greg Clark	3,412	26.94	+24.25
Wildrose	John Fletcher	3,056	24.13	-4.45
Liberal	Susan Wright	1,519	11.99	+6.46
New Democratic	Stephanie McLean	472	3.73	-0.22
Total valid votes		––,–––	100.00	–
Total rejected ballots		–	–	–
Turnout		––,–––	––.––	–
Eligible voters		––,–––	–	–

2015 Alberta general election: Calgary-Elbow
Party	Candidate	Votes	%	±%
Alberta Party	Greg Clark	8,707	42.20%	15.32%
Progressive Conservative	Gordon Edwin Dirks	6,254	30.31%	-2.91%
New Democratic	Catherine Welburn	3,256	15.78%	12.06%
Wildrose	Megan Brown	1,786	8.66%	-15.50%
Liberal	John Roggeveen	565	2.74%	-9.28%
Social Credit	Larry R. Heather	67	0.32%	–
Total		20,635	–	–
Rejected, spoiled and declined		43	43	15
Eligible electors / turnout		34,681	59.67%	22.51%
Alberta Party gain from Progressive Conservative		Swing		-8.81%
Source(s) Source: "09 - Calgary-Elbow, 2015 Alberta general election". officialresults.elections.ab.ca. Elections Alberta. Chief Electoral Officer (2016). 2015 General Election. A Report of the Chief Electoral Officer (PDF) (Report). Edmonton, Alta.: Elections Alberta. pp. 121–124.
