= Calgary Victoria Park =

Defunct provincial electoral district in Alberta, Canada

Coordinates: 51.04°N 114.08°W

Alberta electoral district

Defunct provincial electoral district
- Legislature: Legislative Assembly of Alberta
- District created: 1967
- District abolished: 1970
- First contested: 1967
- Last contested: 1967

Calgary Victoria Park was a provincial electoral district in Calgary, Alberta, Canada, mandated to return a single member to the Legislative Assembly of Alberta using the first past the post method of voting from 1967 to 1971.

The riding existed for four years and would be contested once for the 1967 election. After which the Alberta Legislature passed the 1970 An Act to amend The Election Act and The Legislative Assembly Act to redraw provincial electoral districts. Calgary Centre and Calgary Victoria Park were split between Calgary-Buffalo, Calgary-Mountain View, Calgary-Bow, Calgary-Millican, and Calgary-North Hill.

The riding was named after the community of Victoria Park.

== Election results 1967 ==
1967 Alberta general election
| Party | Candidate | Votes | % |
|---|---|---|---|
| Progressive Conservative | David John Russell | 4,796 | 43.33% |
| Social Credit | Art Davis | 3,956 | 35.74% |
| New Democratic | Ted Takacs | 1,229 | 11.10% |
| Liberal | Reginald J. Gibbs | 1,088 | 9.83% |
| Total | | 11,069 | – |
| Rejected, spoiled and declined | | 78 | – |
| Eligible electors / turnout | | 17,982 | 61.99% |
Source(s) Source: "Calgary-Victoria Park Official Results 1967 Alberta general election". Alberta Heritage Community Foundation.

== See also ==
- List of Alberta provincial electoral districts
- Canadian provincial electoral districts
