= Greg Clark (Canadian politician) =

Canadian politician from Alberta

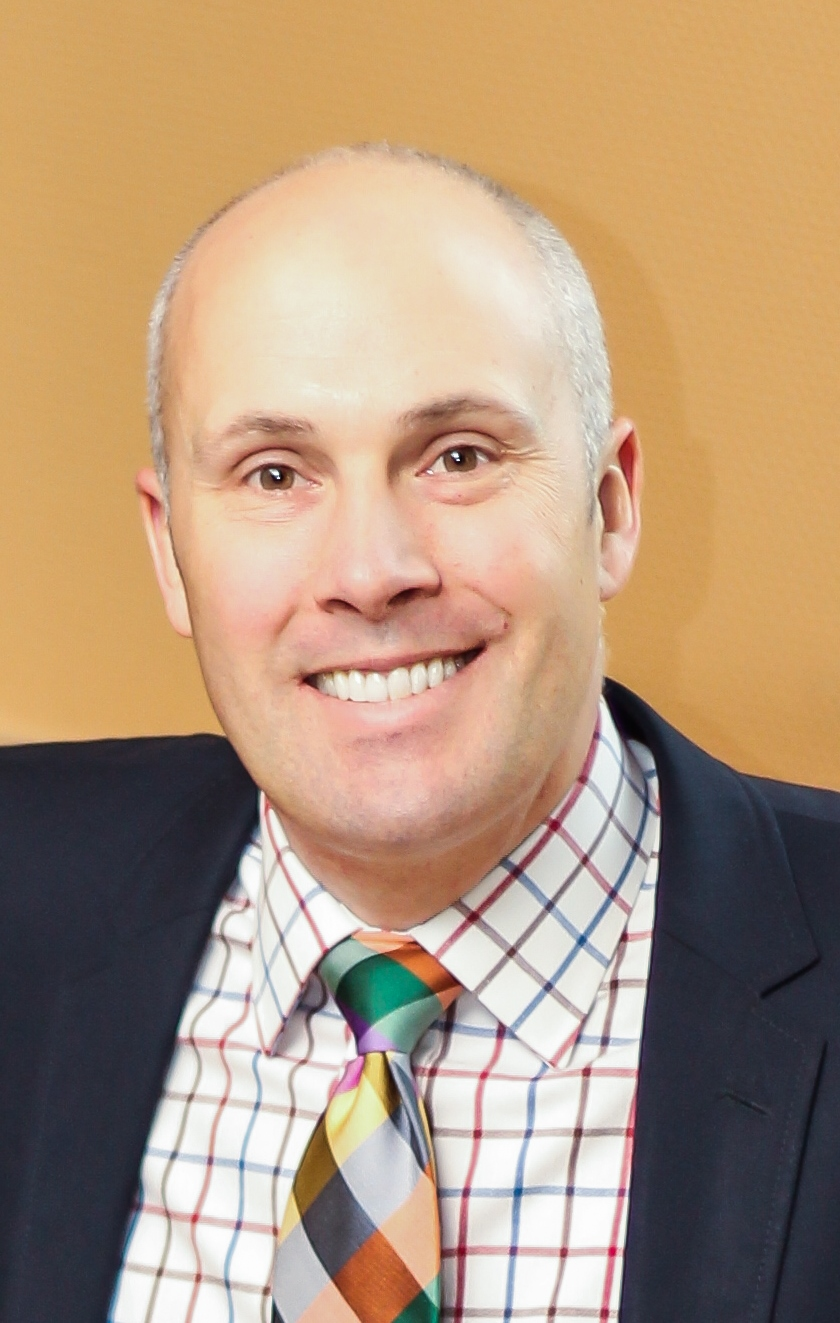

Leader of the Alberta Party
- In office September 21, 2013 – February 27, 2018
- Preceded by: Glenn Taylor
- Succeeded by: Stephen Mandel

Member of the Legislative Assembly of Alberta for Calgary-Elbow
- In office May 5, 2015 – April 16, 2019
- Preceded by: Gordon Dirks
- Succeeded by: Doug Schweitzer

Personal details
- Born: Gregory Clark Calgary, Alberta, Canada
- Party: Alberta Party
- Occupation: Entrepreneur

Gregory Jamieson Clark is a former Canadian politician from Alberta. He is the former leader of the Alberta Party, and in the 2015 Alberta general election was elected the party's sole Member of the Legislative Assembly, representing Calgary-Elbow. Clark resigned as leader on November 18, 2017, and served as interim leader until the leadership election when Stephen Mandel was elected the new leader of the party.

== Biography ==
Clark was born and raised in Calgary, Alberta. He graduated in 1993 from the University of Victoria with a degree in Political Science, minoring in Sociology and holds an MBA from Royal Roads University, graduating in 2005. He returned to Alberta to work for Laurence Decore, who was then leader of the Official Opposition Alberta Liberals.

Clark earned an MBA and in 2006 co-founded an Information Technology consulting firm C3 Associates. The firm earned a distinction as one of Alberta Venture's 50 fast-growth companies in 2011 and 2012. C3 Associates was also named one of Canada's top 250 information technology companies by the Branham Group in 2012 and 2013. In 2015, Mr. Clark was named one of Alberta's 50 Most Influential by Alberta Venture Magazine. He has engaged in volunteer work, most notably as Vice Chair of Distress Centre Calgary, and he co-founded the Calgary River Communities Action Group in response to the 2013 Alberta floods.

In 2013, Clark sold his share of C3 to his partners to enter politics full-time.

== Political career ==
Clark was the Alberta Party's election candidate in Calgary-Elbow for the 2012 Alberta general election, placing 5th. Following the resignation of Glenn Taylor, the Alberta Party remained without a leader for some months. On May 29, 2013, the party announced that it would hold a leadership vote to coincide with its Annual General Meeting on September 21, 2013 in Edmonton. Clark won the election, receiving 87% of the 337 votes cast.

He was elected as the Member of the Legislative Assembly of Alberta for Calgary-Elbow on May 5, 2015. He served on the Standing Committee for Resource Stewardship and was a member of the Select Special Ethics and Accountability Committee.

Despite becoming the first Alberta Party candidate to win a seat in the Alberta legislature and growing the caucus to two by attracting an NDP MLA to cross the floor, Clark resigned as leader in November 2017 after being reportedly pressured by the party's board of directors to do so in order to renew the party through a leadership election. His resignation occurred months after the merger of the Progressive Conservative and Wildrose parties in to the United Conservative Party which, in turn, resulted in large numbers of disaffected former Progressive Conservatives to join the Alberta Party and, allegedly, try to remould it in their image. Though he initially considered standing in the new leadership election, Clark announced on December 14, 2017, that he would not be a candidate for the leadership though he intends to remain an Alberta Party MLA and run for re-election to the legislature in the 2019 provincial election.

== Post-politics ==
In 2019, Clark was appointed chair of the Alberta Balancing Pool. Clark was also appointed the chair of the Calgary Metropolitan Region Board. In 2025, Clark was selected by the NDP Opposition as a commissioner for the provincial electoral boundaries readjustment.

== Election results ==
2012 Alberta general election: Calgary-Elbow
Party	Candidate	Votes	%	±%
Progressive Conservative	Alison Redford	11,198	58.09	+16.01
Wildrose	James Cole	5,509	28.58	+21.97
Liberal	Beena Ashar	1,067	5.53	−33.67
New Democratic	Craig Coolahan	761	3.95	+1.96
Alberta Party	Greg Clark	518	2.69	–
Evergreen	William Hamilton	225	1.17	−2.44
Total valid votes		19,278	100.00	–
Total rejected ballots		257	–	–
Turnout		19,535	58.44	+12.60
Eligible voters		33,430	–	–

Alberta provincial by-election, October 27, 2014: Calgary-Elbow
Party	Candidate	Votes	%	±%
Progressive Conservative	Gordon Dirks	4,207	33.21%	-24.88
Alberta Party	Greg Clark	3,412	26.94%	+24.25
Wildrose	John Fletcher	3,056	24.13%	-4.45
Liberal	Susan Wright	1,519	11.99%	+6.46
New Democratic	Stephanie McLean	472	3.73%	-0.22
Total valid votes		––,–––	100.00	–
Total rejected ballots		–	–	–
Turnout		––,–––	––.––	–
Eligible voters		––,–––	–	–

2015 Alberta general election: Calgary-Elbow
Party	Candidate	Votes	%	±%
Alberta Party	Greg Clark	8,707	42.20%	15.32%
Progressive Conservative	Gordon Edwin Dirks	6,254	30.31%	-2.91%
New Democratic	Catherine Welburn	3,256	15.78%	12.06%
Wildrose	Megan Brown	1,786	8.66%	-15.50%
Liberal	John Roggeveen	565	2.74%	-9.28%
Social Credit	Larry R. Heather	67	0.32%	–
Total		20,635	–	–
Rejected, spoiled and declined		43	43	15
Eligible electors / turnout		34,681	59.67%	22.51%
Alberta Party gain from Progressive Conservative		Swing		-8.81%
Source(s) Source: "09 - Calgary-Elbow, 2015 Alberta general election". officialresults.elections.ab.ca. Elections Alberta. Chief Electoral Officer (2016). 2015 General Election. A Report of the Chief Electoral Officer (PDF) (Report). Edmonton, Alta.: Elections Alberta. pp. 121–124.

2019 Alberta general election: Calgary-Elbow
Party	Candidate	Votes	%	±%	Expenditures
United Conservative	Doug Schweitzer	10,951	44.34	+5.03	$309,597
Alberta Party	Greg Clark	7,542	30.54	-9.73	$70,288
New Democratic	Janet Eremenko	5,796	23.47	+7.17	$44,092
Liberal	Robin Mackintosh	275	1.11	-2.61	$500
Green	Quinn Rupert	132	0.53	+0.45	$500
Total		24,696	98.36	–	
Rejected, spoiled and declined		413	1.64		
Turnout		25,109	71.88		
Eligible voters		34,934			
United Conservative gain from Alberta Party		Swing		+7.38	
Source(s) Source: Elections Alberta Note: Expenses is the sum of "Election Expenses", "Other Expenses" and "Transfers Issued". The Elections Act limits "Election Expenses" to $50,000.
