= Calgary-Shaw =

Provincial electoral district in Alberta, Canada

Coordinates: 50.90°N 114.06°W

Alberta electoral district
- Calgary-Shaw within the City of Calgary, 2017 boundaries

Provincial electoral district
- Legislature: Legislative Assembly of Alberta
MLA
Kyle Campbell
New Democratic
- District created: 1986
- First contested: 1986
- Last contested: 2026

Demographics
- Census division: Division No. 6
- Census subdivision: Calgary

Calgary-Shaw is a provincial electoral district in Alberta, Canada. The district is one of 87 current districts mandated to return a single member to the Legislative Assembly of Alberta using the first past the post method of voting.

This urban riding was created from parts of Calgary-Fish Creek, Calgary-Glenmore and Banff-Cochrane in the 1986 boundary redistribution. It covers the central southern portion of city of Calgary, and has seen its borders change numerous times since it was created. The riding in its current boundaries contains the neighbourhoods of Shawnessy, Somerset, Silverado, Yorkville, Belmont, Pine Creek, Chaparral, Walden, Wolf Willow, and Legacy.

The riding was named after former Liberal leader Joseph Tweed Shaw.

== History ==
The electoral district was created in the 1986 boundary redistribution from the south end of Calgary-Glenmore and the west half of Calgary-Fish Creek. Over the years the riding boundaries have caused the riding to shift southward from its original boundaries.

The 2003 boundary redistribution caused the riding to be split east of the Bow River into the electoral district of Calgary-Hays.

The 2010 boundary redistribution saw all land south of Alberta Highway 22X move into the electoral district of Calgary-South East. The west boundaries with Calgary-Lougheed were altered in the northwest corner to gain land in the community of Millrise and the Shawnee Slopes golf course from Lougheed.

=== Boundary history ===
22 Calgary-Shaw 2003 boundaries
Bordering districts
North	East	West	South
Calgary-Fish Creek	Calgary-Hays	Calgary-Lougheed	Highwood and Foothills-Rocky View
riding map goes here			
Legal description from the Statutes of Alberta 2003, Electoral Divisions Act.
Starting at the intersection of Macleod Trail S with Fish Creek; then 1. southeast along Fish Creek to the right bank of the Bow River; 2. generally southeast along the right bank of the Bow River to the south Calgary city boundary; 3. west and north along the city boundary to 14 Street SW; 4. north along 14 Street SW and James McKevitt Road SW to Shawnessy Boulevard SW; 5. east along Shawnessy Boulevard SW to Macleod Trail S; 6. north along Macleod Trail S to the starting point.
Note:

24 Calgary-Shaw 2010 boundaries
Bordering districts
North	East	West	South
Calgary-Fish Creek	Calgary-Hays	Calgary-South East	Calgary-Lougheed
Legal description from the Statutes of Alberta 2010, Electoral Divisions Act.

=== Representation history ===
Members of the Legislative Assembly for Calgary-Shaw
Assembly	Years	Member	Party
See: Calgary-Fish Creek 1979-1986, Calgary-Glenmore 1959-1986 and Banff-Cochrane
21st	1986–1989	Jim Dinning	Progressive Conservative
22nd	1989–1993	Jim Dinning	Progressive Conservative
23rd	1993–1997	Jon Havelock	Progressive Conservative
24th	1997–2001	Jon Havelock	Progressive Conservative
25th	2001–2004	Cindy Ady	Progressive Conservative
26th	2004–2008	Cindy Ady	Progressive Conservative
27th	2008–2012	Cindy Ady	Progressive Conservative
28th	2012–2014	Jeff Wilson	Wildrose
28th	2014–2015	Jeff Wilson	Progressive Conservative
29th	2015–2019	Graham Sucha	New Democratic
30th	2019–2023	Rebecca Schulz	United Conservative
31st	2023–2026	Rebecca Schulz	United Conservative
31st	2026–2026	Vacant	Vacant
31st	2026–Present	Kyle Campbell	New Democratic

The electoral district was created in the 1986 boundary redistribution. The election that year saw Progressive Conservative candidate Jim Dinning win with a landslide majority. He ran for a second term in the 1989 general election and won a bigger popular vote but his percentage decreased.

The 1993 boundary redistribution changed the boundaries for Calgary-Shaw. Dinning ran in the new electoral district of Calgary-Lougheed for the 1993 election and won. The election in this district saw former Calgary alderman Jon Havelock run as the Progressive Conservative candidate and win a landslide. He won his second term in the 1997 general election with an even bigger landslide taking 78% of the popular vote. He retired from provincial office at dissolution of the legislature in 2001.

The 2001 general election saw Progressive Conservative candidate Cindy Ady win the largest majority in Alberta history. She became the first candidate to top 20,000 votes and took over 80%. She ran for a second term in office in the 2004 general election. She lost almost 14,000 voters from 2001 but still took the district with 63%.

Premier Ed Stelmach appointed Ady in 2007 to the cabinet with the junior portfolio of Associate Minister of Tourism Promotion. She was promoted to be a full minister in 2008. Ady was re-elected to her third term in the 2008 general election taking just over half the popular vote.

In the 2012 general election Jeff Wilson of the Wildrose Party was elected. In 2014 Jeff Wilson left the Wildrose Party and crossed the floor of the Alberta Legislature to sit with the Progressive Conservative Party.

In the 2015 general election Graham Sucha of the New Democratic Party was elected with 31% of the vote.

== Legislative election results ==
=== Elections in the 2020s ===
Alberta provincial by-election, 2026 Resignation of Rebecca Schulz
** Preliminary results — Not yet official **
Party	Candidate	Votes	%	±%
New Democratic	Kyle Campbell	7,461	46.63	+3.91
United Conservative	Mike Derry	6,879	42.99	-13.35
Progressive Tory	Kyle Joseph	978	6.11	—
Liberal	John Roggeveen	602	3.76	—
Independent	Rolly Ashdown	82	0.51	—
Total valid votes		16,002		
Total rejected ballots				
Turnout				
Eligible voters				
New Democratic gain from United Conservative		Swing		+8.63

2023 Alberta general election
Party	Candidate	Votes	%	±%
United Conservative	Rebecca Schulz	13,970	56.34	-8.98
New Democratic	David Cloutier	10,591	42.71	+17.09
Solidarity Movement	Pietro Cervo	236	0.95	–
Total		24,797	98.86	–
Rejected, declined and spoiled		287	1.14	+0.30
Turnout		25,084	63.56	-4.83
Eligible voters		39,464		
United Conservative hold		Swing		-13.03
Source(s) Source: Elections Alberta

=== Elections in the 2010s ===
2019 Alberta general election
Party	Candidate	Votes	%	±%
United Conservative	Rebecca Schulz	14,261	65.32	+3.75
New Democratic	Graham Sucha	5,594	25.62	-5.95
Alberta Party	Bronson Ha	1,331	6.10	+4.72
Liberal	Vesna Samardzija	290	1.33	-3.30
Green	John Daly	212	0.97	+0.12
Alberta Independence	Jarek Bucholc	146	0.67	–
Total		21,834	99.16	–
Rejected, spoiled and declined		186	0.84	
Turnout		22,020	68.39	
Eligible voters		32,198		
United Conservative notional hold		Swing		+4.85
Source(s) Source: "2019 Provincial General Election Report" (PDF). Elections Alberta.

Redistributed results, 2015 Alberta election
Party	Votes	%
Progressive Conservative	4,518	31.95
New Democratic	4,465	31.57
Wildrose	4,188	29.62
Liberal	654	4.62
Alberta Party	195	1.38
Green	121	0.86

2015 Alberta general election
Party	Candidate	Votes	%	±%
New Democratic	Graham Sucha	5,449	31.27%	27.59%
Progressive Conservative	Jeff Wilson	5,348	30.69%	-11.45%
Wildrose	Brad Leishman	5,301	30.42%	-14.79%
Liberal	Alexander Barrow	668	3.83%	-3.08%
Alberta Party	Evert Smith	661	3.79%	1.72%
Total		17,427	–	–
Rejected, spoiled and declined		64	22	11
Eligible electors / turnout		30,458	57.46%	3.10%
New Democratic gain from Wildrose		Swing		-1.25%
Source(s) Source: "24 - Calgary-Shaw, 2015 Alberta general election". officialresults.elections.ab.ca. Elections Alberta.

2012 Alberta general election
Party	Candidate	Votes	%	±%
Wildrose	Jeff Wilson	7,365	45.21%	34.70%
Progressive Conservative	Farouk Adatia	6,864	42.13%	-15.99%
Liberal	John Roggeveen	1,126	6.91%	-17.61%
New Democratic	Ashley Fairall	599	3.68%	0.91%
Alberta Party	Brandon Beasley	337	2.07%	–
Total		16,291	–	–
Rejected, spoiled and declined		104	43	13
Eligible electors / turnout		30,185	54.36%	14.55%
Wildrose gain from Progressive Conservative		Swing		-15.26%
Source(s) Source: "24 - Calgary-Shaw, 2012 Alberta general election". officialresults.elections.ab.ca. Elections Alberta.

=== Elections in the 2000s ===
2008 Alberta general election
Party	Candidate	Votes	%	±%
Progressive Conservative	Cindy Ady	7,010	58.12	-5.32
Liberal	John Roggeveen	2,958	24.53	+1.82
Wildrose	Richard P. Dur	1,268	10.51	+4.67
Green	Jennifer Saunders	491	4.07	+0.48
New Democratic	Jenn Carlson	334	2.77	-0.06
Total		12,061	99.41	–
Rejected, spoiled and declined		72	0.59	-0.18
Turnout		12,133	36.40	-4.11
Eligible voters		33,332		
Progressive Conservative hold		Swing		-3.57
Source(s) Source: "2008 Provincial General Election Report" (PDF). Elections Alberta.

2004 Alberta general election
Party	Candidate	Votes	%	±%
Progressive Conservative	Cindy Ady	6,735	63.44	-17.28
Liberal	John Roggeveen	2,410	22.70	+8.41
Alberta Alliance	Barry Chase	620	5.84	–
Green	Rick Papineau	381	3.59	–
New Democratic	Jarrett Young	300	2.83	-0.07
Separation	Daniel W. Doherty	170	1.60	+0.72
Total		10,616	99.22	–
Rejected, spoiled and declined		83	0.78	+0.56
Turnout		10,699	40.51	-10.56
Eligible voters		26,408		
Progressive Conservative hold		Swing		-12.84
Source(s) Source: "2004 Provincial General Election Report" (PDF). Elections Alberta.

2001 Alberta general election
Party	Candidate	Votes	%	±%
Progressive Conservative	Cindy Ady	20,306	80.72	+5.43
Liberal	Jim McPherson	3,595	14.29	-3.21
New Democratic	Ryan Falkenberg	729	2.90	-0.07
Alberta First	Peter Singleton	222	0.88	–
Independent	Kevin Agar	153	0.61	–
Independent	Darren Popik	151	0.60	–
Total		25,156	99.78	–
Rejected, spoiled and declined		55	0.22	-0.01
Turnout		25,211	51.07	+1.60
Eligible voters		49,366		
Progressive Conservative hold		Swing		+4.32
Source(s) Source: "2001 Provincial General Election Report" (PDF). Elections Alberta.

=== Elections in the 1990s ===
1997 Alberta general election
Party	Candidate	Votes	%	±%
Progressive Conservative	Jonathan Niles Havelock	12,304	75.29	+12.91
Liberal	Sharon L. Howe	2,860	17.50	-15.69
Social Credit	Michael Roth	624	3.82	–
New Democratic	Shawn Keown	485	2.97	-0.55
Natural Law	Almas Walden	69	0.42	-0.49
Total		16,342	99.77	–
Rejected, spoiled and declined		37	0.23	-0.01
Turnout		16,379	49.47	-13.13
Eligible voters		33,108		
Progressive Conservative hold		Swing		+14.30
Source(s) Source: "Report of the Chief Electoral Officer, ... general enumeration and ... general election ... Legislative Assembly". Legislative Assembly of Alberta.

1993 Alberta general election
Party	Candidate	Votes	%	±%
Progressive Conservative	Jonathan Niles Havelock	9,328	62.38	+9.46
Liberal	Bill Walker	4,963	33.19	-1.55
New Democratic	Jason Ness	526	3.52	-8.82
Natural Law	Ken Nielsen	136	0.91	–
Total		14,953	99.77	–
Rejected, spoiled and declined		35	0.23	+0.03
Turnout		14,988	62.60	+12.55
Eligible voters		23,941		
Progressive Conservative hold		Swing		+5.50
Source(s) Source: "June 15 1993 (AB)". Canadian Elections Database.

=== Elections in the 1980s ===
1989 Alberta general election
Party	Candidate	Votes	%	±%
Progressive Conservative	Jim Dinning	7,412	52.92%	-8.59%
Liberal	Robert J. (Bob) Crump	4,865	34.74%	9.68%
New Democratic	Gordon M. Christie	1,728	12.34%	1.62%
Total		14,005	–	–
Rejected, spoiled and declined		29	–	–
Eligible electors / turnout		28,037	50.06%	5.44%
Progressive Conservative hold		Swing		-9.13%
Source(s) Source: "Calgary-Shaw Official Results 1989 Alberta general election". Alberta Heritage Community Foundation.

1986 Alberta general election
Party	Candidate	Votes	%	±%
Progressive Conservative	Jim Dinning	6,694	61.51%	–
Liberal	Brendan Dunphy	2,727	25.06%	–
New Democratic	Len Curle	1,166	10.71%	–
Representative	Byron L. Chenger	295	2.71%	–
Total		10,882	–	–
Rejected, spoiled and declined		23	–	–
Eligible electors / turnout		24,442	44.62%	–
Progressive Conservative pickup new district.				
Source(s) Source: "Calgary-Shaw Official Results 1986 Alberta general election". Alberta Heritage Community Foundation.

== Senate nominee election results ==
=== 2004 ===
2004 Senate nominee election results: Calgary-Shaw				Turnout 39.74%	
Affiliation	Candidate	Votes	% votes	% ballots	Rank
Progressive Conservative	Bert Brown	5,115	17.89%	56.33%	1
Progressive Conservative	Betty Unger	4,132	14.45%	45.50%	2
Progressive Conservative	Jim Silye	4,098	14.33%	45.13%	5
Progressive Conservative	Cliff Breitkreuz	3,293	11.52%	36.26%	3
Progressive Conservative	David Usherwood	3,015	10.54%	33.20%	6
Independent	Link Byfield	2,282	7.98%	25.13%	4
Alberta Alliance	Vance Gough	1,839	6.43%	20.25%	8
Alberta Alliance	Michael Roth	1,686	5.90%	18.57%	7
Alberta Alliance	Gary Horan	1,590	5.56%	17.51%	10
Independent	Tom Sindlinger	1,545	5.40%	17.01%	9
Total votes		28,595	100%		
Total ballots		9,081	3.15 votes per ballot		
Rejected, spoiled and declined		1,519			

Voters had the option of selecting four candidates on the ballot.

== Nomination contests ==
UCP Calgary-Shaw nomination contest: June 24, 2026

Candidate
Candidate	Votes	%
Mike Derry	286	56.4
Dan McLean	221	43.6
Total	507	100.0
Eligible voters/Voter turnout	949	53.4

== Student vote results ==
Participating schools
Bishop OByrne High School
Centennial High School

On November 19, 2004, a student vote was conducted at participating Alberta schools to parallel the 2004 Alberta general election results. The vote was designed to educate students and simulate the electoral process for persons who had not yet reached the legal majority. The vote was conducted in 80 of the 83 provincial electoral districts with students voting for actual election candidates. Schools with a large student body that reside in another electoral district had the option to vote for candidates outside of the electoral district than where they were physically located.

2004 Alberta student vote results
Affiliation	Candidate	Votes	%
Progressive Conservative	Cindy Ady	44	52.38%
Green	Rick Papineau	16	19.05%
Liberal	John Roggeveen	10	11.91%
NDP	Jarrett Young	9	10.71%
Alberta Alliance	Barry Chase	4	4.76%
Separation	Daniel Doherty	1	1.19%
Total		84	100%
Rejected, spoiled and declined		2	

=== 2012 ===
2012 Alberta student vote results
Affiliation	Candidate	Votes	%
Progressive Conservative	Farouk Adatia		%
Wildrose	Jeff Wilson		
Liberal			%
Alberta Party	Brandon Beasley		
NDP	Ashley Fairall		%
Total			100%

== See also ==
- List of Alberta provincial electoral districts
- Canadian provincial electoral districts
