= 2026 Calgary-Shaw provincial by-election =

2026 provincial by-election in Alberta, Canada

- September 14, 2026

Riding of Calgary-Shaw
	First party	Second party	Third party
	NDP	UCP	Tory
Candidate	Kyle Campbell	Mike Derry	Kyle Joseph
Party	New Democratic	United Conservative	Progressive Tory
Last election	42.71%	56.34%	Did not contest
Popular vote	7,461	6,879	978
Percentage	46.63%	42.99%	6.11%
Swing	▲3.91	▼13.35	N/A
MLA before election
Rebecca Schulz
United Conservative
Elected MLA
Kyle Campbell
New Democratic

A by-election to the Legislative Assembly of Alberta was held on September 14, 2026 in Calgary-Shaw following the resignation of Rebecca Schulz. The election was won by the NDP's Kyle Campbell, gaining the seat from the governing UCP, marking its first ever by-election loss in party history. It is also the first time since 1966 that the Alberta NDP has gained a seat in a by-election.

== Background ==
On May 15, 2026, Rebecca Schulz resigned from her seat in the Legislative Assembly of Alberta. A writ of election was issued on August 17 to hold the election on September 14, 2026.

== Candidates ==
=== United Conservative ===
The United Conservative Party nominated entrepreneur and human resources consultant Mike Derry on June 24, 2026. He defeated Calgary Ward 13 councillor Dan McLean, who represents Communities First at the municipal level.

UCP Calgary-Shaw nomination contest: June 24, 2026

Candidate
Candidate	Votes	%
Mike Derry	286	56.4
Dan McLean	221	43.6
Total	507	100.0
Eligible voters/Voter turnout	949	53.4

=== New Democratic ===
The Alberta New Democratic Party nominated financial sector worker Kyle Campbell on June 26, 2026.

=== Progressive Tory ===
The Progressive Tory Party of Alberta, formerly known as the Alberta Party, nominated social studies teacher Kyle Joseph in August 2026. He will be the first candidate to represent the new party name on a ballot.

=== Liberal ===
The Alberta Liberal Party nominated its party leader, John Roggeveen, as its candidate on August 6, 2026.

=== Other candidates ===
Rolly Ashdown will be running as an independent candidate. He resides in Langdon, and served as a councillor for Rocky View County from 2010 to 2017. He is also the former United Conservative Party constituency association president for Chestermere-Strathmore.

Green Party of Alberta leader James Anderson opted not to run in the byelection, instead committing to running in Fort Saskatchewan-Vegreville in the next provincial election.

== Results ==
Alberta provincial by-election, September 14, 2026: Calgary-Shaw Resignation of Rebecca Schulz
** Preliminary results — Not yet official **
Party	Candidate	Votes	%	±%
New Democratic	Kyle Campbell	7,461	46.63	+3.91
United Conservative	Mike Derry	6,879	42.99	-13.35
Progressive Tory	Kyle Joseph	978	6.11	—
Liberal	John Roggeveen	602	3.76	—
Independent	Rolly Ashdown	82	0.51	—
Total valid votes		16,002		
Total rejected ballots				
Turnout				
Eligible voters				
New Democratic gain from United Conservative		Swing		+8.63

=== Results by poll ===
Poll	Location	Neighbourhood	Ashdown	Campbell	Derry	Joseph	Roggeveen	Vote Total
1	Samuel W. Shaw School	Shawnessy	0	55	54	3	8	120
2	Samuel W. Shaw School	Shawnessy	1	64	77	3	2	147
3	Samuel W. Shaw School	Shawnessy	0	89	104	8	6	207
4	Janet Johnstone School	Shawnessy	0	53	57	8	4	122
5	Janet Johnstone School	Shawnessy	4	35	39	9	5	92
6	Janet Johnstone School	Shawnessy	0	31	40	7	9	87
7	Janet Johnstone School	Shawnessy	1	90	81	7	7	186
8	Janet Johnstone School	Shawnessy	0	52	65	9	8	134
9	Samuel W. Shaw School	Shawnessy	1	76	75	7	10	169
10	Samuel W. Shaw School	Shawnessy	1	61	74	8	8	152
11	Father Doucet School	Somerset	1	78	53	4	7	143
12	Father Doucet School	Somerset	1	66	81	1	3	152
13	Father Doucet School	Somerset	3	36	38	4	2	83
14	Father Doucet School	Somerset	0	35	13	0	4	52
15	Father Doucet School	Somerset	2	45	33	1	1	82
16	Father Doucet School	Somerset	1	48	54	14	5	122
17	Father Doucet School	Somerset	0	78	64	12	5	159
18	Somerset School	Somerset	0	93	94	22	3	212
19	Father Doucet School	Somerset	0	30	25	3	2	60
20	Somerset School	Belmont	0	55	37	1	7	100
21	Somerset School	Silverado	0	57	61	2	10	130
22	Somerset School	Silverado	0	54	52	4	2	112
23	Somerset School	Silverado	2	44	79	7	5	137
24	Somerset School	Silverado	0	38	57	7	4	106
25	Somerset School	Silverado	1	34	34	2	2	73
26	Holy Child School	Silverado	0	67	45	6	2	120
27	Holy Child School	Silverado	0	67	45	6	2	120
28	Holy Child School	Silverado	1	44	41	4	3	93
29	Holy Child School	Yorkville	2	78	112	10	15	217
30	Holy Child School	Belmont	0	85	98	12	8	203
31	Holy Child School	Pine Creek	0	40	58	8	1	107
32	Holy Child School	Pine Creek	2	60	64	4	5	135
33	Chaparral School	Chaparral	2	62	87	19	4	174
34	Chaparral School	Chaparral	2	80	73	19	6	180
35	St. Sebastian School	Chaparral	3	77	84	17	6	187
36	St. Sebastian School	Chaparral	0	31	55	10	5	101
37	St. Sebastian School	Chaparral	1	34	27	7	3	72
38	St. Sebastian School	Chaparral	2	44	56	13	4	119
39	St. Sebastian School	Chaparral	2	95	122	26	6	251
40	Chaparral School	Chaparral	0	63	79	15	4	161
41	Chaparral School	Chaparral	0	74	118	17	7	216
42	Chaparral School	Chaparral	0	72	78	16	6	172
43	Chaparral School	Chaparral	1	43	72	13	2	131
44	St. Sebastian School	Chaparral	2	57	125	25	9	218
45	St. Sebastian School	Chaparral	0	41	61	10	6	118
46	Ron Southern School	Wolf Willow	0	47	42	8	4	101
47	Ron Southern School	Wolf Willow	0	12	17	2	2	33
48	Ron Southern School	Wolf Willow	0	17	29	0	2	48
49	Ron Southern School	Walden	2	46	59	10	0	117
50	Ron Southern School	Walden	1	26	20	3	4	54
51	Ron Southern School	Walden	0	45	35	3	4	87
52	St. Sebastian School	Walden	0	43	55	3	8	109
53	Ron Southern School	Walden	2	34	26	8	5	75
54	St. Sebastian School	Legacy	2	39	29	5	1	76
55	Ron Southern School	Walden	2	38	31	5	4	80
56	Ron Southern School	Wolf Willow	0	1	4	0	0	5
57	Ron Southern School	Walden	0	33	42	5	9	89
58	St. Sebastian School	Walden	0	52	57	5	1	115
59	St. Sebastian School	Walden	0	64	43	6	7	120
60	St. Sebastian School	Legacy	0	36	29	5	3	73
61	Living Spirit School	Legacy	1	40	38	3	0	82
62	Living Spirit School	Legacy	0	31	31	7	2	71
63	Living Spirit School	Legacy	0	62	58	4	4	128
64	Living Spirit School	Legacy	0	62	97	6	1	166
65	Living Spirit School	Legacy	0	77	85	5	1	168
66	Living Spirit School	Legacy	0	60	55	1	10	126
67	Living Spirit School	Legacy	0	54	63	8	9	134
68	Living Spirit School	Legacy	0	80	128	9	4	221
Advance	Sundance	–	26	3,560	2,705	416	244	6,951
Mobile	Agecare Walden Heights/Silvera For Seniors - Shawnessy/Silverado Creek Seniors Center	–	5	18	39	14	24	100
Special Ballot			1	279	111	31	18	440

== Previous results ==
2023 Alberta general election: Calgary-Shaw
Party	Candidate	Votes	%	±%
United Conservative	Rebecca Schulz	13,970	56.34	-8.98
New Democratic	David Cloutier	10,591	42.71	+17.09
Solidarity Movement	Pietro Cervo	236	0.95	–
Total		24,797	98.86	–
Rejected, declined and spoiled		287	1.14	+0.30
Turnout		25,084	63.56	-4.83
Eligible voters		39,464		
United Conservative hold		Swing		-13.03
Source(s) Source: Elections Alberta
