= John Roggeveen =

Canadian politician and lawyer

Leader of the Alberta Liberal Party
- Incumbent
- Assumed office March 6, 2021
- Preceded by: David Khan

Personal details
- Party: Alberta Liberal Party (provincial)
- Education: University of Alberta

John Roggeveen is a Canadian politician and lawyer serving as leader of the Alberta Liberals since March 6, 2021 on an interim basis and since December 8, 2022 permanently. The Calgary-based lawyer was raised in Edmonton. He graduated from the University of Alberta and is married with three adult daughters.

In December 2025, Roggeveen announced that he would be resigning as party leader "effective on the date a new leader is either elected or appointed."

== Election results ==
2004 Alberta general election: Calgary-Shaw
Party	Candidate	Votes	%	±%
Progressive Conservative	Cindy Ady	6,735	63.44	-17.28
Liberal	John Roggeveen	2,410	22.70	+8.41
Alberta Alliance	Barry Chase	620	5.84	–
Green	Rick Papineau	381	3.59	–
New Democratic	Jarrett Young	300	2.83	-0.07
Separation	Daniel W. Doherty	170	1.60	+0.72
Total		10,616	99.22	–
Rejected, spoiled and declined		83	0.78	+0.56
Turnout		10,699	40.51	-10.56
Eligible voters		26,408		
Progressive Conservative hold		Swing		-12.84
Source(s) Source: "2004 Provincial General Election Report" (PDF). Elections Alberta.

2008 Alberta general election: Calgary-Shaw
Party	Candidate	Votes	%	±%
Progressive Conservative	Cindy Ady	7,010	58.12%	-5.32%
Liberal	John Roggeveen	2,958	24.53%	1.82%
Wildrose	Richard P. Dur	1,268	10.51%	–
Green	Jennifer Saunders	491	4.07%	0.48%
New Democratic	Jenn Carlson	334	2.77%	-0.06%
Total		12,061	–	–
Rejected, spoiled and declined		40	29	3
Eligible electors / Turnout		30,409	39.80%	-0.46%
Progressive Conservative hold		Swing		-3.57%
Source(s) Source: "22 - Calgary-Shaw, 2008 Alberta general election". officialresults.elections.ab.ca. Elections Alberta.

2012 Alberta general election: Calgary-Shaw
Party	Candidate	Votes	%	±%
Wildrose	Jeff Wilson	7,365	45.21%	34.70%
Progressive Conservative	Farouk Adatia	6,864	42.13%	-15.99%
Liberal	John Roggeveen	1,126	6.91%	-17.61%
New Democratic	Ashley Fairall	599	3.68%	0.91%
Alberta Party	Brandon Beasley	337	2.07%	–
Total		16,291	–	–
Rejected, spoiled and declined		104	43	13
Eligible electors / turnout		30,185	54.36%	14.55%
Wildrose gain from Progressive Conservative		Swing		-15.26%
Source(s) Source: "24 - Calgary-Shaw, 2012 Alberta general election". officialresults.elections.ab.ca. Elections Alberta.

2015 Alberta general election: Calgary-Elbow
Party	Candidate	Votes	%	±%
Alberta Party	Greg Clark	8,707	42.20%	15.32%
Progressive Conservative	Gordon Edwin Dirks	6,254	30.31%	-2.91%
New Democratic	Catherine Welburn	3,256	15.78%	12.06%
Wildrose	Megan Brown	1,786	8.66%	-15.50%
Liberal	John Roggeveen	565	2.74%	-9.28%
Social Credit	Larry R. Heather	67	0.32%	–
Total		20,635	–	–
Rejected, spoiled and declined		43	43	15
Eligible electors / turnout		34,681	59.67%	22.51%
Alberta Party gain from Progressive Conservative		Swing		-8.81%
Source(s) Source: "09 - Calgary-Elbow, 2015 Alberta general election". officialresults.elections.ab.ca. Elections Alberta. Chief Electoral Officer (2016). 2015 General Election. A Report of the Chief Electoral Officer (PDF) (Report). Edmonton, Alta.: Elections Alberta. pp. 121–124.

2019 Alberta general election: Calgary-Fish Creek
Party	Candidate	Votes	%	±%	Expenditures
United Conservative	Richard Gotfried	15,975	61.52	-1.64	$64,738
New Democratic	Rebecca Bounsall	7,476	28.79	-1.85	$46,721
Alberta Party	Robert Tremblay	1,699	6.54	+2.16	$1,077
Liberal	John Roggeveen	359	1.38	+0.11	$500
Green	Taylor Stasila	231	0.89	–	$500
Alberta Independence	Tomas Manasek	226	0.87	–	$937
Total		25,966	99.58	–	
Rejected, spoiled and declined		109	0.42		
Turnout		26,075	72.11		
Eligible voters		36,158			
United Conservative notional hold		Swing		+0.11	
Source(s) Source: Elections Alberta Note: Expenses is the sum of "Election Expenses", "Other Expenses" and "Transfers Issued". The Elections Act limits "Election Expenses" to $50,000.

2023 Alberta general election: Calgary-Lougheed
Party	Candidate	Votes	%	±%
United Conservative	Eric Bouchard	9,690	56.45	-9.25
New Democratic	Venkat Ravulaparthi	6,924	40.33	+15.86
Liberal	John Roggeveen	369	2.15	+0.91
Solidarity Movement	Nathaniel Pawlowski	184	1.07	–
Total		17,167	99.18	–
Rejected and declined		142	0.82	
Turnout		17,309	60.06	
Eligible voters		28,818		
United Conservative hold		Swing		-12.55
Source(s) Source: Elections Alberta

Alberta provincial by-election, September 14, 2026: Calgary-Shaw Resignation of Rebecca Schulz
** Preliminary results — Not yet official **
Party	Candidate	Votes	%	±%
New Democratic	Kyle Campbell	7,461	46.63	+3.91
United Conservative	Mike Derry	6,879	42.99	-13.35
Progressive Tory	Kyle Joseph	978	6.11	—
Liberal	John Roggeveen	602	3.76	—
Independent	Rolly Ashdown	82	0.51	—
Total valid votes		16,002		
Total rejected ballots				
Turnout				
Eligible voters				
New Democratic gain from United Conservative		Swing		+8.63
