= Margaret Southern =

Canadian businesswoman

- Born: Margaret Visser; 26 February 1931 (age 95); High River, Alberta, Canada
- Other names: Marg
- Known for: Spruce Meadows
- Spouse: Ron Southern
- Children: Nancy Southern; Linda Southern-Heathcott

Margaret Elizabeth Southern, CC LVO AOE (born Margaret Visser on 26 February 1931) is a Canadian businesswoman, noted as a co-founder of the Spruce Meadows equestrian park near Calgary.

Born in High River, Alberta, she graduated from the University of Alberta with a Bachelor of Physical Education degree in 1953. She joined the University of Calgary in her early career, becoming the first female physical education instructor on that campus. She served as Elizabeth II's Canadian Lady-in-Waiting during the Queen's 1990 royal tour of Canada. She was made a lieutenant of the Royal Victorian Order for her service to the Canadian sovereign.

She was married to ATCO chair Ron Southern until his death in 2016. The Southerns opened Spruce Meadows in 1975, a facility that remains an international-grade equestrian sports facility today. Southern has also participated on various business, community and non-profit boards during her career.

In 1988, she was honoured with her home province's highest civilian award, the Alberta Order of Excellence, after becoming a member of the Order of Canada the previous year. Within the Order of Canada she was promoted to highest chief Officer level in October 1993 and Companion in December 2007 for having "demonstrated passionate leadership and commitment to sport as a professional and volunteer".
