= Bridlewood =

Bridlewood can refer to:

== Places ==
- Bridlewood, Ottawa, a neighbourhood in Ottawa, Ontario, Canada
- Bridlewood, Calgary, a neighbourhood in Calgary, Alberta, Canada
- Bridlewood, a neighbourhood in the Tam O'Shanter-Sullivan and L'Amoreaux neighbourhoods in Toronto(Scarborough), Canada
- Bridlewood, a neighborhood in Bristow, Virginia (Prince William County), United States
- Bridlewood, Nebraska, a neighborhood in Omaha, Nebraska, United States

== Other ==
- Bridlewood Community Elementary School, an elementary and middle school in Ottawa, Ontario, Canada
- Somerset-Bridlewood (C-Train), a C-Train station in Calgary, Alberta, Canada
- Bridlewood Mall, a shopping center in Toronto, Ontario, Canada
- Bridlewood, a forest village which serves as the home to the unicorn tribe, featured in My Little Pony: A New Generation, "My Little Pony: Tell Your Tale, and My Little Pony: Make Your Mark.
