= Somerset–Bridlewood station =

Light rail station in Calgary, Alberta, Canada

Somerset – Bridlewood
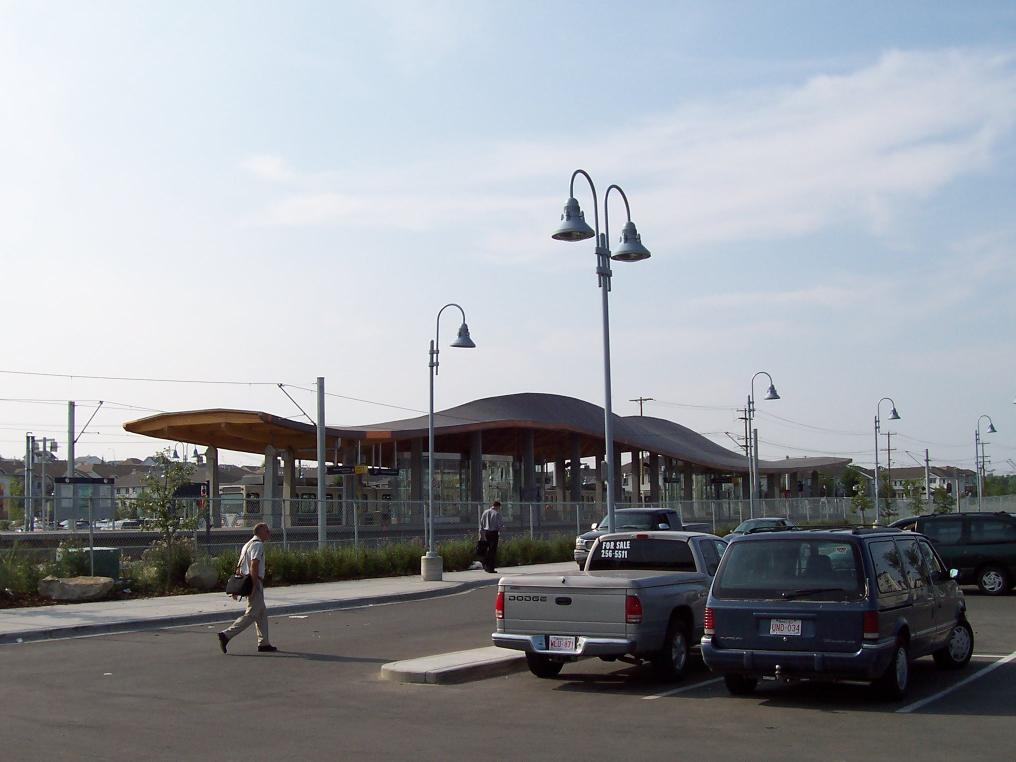

General information
- Location: 17100 - 6 Street SW
- Coordinates: 50°53′57″N 114°04′09″W
- Owner: Calgary Transit
- Platforms: Centre-loading platform
- Connections: 11 Southwest Loop; 12 Southwest Loop; 14 Bridlewood/Cranston; 52 Evergreen/Somerset; 75 Mahogany/Somerset; 78 Sundance/Chaparral; 102 Millrise/Sliverado; 153 Copperfield; 167 Walden/Legacy; 194 Chaparral Valley/Wolf Willow; Okotoks On-It Regional Transit

Construction
- Structure type: At-grade
- Parking: 913 spaces
- Accessible: yes

History
- Opened: 2004; 22 years ago

Services
Preceding station	Calgary Transit	Following station
Shawnessy toward Tuscany	Red Line	Terminus
Location

Somerset–Bridlewood Station is a CTrain light rail station in the Calgary, Alberta community of Shawnessy. It is the current southern terminus of the Red Line. The station is one of two that opened on June 28, 2004 as part of the second phase of the South LRT Extension. The station is located on the exclusive LRT right of way (adjacent to CPR ROW), 16.9 km (10.5 mi) south of the City Hall interlocking along Shawville Gate. 913 parking spaces are included in the park-and-ride facility at the station. The station consists of a center-loading platform with at-grade crossings at both ends of the platform. Unlike a majority of CTrain stations, the platform was initially constructed to accommodate a four-car-length train.

In 2007, the station registered an average of 13,000 boardings per weekday. This is up from a ridership of 10,100 from 2005.

== History ==
=== Commuter Rail Pilot ===
Somerset-Bridlewood Station was originally opened as 162nd Avenue Station in Spring 1996 as a temporary platform on the CP-Rail line as part of a pilot program to provide rail service to South Calgary. This commuter rail service operated a single Siemens RegioSprinter DMU during peak rush hour periods only, to and from a temporary platform at Anderson Station. The service only lasted five months, however, ridership proved popular and led to the priority decision to official extend the Red Line. The current station was constructed just south of the temporary platform and re-opened as Somerset-Bridlewood on June 28, 2004.

== Station Upgrades ==
A dedicated bus loop opened on June 27th, 2016, with bus stops and services being transferred from the original bus stops located on Shawville Gate.

== Transit Connections ==
Bus connections to Somerset–Bridlewood station as of 31 August, 2026:

- 11 - Southwest Loop (Clockwise)
- 12 - Southwest Loop (Counterclockwise)
- 14 - Bridlewood (West) / 14 - Cranston (East)
- 52 - Evergreen/Fish Creek-Lacombe (North)
- 75 - Mahogany (East)
- 78 - Chaparral (South) / 78 - Sundance (North)
- 102 - Millrise (North) / 102 - Silverado (South)
- 153 - Copperfield (East)
- 167 - Walden/Legacy (Counterclockwise)
- 194 - Chaparral Valley/Wolf Willow (Clockwise)
- On-It Regional Transit - Okotoks Commuter / Somerset-Bridlewood LRT Station

== Around the Station ==
=== Major Destinations ===
- Shawnessy Towne Centre (shopping plaza)
- Sundance South Health Centre
- Sunpark Plaza
- YMCA Shawnessy

=== Communities ===
Residential

- Bridlewood, Calgary
- Shawnessy, Calgary
- Somerset, Calgary
- Sundance, Calgary

=== Educational Institutions ===
Secondary Schools

- Bishop O'Byrne High
- Centennial High

Primary Schools

- Father James Whelihan
- Somerset Elementary

=== Major Streets ===
- 162 Avenue SW / Sun Valley Boulevard
- Macleod Trail
- Shawville Boulevard
- Stoney Trail

== See also ==
- CTrain
- Red Line (Calgary)
- Fish Creek–Lacombe station
- McKnight–Westwinds station
- Shawnessy station
- Bridlewood, Calgary
- Shawnessy, Calgary
- Somerset, Calgary
