= MidSun Junior High School =

Location
- 660 Sunmills Drive S.E. Calgary, Alberta, T2X 3R5; Canada; 50.90184°N 114.03095°W

Information
- School type: Middle School/Junior High School
- Founded: 1998
- School board: Calgary Board of Education
- Area trustee: Mike Bradshaw
- Principal: Charlene Kuchniruk
- Grades: 7-9
- Enrollment: 679 (September 2020)
- Language: English
- Colours: Blue and Gold
- Team name: Lakers
- Feeder schools: Fish Creek Elementary; Sundance Elementary; Midnapore Elementary
- Feeds: Centennial High School

MidSun Junior High School is a Canadian middle school teaching grades seven through nine for the communities of Midnapore, Chaparral and Sundance, in Calgary, Alberta. It is part of the public Calgary Board of Education. When opened in 1998 it was designed with a capacity of 750 students, and quickly gained enrollment of slightly less, or slightly more, than that figure.

The need for a new junior high school (middle school) to alleviate busing concerns arose in 1996. The efforts of the community were met with success, and the school was opened for the fall of 1998. In 2006, students started coming from the community of Lake Chaparral. Currently, students graduating from MidSun Junior High attend Centennial High School.

The school has a Learning Resource Center (LRC), designed for special needs students. It also has a French as a Second Language program.

MidSun's network integrates Windows networking throughout the entire building. There are approximately 80 computers available for student use in the building. The school is divided into four distinct pods (Blue, Gold, Red, Green), each housing a different age group. These have been described as 'schools within a school'.
