= Jeff Wilson (Canadian politician) =

Canadian politician

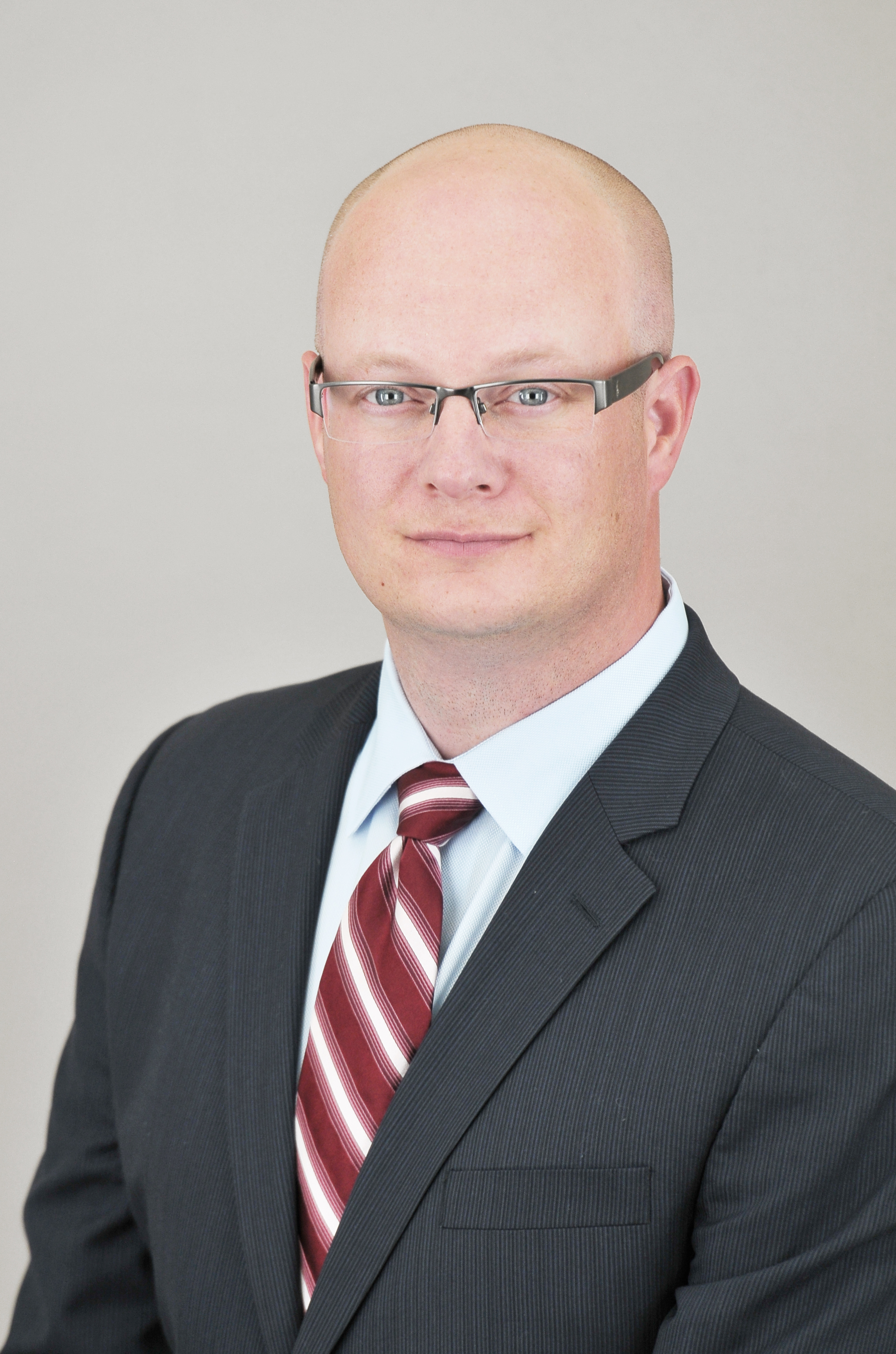

MLA for Calgary-Shaw
- In office 23 April 2012 – 5 May 2015
- Preceded by: Cindy Ady
- Succeeded by: Graham Sucha

Personal details
- Born: 1977 or 1978 (age 47–48)
- Party: Wildrose Party (2012-2014); Progressive Conservative (2014-present)
- Occupation: Communications

Jeff Wilson (born c. 1978) is a Canadian politician who was an elected member to the Legislative Assembly of Alberta formerly representing the electoral district of Calgary-Shaw. He was first elected in the 2012 provincial election as a member of the Wildrose Party, and currently remains a member of the Progressive Conservative Association of Alberta.

Wilson graduated from Harry Collinge high school in Hinton, Alberta. He completed a broadcasting diploma at Mount Royal College in Calgary in 2000. He worked in the communications field as an employee with AVW-TELAV, a North American audiovisual solutions company. Wilson served as president of the Broadcasting Society from 1999 to 2000 while attending Mount Royal college. An active member of his community, he has volunteered at Calgary's Ronald McDonald House and with the Calgary Women's Emergency Shelter. He is a member of the Standing Committee on Legislative Offices and the Standing Committee on Families and Communities. He also serves as a member of the Select Special Conflicts of Interest Act Review Committee.

As a politician, Wilson has been known for his good humour after asking two government ministers "Why are you so awesome?" and the deputy premier, "Why is your hair so awesome?" during Question Period on the last day of the 2012 fall session. In the 2013 spring sitting, Wilson furthered his reputation for good humour when he gained access to the government whip's notepad and sent notes to Progressive Conservative MLAs while in the Legislative Assembly, some of which advised MLAs to more enthusiastically applaud their government colleagues.

Wilson was an outspoken critic of changes to the funding model for persons with developmental disabilities in the 2013-2014 provincial budget, and called on the government to reduce administrative costs.

On 17 December 2014, he was one of nine Wildrose MLAs who crossed the floor to join the Progressive Conservative caucus but lost his reelection campaign in 2015 to the NDP's Graham Sucha.

== Electoral history ==
=== 2012 general election ===
2012 Alberta general election: Calgary-Shaw
Party	Candidate	Votes	%	±%
Wildrose	Jeff Wilson	7,365	45.21%	34.70%
Progressive Conservative	Farouk Adatia	6,864	42.13%	-15.99%
Liberal	John Roggeveen	1,126	6.91%	-17.61%
New Democratic	Ashley Fairall	599	3.68%	0.91%
Alberta Party	Brandon Beasley	337	2.07%	–
Total		16,291	–	–
Rejected, spoiled and declined		104	43	13
Eligible electors / turnout		30,185	54.36%	14.55%
Wildrose gain from Progressive Conservative		Swing		-15.26%
Source(s) Source: "24 - Calgary-Shaw, 2012 Alberta general election". officialresults.elections.ab.ca. Elections Alberta.

=== 2015 general election ===
2015 Alberta general election: Calgary-Shaw
Party	Candidate	Votes	%	±%
New Democratic	Graham Sucha	5,449	31.27%	27.59%
Progressive Conservative	Jeff Wilson	5,348	30.69%	-11.45%
Wildrose	Brad Leishman	5,301	30.42%	-14.79%
Liberal	Alexander Barrow	668	3.83%	-3.08%
Alberta Party	Evert Smith	661	3.79%	1.72%
Total		17,427	–	–
Rejected, spoiled and declined		64	22	11
Eligible electors / turnout		30,458	57.46%	3.10%
New Democratic gain from Wildrose		Swing		-1.25%
Source(s) Source: "24 - Calgary-Shaw, 2015 Alberta general election". officialresults.elections.ab.ca. Elections Alberta.
