= Centennial High School (Calgary) =

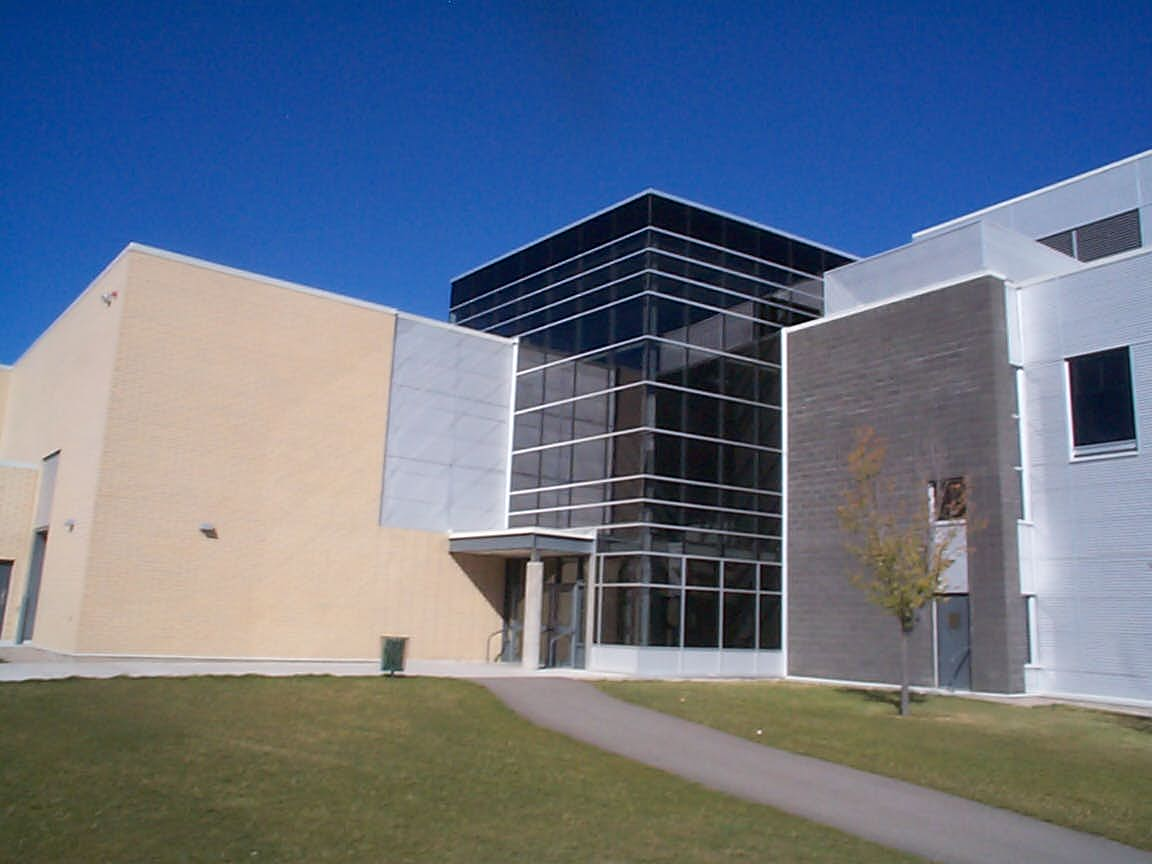
- The primary western entrance of the school.

Location
- 55 Sun Valley Boulevard S.E. Calgary, Alberta, T2X 3W7; Canada; 50.906°N 114.051°W

Information
- Motto: Latin: Condita orbis terrarum a melior locus (Making the world a better place)
- Founded: 2004
- School board: Calgary Board of Education
- Principal: Joe Sturgeon
- Grades: 10–12
- Enrollment: 1595 (2023)
  - Grade 10: 568
  - Grade 11: 540
  - Grade 12: 487
- Area: Area 5, Ward 14
- Colours: Green, silver, white, black
- Mascot: Coy the Coyote
- Team name: Coyotes
- Communities served: Alpine Park, Bridlewood, Chaparral, Midnapore, Millrise, Pine Creek, Shawnee Slopes, Shawnessy, Sundance, and Walden (as of September 2023); Dual Credit Program: Evergreen, Canyon Meadows, Parkland, Seton, and Deer Run
- Feeder schools: Midsun Junior High; Harold Panabaker; Robert Warren; Father James Whelihan; David Thompson; Samuel W. Shaw
- Website: https://centennial.cbe.ab.ca/

Centennial High School is a senior high school in Calgary, Alberta, teaching grades 10 through 12. The school's name was chosen as a reference to the 100th anniversary of the province of Alberta joining confederation in 2005, as the construction of the school was finished that year. The high school opened for students to attend in 2004, while the school was still undergoing construction. The school is part of the Calgary Board of Education's public school system, and is located in the neighbourhood of Sundance.

== Academics ==
Centennial High School teaches core courses such as English, Mathematics, Science, and Social studies as indicated by Alberta Education's Programs of Study mandated curriculum. Alongside this, alternative programs suited to specific students' needs are available, including Advanced Placement (AP), Commercial Foods and Cosmetology Apprenticeships, English Language Learner (ELL), Knowledge & Employability (K&E), and field trips.

Centennial also offers courses in several areas, including Career & Technology Studies (CTS), Fine & Performing Arts, Modern Language & Culture Studies, Physical Education & Wellness, and Academic related options. Several popular classes from each include Foods, Cosmetology, Robotics, Band, Drama, Spanish, Sports Performance, and Military studies, with there being plenty more.

== Notable alumni ==
- Alexa Gray (class of 2012), professional volleyball player
