= Kyle Campbell =

Canadian politician from Alberta

Kyle Campbell MLA

Member of the Legislative Assembly of Alberta for Calgary-Shaw
- Incumbent
- Assumed office September 14, 2026
- Preceded by: Rebecca Schulz

Personal details
- Born: Kyle Mark Campbell
- Party: New Democratic

Kyle Mark Campbell is a Canadian politician from the Alberta New Democratic Party (NDP) who was elected as a member of the Legislative Assembly of Alberta for Calgary-Shaw in the 2026 by-election, gaining the seat from the United Conservative Party (UCP).

Before politics, Campbell worked in the financial sector. He served as president of the Somerset Residents Association.

== Electoral record ==
Alberta provincial by-election, September 14, 2026: Calgary-Shaw Resignation of Rebecca Schulz
** Preliminary results — Not yet official **
| Party | Candidate | Votes | % | ±% |
|---|---|---|---|---|
| New Democratic | Kyle Campbell | 7,461 | 46.63 | +3.91 |
| United Conservative | Mike Derry | 6,879 | 42.99 | -13.35 |
| Progressive Tory | Kyle Joseph | 978 | 6.11 | — |
| Liberal | John Roggeveen | 602 | 3.76 | — |
| Independent | Rolly Ashdown | 82 | 0.51 | — |
| Total valid votes | | 16,002 | | |
| Total rejected ballots | | | | |
| Turnout | | | | |
| Eligible voters | | | | |
| New Democratic gain from United Conservative | | Swing | | +8.63 |
