= Graham Sucha =

Canadian politician

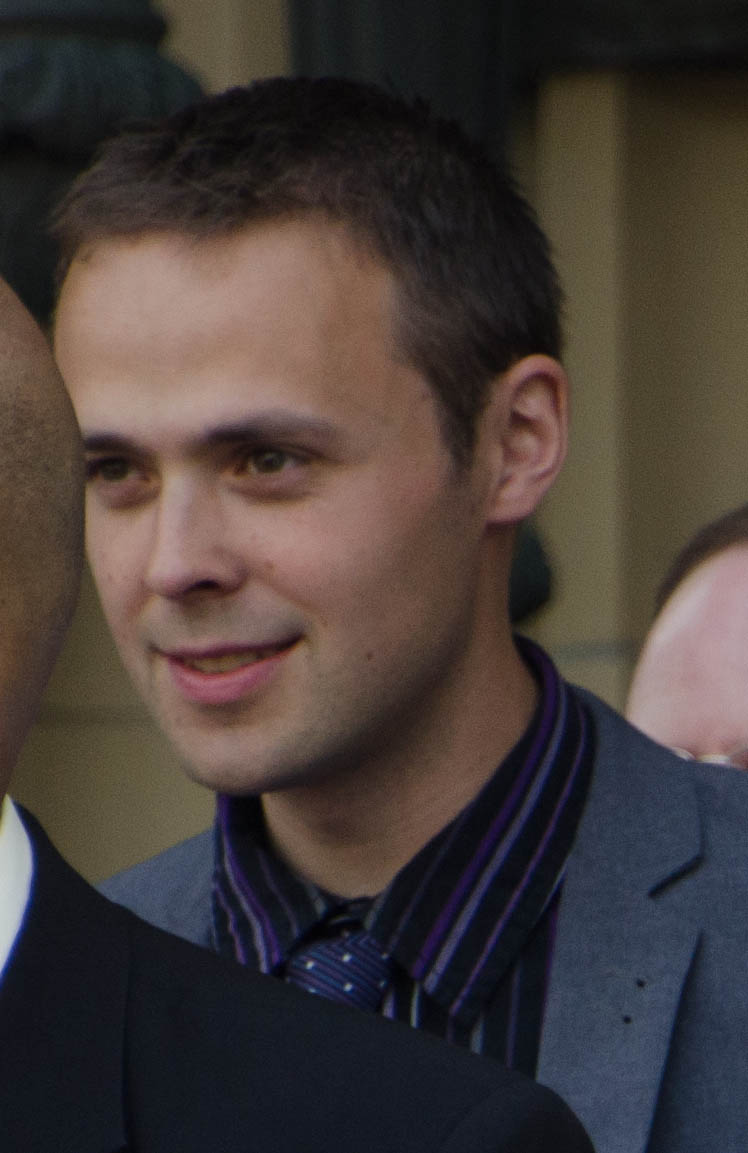
- Sucha in May 2015

Member of the Legislative Assembly of Alberta for Calgary-Shaw
- In office 5 May 2015 – 19 March 2019
- Preceded by: Jeff Wilson
- Succeeded by: Rebecca Schulz

Personal details
- Born: 1986 (age 39–40) Calgary, Alberta
- Party: Alberta New Democratic Party
- Education: Algonquin College Carleton University

Graham Dean Sucha (born 1986) is a Canadian politician who was elected in the 2015 Alberta general election to the Legislative Assembly of Alberta representing the electoral district of Calgary-Shaw.

== Background ==
Sucha was born in Calgary, Alberta in 1986 to parents who were both faculty members at the University of Calgary. In his early life he attended Crescent Heights High School where he was heavily involved in theatre. Sucha studied Television Broadcasting at Algonquin College and Political Science at Carleton University, both located in Ottawa.

In the late 2000s Sucha returned to Calgary to become a restaurant manager. He maintained that position until he was elected to the Legislative Assembly of Alberta for the constituency of Calgary Shaw in 2015. During that election campaign he was on parental leave caring for his daughter.

In 2016 Sucha was appointed to the Select Special Ethics and Accountability Committee. There he proposed spending limits for provincial candidates and parties for election campaigns. He suggested a limit of $40,000 for most constituencies and $50,000 for larger constituencies, as well as a limit of $1.6 million for political parties.

Sucha also served as chair of the Standing Committee on Alberta's Economic Future where he oversaw a thorough review of Bill 203, Alberta Standard Time Act. Bill 203, if passed, would have repeal the Daylight Saving Time Act and require the observance of "Alberta Standard Time". During this review over 13,000 individuals submitted feedback to the committee, with 75% of individuals wishing to abolish the practice of changing the clocks. Despite the high volume of individuals who wished to abolish the time change, the Standing Committee on Alberta's Economic Future recommended that Bill 203 not proceed, and it was voted down in the Legislative Assembly short after the report was released. Sucha as chair the committee also oversaw the review of Bill 201, Employment Standards (Firefighter Leave) Amendment Act, 2018, the review of the Personal Information Protection Act and the review on "Growing and Diversifying Alberta's Agrifood and Agribusiness Sectors".

Sucha was appointed Vice President of the Pacific Northwest Economic Region (PNWER) in 2017. While in that position Sucha worked to help negotiate mutual understanding on key issues between the Pacific Northwest States and Provinces during the NAFTA re-negotiations.

In Winter of 2017 Sucha was appointed to the Ministerial Panel on Child Intervention which was struck following the death of four year old Serenity. This panel met for over a year visiting five communities in three first nations communities over the span of 35 meetings. This ultimately led to changes in Alberta's child intervention process thru the passing of Bill 18.

Sucha was defeated in the April 2019 election losing to UCP candidate Rebecca Schulz. He currently serves as community outreach specialist for the tech not-for-profit Cybera.

== Electoral history ==
2019 Alberta general election: Calgary-Shaw
Party	Candidate	Votes	%	±%
United Conservative	Rebecca Schulz	14,261	65.32	+3.75
New Democratic	Graham Sucha	5,594	25.62	-5.95
Alberta Party	Bronson Ha	1,331	6.10	+4.72
Liberal	Vesna Samardzija	290	1.33	-3.30
Green	John Daly	212	0.97	+0.12
Alberta Independence	Jarek Bucholc	146	0.67	–
Total		21,834	99.16	–
Rejected, spoiled and declined		186	0.84	
Turnout		22,020	68.39	
Eligible voters		32,198		
United Conservative notional hold		Swing		+4.85
Source(s) Source: "2019 Provincial General Election Report" (PDF). Elections Alberta.

2015 Alberta general election: Calgary-Shaw
Party	Candidate	Votes	%	±%
New Democratic	Graham Sucha	5,449	31.27%	27.59%
Progressive Conservative	Jeff Wilson	5,348	30.69%	-11.45%
Wildrose	Brad Leishman	5,301	30.42%	-14.79%
Liberal	Alexander Barrow	668	3.83%	-3.08%
Alberta Party	Evert Smith	661	3.79%	1.72%
Total		17,427	–	–
Rejected, spoiled and declined		64	22	11
Eligible electors / turnout		30,458	57.46%	3.10%
New Democratic gain from Wildrose		Swing		-1.25%
Source(s) Source: "24 - Calgary-Shaw, 2015 Alberta general election". officialresults.elections.ab.ca. Elections Alberta.
