= Nancy Southern =

Canadian businesswoman

Nancy Southern AOE
- Born: Calgary, Alberta, Canada
- Education: University of Calgary (Economics)
- Occupation: CEO of ATCO
- Spouse: Jonathan Asselin
- Parent(s): Ron Southern, Margaret Southern

Nancy Southern AOE is a Canadian businesswoman and the CEO of ATCO, a publicly traded company based in Calgary, Alberta, Canada. Her father Ron Southern was the founder of ATCO and the Spruce Meadows equestrian centre.

== Early life and education ==
Southern was born and raised in Calgary, Alberta, and educated at the University of Calgary where she received a degree in economics.

== Career ==
Southern joined the ATCO Board of Directors in 1989 and named President & CEO of ATCO in 2003.

== Personal life ==
Southern is an accomplished equestrian show jumper and her family owns Spruce Meadows, an equestrian show jumping complex. She is married to Jonathan Asselin, an olympian that competed at the 2000 Summer Olympics.

Southern was made a member of the Alberta Order of Excellence in 2024.
