= Ron Southern =

Canadian businessman

- Born: Ronald Donald Southern; 25 July 1930; Calgary, Alberta, Canada
- Died: 21 January 2016 (aged 85); Calgary, Alberta, Canada
- Education: University of Alberta (BSc 1953)
- Spouse: Margaret Visser (m. 1954)
- Relatives: Nancy Southern

Ronald Donald Southern CC CBE AOE (25 July 1930 – 21 January 2016) was a Canadian businessman. He was the founder and chairman of Calgary-based ATCO Group, and the founder of the Spruce Meadows equestrian centre.

In 1947, Southern and his father each invested $2,000 in the original Alberta Trailer Hire Co., which later became ATCO. Southern received a Bachelor of Science degree from the University of Alberta in 1953 and began to work full-time for the company. He passed the title of chairman, president and chief executive officer to his daughter, Nancy Southern, in January 2000. As of 2024 the Southern family still control ATCO.

== Spruce Meadows ==
Southern and his wife Margaret Southern were the founders and co-chairs of Spruce Meadows. Opened in 1975, it was built for their daughters who had long been involved with competitive equestrian riding.

== Other affiliations ==
Southern was a director of several corporations, including Lafarge, Southam Inc., Chrysler Corporation of Canada, Imasco, Canadian Airlines, Fletcher Challenge, Royal & SunAlliance and Canadian Pacific. He was a director of Akita Drilling Ltd. and chairman of Sentgraf Enterprises Ltd. Southern was also a member of the Trilateral Commission. In September 2006, Ron Southern was appointed Officer of Orange Nassau by Her Majesty Queen Beatrix of The Netherlands.

== Honours and awards ==
Southern was invested as a Member of the Order of Canada in 1986 and a Member of the Order of the British Empire (MBE) in 1990, in recognition of his promotion of Anglo-Canadian relations in the fields of commerce, culture and sport. In 1992 he received the 125th Anniversary of the Confederation of Canada Medal. In 2002 he received the Canadian version of the Queen Elizabeth II Golden Jubilee Medal. In June 1995, he was elevated as a Commander of the Order of the British Empire (CBE). In August 2003, Southern was elevated as an Officer of the Order of Canada and promoted to Companion in 2006. In September 2006 he was invested as an Officer of the Order of Orange-Nassau by the Kingdom of the Netherlands. In 2012, he was appointed to the Alberta Order of Excellence. In 2012, Southern and wife Margaret were awarded the Canadian version of the Queen Elizabeth II Diamond Jubilee Medal by the Lieutenant Governor of Alberta, Donald Ethell.

He received honorary doctoral degrees from the University of Calgary in 1976 and the University of Alberta in 1991. In 1990, Southern received the International Distinguished Entrepreneur Award, presented by the University of Manitoba through the Faculty of Management. In 1995 he was inducted into the Canadian Business Hall of Fame. In 1996, he was named Financial Post CEO of the Year. He and his wife were inducted into Canada's Sports Hall of Fame in 2006.

Description	Notes
Order of Canada (CC)	Companion 5 October 2006; Officer 8 May 2003; Member 23 June 1986
Order of the British Empire (CBE)	Commander June 1995; Member 1990; Civil Division
Alberta Order of Excellence (AOE)	2012
125th Anniversary of the Confederation of Canada Medal	1992
Queen Elizabeth II Golden Jubilee Medal	2002; Canadian version of this medal
Queen Elizabeth II Diamond Jubilee Medal	2012; Canadian version of this medal
Order of Orange-Nassau	September 2006; Degree of Officer; Awarded by the Kingdom of the Netherlands
