= Somerset, Calgary =

Somerset
- Neighbourhood
- Location of Somerset in Calgary
- Coordinates: 50°53′52″N 114°04′52″W
- Country: Canada
- Province: Alberta
- City: Calgary
- Quadrant: SW
- Ward: 13
- Established: 1995

Government
  - Mayor: Jeromy Farkas
  - Administrative body: Calgary City Council
  - Councillor: Dan McLean (Communities First)

Area
  - Total: 3.4 km^{2} (1.3 sq mi)
- Elevation: 1,070 m (3,510 ft)

Population (2016)
  - Total: 8,596
  - Average Income: $88,150
- Website: Somerset Community Association

Somerset is a residential neighbourhood in the southwest quadrant of Calgary, Alberta, Canada. The community of Bridlewood lies directly to the west, meanwhile the community of Shawnessy lies both to the north and east of the community. Stoney Trail lies south of the community with the community of Silverado sitting south and the Spruce Meadows equestrian facility sitting southwest of Somerset.

Somerset is represented in the Calgary City Council by the Ward 13 councillor.

== Community boundaries ==
The community of Somerset is located in Calgary's southwest quadrant. The community is bounded by the CTrain train-track (LRT r.o.w.) to the east, James Mckevitt Road to the west, Stoney Trail to the south, and 162 Avenue SW to the north. Somerset–Bridlewood CTrain Station lies directly on the border of the communities of Somerset and Shawnessy and acts as a geographic landmark marking the border between the city's southeast and southwest quadrants.

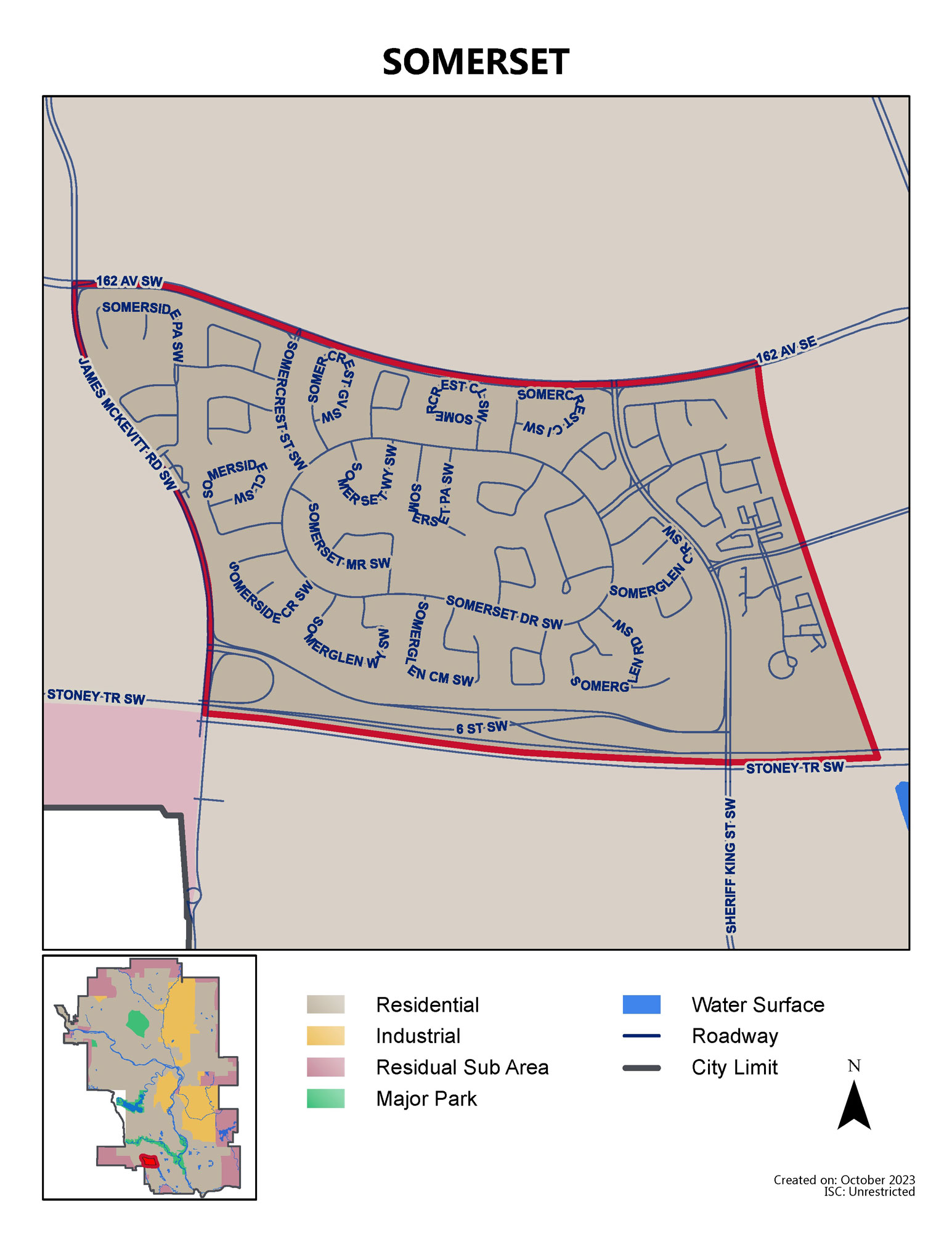
A map of the community boundaries of the Calgary community of Somerset

== Demographics ==
In the City of Calgary's 2016 municipal census, Somerset had a population of 8,596 living in 3,153 dwellings. With a land area of 2.3 km^{2} (0.89 sq mi), it had a population density of 3,710/km^{2} (9,620/sq mi) in 2012.

Residents in this community had a median household income of $88,150 in 2000, and there were 6.6% low income residents living in the neighbourhood. As of 2000, 23.1% of the residents were immigrants. A proportion of 10.8% of the buildings were condominiums or apartments, and 4.8% of the housing was used for renting.

== Education ==
The community is served by the Somerset School (K-4) public school, and Samuel W. Shaw School (5–9). Both of these schools are run by the Calgary Board of Education. Bishop O'Byrne High School, which is run by the Calgary Catholic School District, is also readily accessible to Somerset residents.

== Transit ==
Somerset–Bridlewood CTrain station services Somerset, situated at the community borders of Somerset and Shawnessy. Route 14, a major Calgary Transit bus route, travels through Somerset, destined for Bridlewood on its western leg and Seton on its eastern leg. Additionally, Route 52 also travels into Somerset, looping through Somerset on the circular Somerset Drive, after which it services Somerset–Bridlewood, Shawnessy and Fish Creek–Lacombe Stations. The Shawnessy CTrain is close in proximity to Somerset and can serve as a viable option for commuters originating their journeys in Somerset.

== See also ==
- List of neighbourhoods in Calgary
