= Rebecca Schulz =

Canadian politician

The Honourable Rebecca Schulz ECA MLA
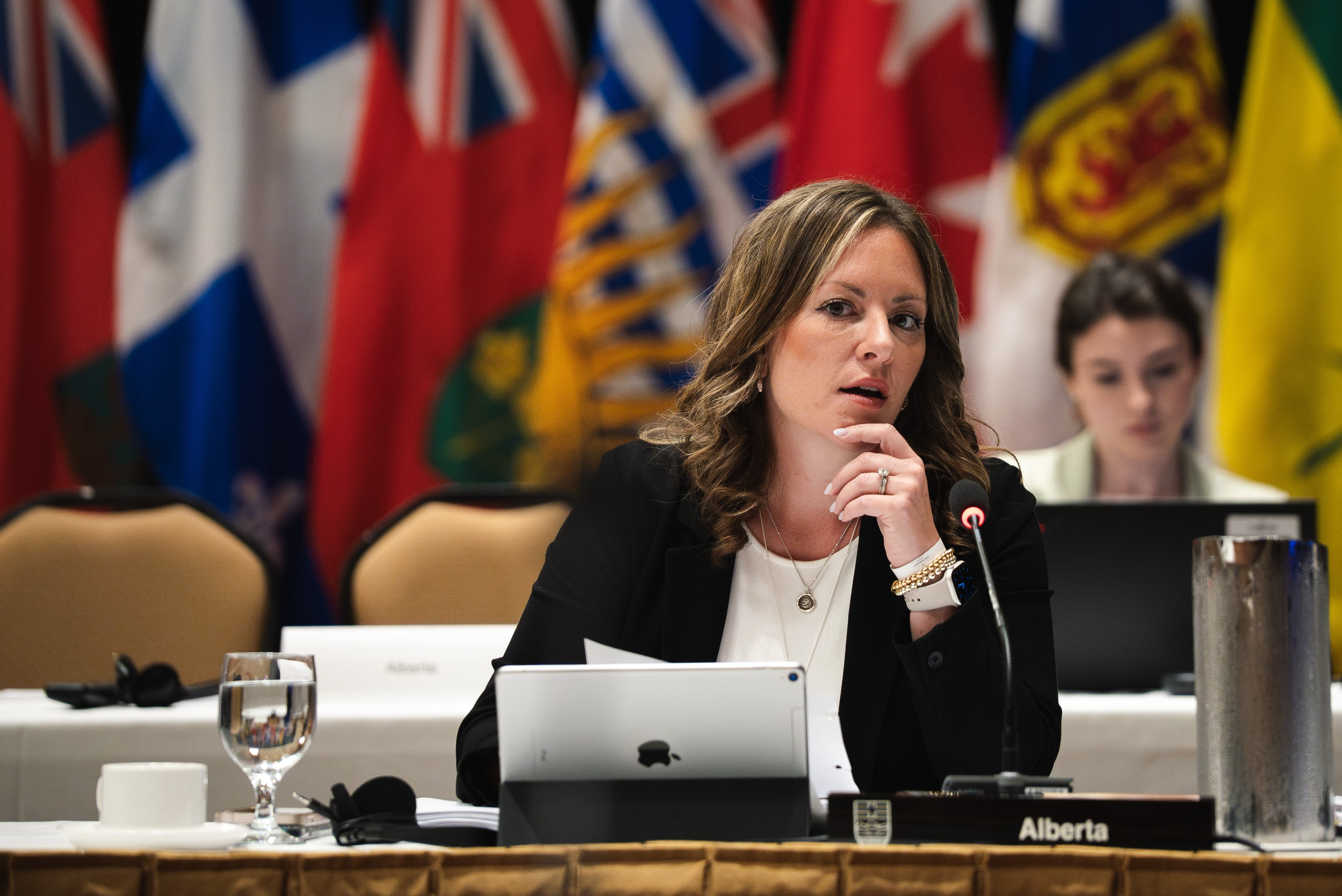
- Schulz in 2023

Minister of Environment and Protected Areas
- In office June 9, 2023 – January 2, 2026
- Premier: Danielle Smith
- Preceded by: Sonya Savage
- Succeeded by: Grant Hunter

Minister of Municipal Affairs
- In office October 24, 2022 – June 9, 2023
- Premier: Danielle Smith
- Preceded by: Ric McIver
- Succeeded by: Ric McIver

Minister of Children's Services
- In office April 30, 2019 – June 11, 2022
- Premier: Jason Kenney
- Preceded by: Danielle Larivee
- Succeeded by: Matt Jones

Member of the Legislative Assembly of Alberta for Calgary-Shaw
- In office April 16, 2019 – May 15, 2026
- Preceded by: Graham Sucha
- Succeeded by: Kyle Campbell

Personal details
- Born: July 30, 1984 (age 42)
- Party: United Conservative
- Spouse: Cole Schulz
- Children: 2
- Education: University of Saskatchewan; Johns Hopkins University
- Website: Government website; Campaign website

Rebecca Schulz ECA MLA (/ʃʊlts/ SHUULTS; born July 30, 1984) is a Canadian politician who was elected in the 2019 Alberta general election to represent the electoral district of Calgary-Shaw in the 30th Alberta Legislature.

She is a member of the United Conservative Party. She was appointed to the Executive Council of Alberta as the Minister of Children's Services on April 30, 2019, by Alberta Premier Jason Kenney. Schulz was a candidate for leader of the United Conservative Party in 2022 following the resignation of Premier Jason Kenney as leader. Schulz placed fourth. After the leadership election, Premier Danielle Smith appointed Schulz as the Minister of Municipal Affairs. She served as Alberta's Minister of Environment and Protected Areas from June 9, 2023, until her resignation on January 2, 2026.

== Background ==
Schulz holds a Master's degree in Communication from Johns Hopkins University and a Bachelor of Arts with Honours in English from the University of Saskatchewan.

Rebecca Schulz first got involved in politics in 2009 when she worked in the Office of the 14th Premier of Saskatchewan, Brad Wall. She also worked as an event coordinator at the University of Ottawa - L'Hereux Dubé Social Justice Fund for seven months, a senior communications officer at SaskEnergy, and a media relations officer at the Government of Saskatchewan. Then, Rebecca Schulz worked as a manager of media relations at Saskatchewan Government Insurance from 2012 to 2013, and as Director of Communications at the Ministry of Education in the Government of Saskatchewan. Just before becoming an MLA, she worked as Director of Alumni Marketing and Communications at the University of Calgary.

Rebecca Schulz was raised in a small town in Saskatchewan. She and her husband, Cole, moved to Alberta, and they have two young children.

== Political career ==
=== Minister of Children's Services (2019–2022) ===
Schulz was appointed to the Executive Council of Alberta as the Minister of Children's Services on April 30, 2019, by Alberta Premier Jason Kenney.

As the Minister of Children's Services, she sponsored Bill 39, the Child Care Licensing (Early Learning and Child Care) Amendment Act, 2020. The bill passed on December 1, 2020. This Act is to be interpreted and applied in a manner that supports and preserves the safety, security, well-being, and development of the child, in addition to providing flexible childcare choices and accessibility for families. Lastly, it seeks to engage parents, guardians, and community members in the provision of childcare to support the child's optimal development.

She was responsible for negotiating on behalf of Alberta the federal-provincial agreement on childcare.

=== 2022 leadership campaign ===
On June 14, 2022, Schulz resigned as the Minister of Children's Services and announced her candidacy in the 2022 United Conservative Party leadership election following the resignation of Premier Jason Kenney as leader. Her leadership campaign was supported by co-chairs Rona Ambrose, Calgary MP Stephanie Kusie, MLA Jeremy Nixon, MLA Ric McIver, and MLA Jason Copping. Schulz placed fourth in the leadership race and was eliminated with 8.4% of the vote in the fourth round.

=== Minister of Municipal Affairs (2022–2023) ===
After the leadership race election, Premier Danielle Smith appointed Rebecca Schulz as the Minister of Municipal Affairs. She was sworn in on October 24, 2022.

=== Minister of Environment and Protected Areas (2023–2026) ===
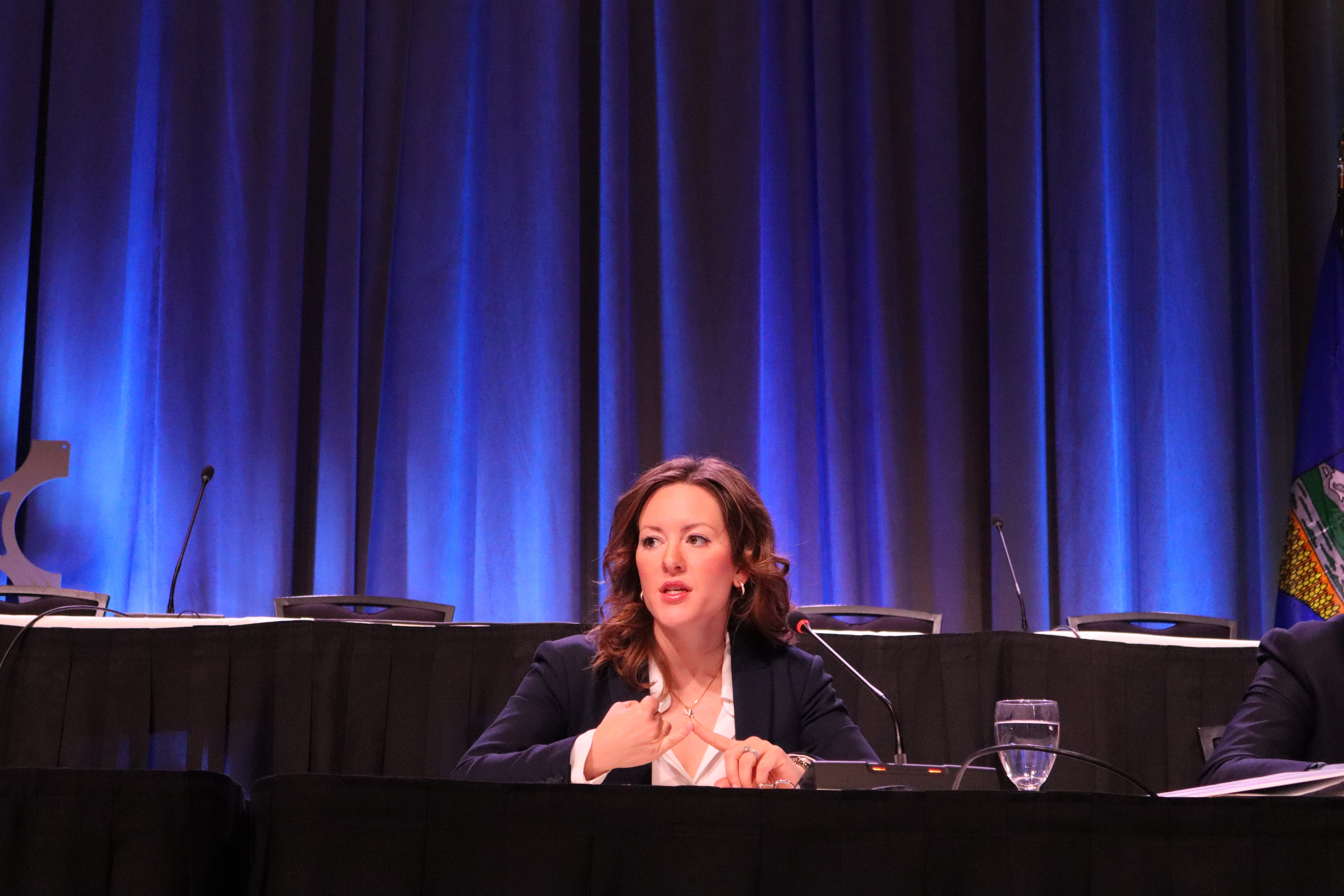
Minister speaking at a panel as Alberta's Minister of Environment and Protected Areas

Since June 9, 2023, Minister Schulz has served as the Minister of Environment and Protected Areas under Premier Danielle Smith's leadership.

Her mandate includes defending Alberta's energy sector, especially from federal overreach, working with the Minister of Energy and Minerals on provincial frameworks to develop the province's energy sector and reduce emissions, and reviewing Alberta's water management strategy, which would increase water availability and licenses, notably in municipalities.

A recall petition against Schulz was approved by Elections Alberta on December 2, 2025. Signature collection runs from December 11, 2025 to March 10, 2026, requiring 15,000 signatures. However, in December 2025, Schulz announced that she would resign as a Cabinet minister on January 2, 2026, and resign as an MLA in May 2026. Her seat was lost to the NDP in the 2026 Calgary-Shaw provincial by-election.

Cabinet post (1)
Predecessor	Office	Successor
Sonya Savage	Minister of Environment and Protected Areas; June 9, 2023 – January 2, 2026	Grant Hunter
Enter ministry number
Cabinet post (1)
Predecessor	Office	Successor
Ric McIver	Minister of Municipal Affairs; October 24, 2022 – June 9, 2023	Ric McIver

== Electoral record ==
2023 Alberta general election: Calgary-Shaw
Party	Candidate	Votes	%	±%
United Conservative	Rebecca Schulz	13,970	56.34	-8.98
New Democratic	David Cloutier	10,591	42.71	+17.09
Solidarity Movement	Pietro Cervo	236	0.95	–
Total		24,797	98.86	–
Rejected, declined and spoiled		287	1.14	+0.30
Turnout		25,084	63.56	-4.83
Eligible voters		39,464		
United Conservative hold		Swing		-13.03
Source(s) Source: Elections Alberta

2019 Alberta general election: Calgary-Shaw
Party	Candidate	Votes	%	±%
United Conservative	Rebecca Schulz	14,261	65.32	+3.75
New Democratic	Graham Sucha	5,594	25.62	-5.95
Alberta Party	Bronson Ha	1,331	6.10	+4.72
Liberal	Vesna Samardzija	290	1.33	-3.30
Green	John Daly	212	0.97	+0.12
Alberta Independence	Jarek Bucholc	146	0.67	–
Total		21,834	99.16	–
Rejected, spoiled and declined		186	0.84	
Turnout		22,020	68.39	
Eligible voters		32,198		
United Conservative notional hold		Swing		+4.85
Source(s) Source: "2019 Provincial General Election Report" (PDF). Elections Alberta.

2022 United Conservative Party leadership election
Candidate	Round 1		Round 2		Round 3		Round 4		Round 5		Round 6	
Candidate	Votes	%	Votes	%	Votes	%	Votes	%	Votes	%	Votes	%
Danielle Smith	34,949	41.3	34,981	41.4	35,095	41.7	38,496	46.2	39,270	47.7	42,423	53.77
Travis Toews	24,831	29.4	25,054	29.7	25,593	30.4	26,592	31.9	30,794	37.4	36,480	46.23
Brian Jean	9,301	11.1	9,504	11.3	10,157	12.1	11,251	13.5	12,203	14.8	Eliminated	
Rebecca Schulz	5,835	6.9	6,180	7.3	6,784	8.0	6,972	8.4	Eliminated			
Todd Loewen	6,496	7.7	6,512	7.7	6,596	7.8	Eliminated					
Rajan Sawhney	1,787	2.1	2,246	2.7	Eliminated							
Leela Aheer	1,394	1.6	Eliminated									
Total	84,593	100.00	84,405	100.00	84,225	100.00	83,3177	100.00	82,267	100.00	78,903	100.00
