= ATCO =

Canadian engineering and energy company

ATCO Ltd.
- Trade name: ATCO Group
- Formerly: Alberta Trailer Company
- Type: Public
- Traded as: TSX: ACO.X (Non-voting); TSX: ACO.Y (Voting)
- Industry: Electricity generation and distribution, natural gas, construction, logistics
- Founded: 1947
- Founders: S. Don Southern & Ron Southern
- Headquarters: Calgary, Alberta, Canada
- Key people: Nancy Southern (CEO)
- Number of employees: 7,500 (2022)
- Website: www.atco.com

ATCO Ltd., operating as the ATCO Group, is a publicly-traded Canadian engineering, logistics and energy holding company based in Calgary, Alberta. ATCO's subsidiaries include electric utilities, natural gas production and distribution companies, and construction companies.

== Subsidiaries ==
The ATCO Group of Companies includes the following subsidiaries:

- Canadian Utilities, with its subsidiaries
- ATCO Australia - Established in 2010. 'In July 2011, ATCO purchased the largest reticulated gas infrastructure in Western Australia through the acquisition of Western Australia Gas Networks. The $1.1 billion AUD purchase of what is now called ATCO Gas Australia, is one of the largest acquisitions in ATCO's history. ATCO Gas Australia is a gas distribution utility that serves the Perth metropolitan area and major towns and cities throughout the state of Western Australia. Its combined networks constitute approximately 13,100 km of natural gas pipelines connecting more than 650,000 customers ... ATCO Australia also includes ATCO Power Australia, which has two power stations operating in Adelaide and Karratha. In January 2011, these plants were transferred from ATCO Power, based in Calgary, Alberta, Canada, which operates 15 power generating facilities in Canada and the United Kingdom. While not part of ATCO Australia, ATCO Structures & Logistics is an important part of ATCO's Australian operations with three manufacturing facilities and five office locations in the country.'
- ATCO Energy Solutions (natural gas processing and storage)
- ATCO Power (electricity generation)
- ATCO Energy (natural gas & electricity retailer, and home services provider in Alberta.)
- ATCO Mexico - Established in 2014. (natural gas, electricity, power generation and structure and logistics)
- ATCO Structures (manufactures, leases, and sells modular buildings;)
- ATCO Frontec (workforce camp services, operational support, facilities management and disaster response)

=== Canadian Utilities ===
Canadian Utilities Limited
- Type: Public
- Traded as: TSX: CU
- Industry: Electric Utilities
- Headquarters: Calgary, Canada
- Key people: Nancy Southern (CEO)
- Revenue: ▼3,796 billion CAD (2023)
- Net income: ▲717 million CAD (2023)
- Total assets: ▲23,158 billion CAD (2023)
- Number of employees: 8,000 (2023)
- Parent: ATCO
- Website: www.canadian-utilities.com

Canadian Utilities Limited, a member of the ATCO Group of companies, is a Canada-based worldwide organization of companies with around $22 billion in assets and more than 8,000 employees.

Canadian Utilities has three business units:

- ATCO Energy Systems (previously Utilities): electricity and natural gas transmission and distribution, and international electricity operations. Areas served include northern and central-eastern Alberta, the Yukon, the Northwest Territories, the Lloydminster area of Saskatchewan, and international energy users. Its subsidiaries include:
  - ATCO Electric: an electric utility company based in Edmonton, Alberta that transmits and distributes electricity to two thirds of Alberta, namely in north and east-central Alberta, as well as communities in Yukon and the Northwest Territories. ATCO Electric Yukon, formerly Yukon Electrical Company Limited (YECL), is a private electrical utility based in Whitehorse, Yukon, serving most Yukon communities and Lower Post, British Columbia. The company was founded in 1901. Though it owns one hydro-electric and a number of diesel generating facilities of its own, it purchases most of its power wholesale from the Yukon Energy Corporation and distributes it to consumers. From 1987 to 1997, it operated the services of Yukon Energy under contract, but in 1997, the Yukon government chose not to renew the arrangement; Yukon Energy established its own offices for management and customer service, while YECL continued to operate its own facilities.
  - LUMA Energy LLC (50 per cent ownership with Quanta Services), international electricity operations.
  - ATCO Gas
  - ATCO Pipelines
  - ATCO Gas Australia
- ATCO EnPower (previously Energy Infrastructure): energy storage, electricity generation, industrial water solutions, renewables and 'next energy' - including hydrogen, ammonia, hydro, liquefied natural gas, natural gas, and carbon capture. Areas served include Alberta, the Yukon, the Northwest Territories, Ontario, Australia, Mexico, and Chile. Its subsidiaries include:
  - ATCO Renewables (previously ATCO Power)
  - ATCO Next Energy (previously ATCO Energy Solutions)
  - ATCO Power Australia
- ATCO Energy: electricity and natural gas retail sales, and whole-home and business solutions. Includes Canadian Utilities Limited Corporate, and Other segments.

Canadian Utilities' controlling share owner is the Southern family.

== History ==
ATCO was founded in 1947, by S. Don Southern who gave a minority stake to his son Ron Southern, under the name Alberta Trailer Hire, renting fifteen utility trailers in the Calgary area. As the company's operations grew, they also began to sell trailers, first becoming the Alberta Trailer Company, then ATCO. By the early 1960s, the company had operations across North America and in Australia.

ATCO Industries Ltd. became a public company in March 1968, with shares traded on the Toronto Stock Exchange. During the 1970s, the company expanded into the natural gas and petroleum industries, and into the electricity industry in the 1980s.

In 2004, with the deregulation of the retail energy industry in Alberta, ATCO sold the retail operations of ATCO Gas and ATCO Electric to Direct Energy Marketing Ltd. (DEML) while ATCO Gas and ATCO Electric still operated as "distributors" (owning and operating the infrastructure that delivers natural gas or electricity in its service territories). As part of the sale to DEML, DEML contracted call center and billing services from ATCO I-Tek. In 2016, ATCO re-entered the retail energy industry in Alberta as ATCO Energy and in 2025 added home services as a service offering.

In 2018, ATCO acquired 40% of the shares in Neltume Ports, a South American port terminal operator.

In 2022, ATCO agreed to pay a fine after overcharging for work on a new transmission line.
