= Cindy Ady =

Canadian politician

The Honourable Cindy Ady ECA
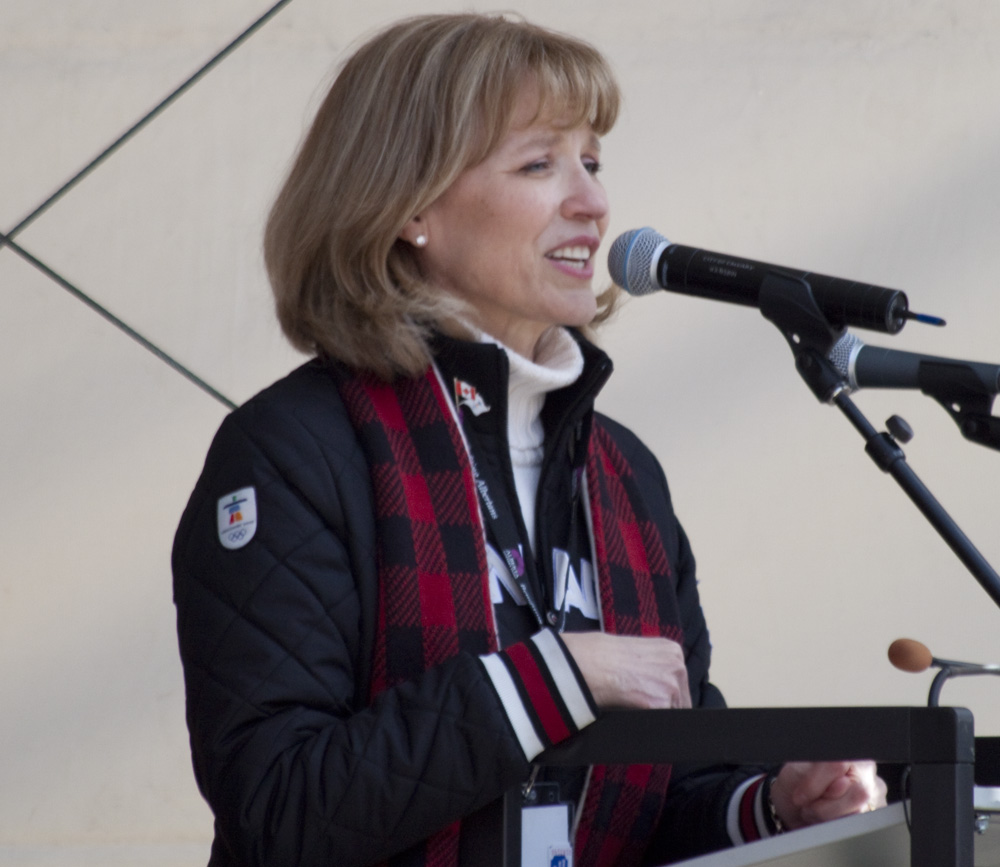
- Cindy Ady speaking at a salute to Alberta Olympic and Paralympic athletes held in Calgary on April 5, 2010

MLA for Calgary-Shaw
- In office March 15, 2001 – April 23, 2012
- Preceded by: Jon Havelock

Former Minister of Tourism, Parks and Recreation in the Alberta government
- In office March 13, 2008 – October 12, 2011
- Preceded by: New portfolio
- Succeeded by: Jack Hayden (politician)

Former Associate Minister of Tourism Promotion in the Alberta government
- In office June 21, 2007 – March 13, 2008
- Preceded by: New portfolio
- Succeeded by: Portfolio terminated

Personal details
- Born: Cindy Lou Ady; 1956 or 1957 (age 69–70) San Antonio, Texas, United States
- Party: Progressive Conservative
- Spouse: Don Ady
- Children: Four sons: Brent, Justin, Jeffrey, Scott
- Education: Brigham Young University
- Occupation: Consultant
- Website: http://www.cindyady.com

Cindy Lou Ady ECA is a Canadian politician and was a member of the Legislative Assembly of Alberta. She served in this capacity from the 2001 provincial election, being re-elected in both the 2004 provincial election and 2008 provincial election, until the 2012 election, sitting as a Progressive Conservative. From 2008 to 2011, she served as the Minister of the Tourism, Parks and Recreation department in the Ed Stelmach government. On March 5, 2012, Ady announced that she would not seek re-election in the upcoming provincial general election.

== Early life ==
Ady was born in San Antonio, Texas and attended Brigham Young University from 1975 until 1979, where she studied Communications. She owned a custom home construction business and was later, after moving to Canada, a self-employed community development consultant. In this capacity she developed a business plan and funding proposal for Centennial High School, which opened in 2004.

== Political career ==
=== Electoral record ===
Ady first sought public office in the 2001 provincial election in the constituency of Calgary-Shaw. In that election, she received 80.7% of the vote. In 2004, she was re-elected with 63.4% of the vote, receiving the greatest percentage of the popular vote in Calgary next to Art Johnston, who garnered 63.8%. In the 2008 provincial election, Ady won her seat again, receiving 58.2% of the vote: the largest percentage of the popular vote of any elected Calgary MLA.

=== Backbencher ===
Ady started off as a backbencher in the Ralph Klein government. During her first term, she sponsored the St. Mary's College Amendment Act, a private bill that allowed St. Mary's College to become a university college and grant degrees after being passed without objection. During her second term she sponsored a pair of government bills. The Pharmacy and Drug Amendment Act, which passed with all-party support, changed the regulatory regime faced by pharmacies and eliminated the requirement that doctors' prescriptions include a precise amount to be prescribed, to allow pharmacists some discretion on the question. The Personal Directives Amendment Act amended the province's statute involving personal directives - a written instruction on personal matters to be brought into effect in the event of the director's incapacity - to allow them to be suspended in the event that somebody making one regains capacity. It too passed with all-party support.

=== Minister ===
On June 21, Premier Ed Stelmach appointed Ady Associate Minister of Tourism Promotion as part of an effort to put more Calgarians in cabinet after his party lost the riding of Calgary Elbow to Liberal Craig Cheffins. After the 2008 election, she was promoted to a full minister, of Tourism, Parks and Recreation. In this capacity, she sponsored the Travel Alberta Act, which would establish Travel Alberta, hitherto a government department, as a statutory corporation. Ady has a strong record in terms of attendance in the legislature for Members. Her absenteeism is one of the lowest for all MLAs and Ministers. Ady's accessibility and use of resources to keep the public informed on key issues has been praised. In October, 2011, she was replaced as Minister of Tourism, Parks and Recreation by Jack Hayden (politician).

=== Olympics ===
Minister Ady attended the 2010 Vancouver Winter Olympic Games, representing the Government of Alberta. Part of the government's advertising was showcased through exclusive booking of the Rocky Mountaineer, which did runs between Vancouver and Whistler. As part of her role as Minister for Tourism, Parks and Recreation, Ady also helped host a provincial pavilion known as Alberta House, at the corner of Beaty and Robson Streets in Vancouver. Some estimates have pegged the return on investment for the whole marketing project to be near $70 million, versus the $7 million initial investment. The Government of Alberta official report stated that the media exposure and return generated was worth nearly $70 million.

=== Post-Olympic Recreation Promotion ===
Following the 2010 Vancouver Winter Olympics, Minister Ady supported the establishment of an Olympic Legacy Network. Ady stated that the project looked to utilize, "...opportunities to use our Olympic legacies for the long-term benefit of sport and tourism." The project has already had success with the December 2010 Alberta/British Columbia Joint Legacy Event. This event hosted the World Championships for bobsleigh and skeleton racing in 2010.

== Personal life ==
Ady is married to Don Ady, son of former Cardston and Cardston-Chief Mountain MLA Jack Ady, whom she identifies as her political hero. The pair has four sons: Brent, Jeffrey, Justin, and Scott. They currently reside in south Calgary, within her riding of Calgary-Shaw. Ady is an active member of the Church of Jesus Christ of Latter-day Saints.

== Election results ==
2001 Alberta general election: Calgary-Shaw
Party	Candidate	Votes	%	±%
Progressive Conservative	Cindy Ady	20,306	80.72%	5.43%
Liberal	Jim McPherson	3,595	14.29%	-3.21%
New Democratic	Ryan Falkenberg	729	2.90%	-0.07%
Alberta First	Peter Singleton	222	0.88%	–
Independent	Kevin Agar	153	0.61%	–
Independent	Darren Popik	151	0.60%	–
Total		25,156	–	–
Rejected, spoiled and declined		33	19	3
Eligible electors / turnout		49,366	51.03%	1.62%
Progressive Conservative hold		Swing		4.32%
Source(s) Source: "Calgary-Shaw Official Results 2001 Alberta general election". Alberta Heritage Community Foundation.

2004 Alberta general election: Calgary-Shaw
Party	Candidate	Votes	%	±%
Progressive Conservative	Cindy Ady	6,735	63.44%	-17.28%
Liberal	John Roggeveen	2,410	22.70%	8.41%
Alberta Alliance	Barry Chase	620	5.84%	–
Green	Rick Papineau	381	3.59%	–
New Democratic	Jarrett Young	300	2.83%	-0.07%
Separation	Daniel W. Doherty	170	1.60%	–
Total		10,616	–	–
Rejected, spoiled and declined		13	66	4
Eligible electors / turnout		26,408	40.26%	-10.77%
Progressive Conservative hold		Swing		-12.84%
Source(s) Source: "Calgary-Shaw Statement of Official Results 2004 Alberta general election" (PDF). Elections Alberta.

2008 Alberta general election results ( Calgary-Shaw )		Turnout 39.9%	
Affiliation	Candidate	Votes	%
Progressive Conservative	Cindy Ady	7,122	51.2%
Liberal	John Roggeveen	3,002	24.5%
Wildrose Alliance	Richard Dur	1,282	10.5%
Green	Jennifer Oss-Saunders	499	4.1%
NDP	Jenn Carlson	335	2.7%
