= Shawnessy station =

Light rail station in Calgary, Alberta, Canada

Shawnessy
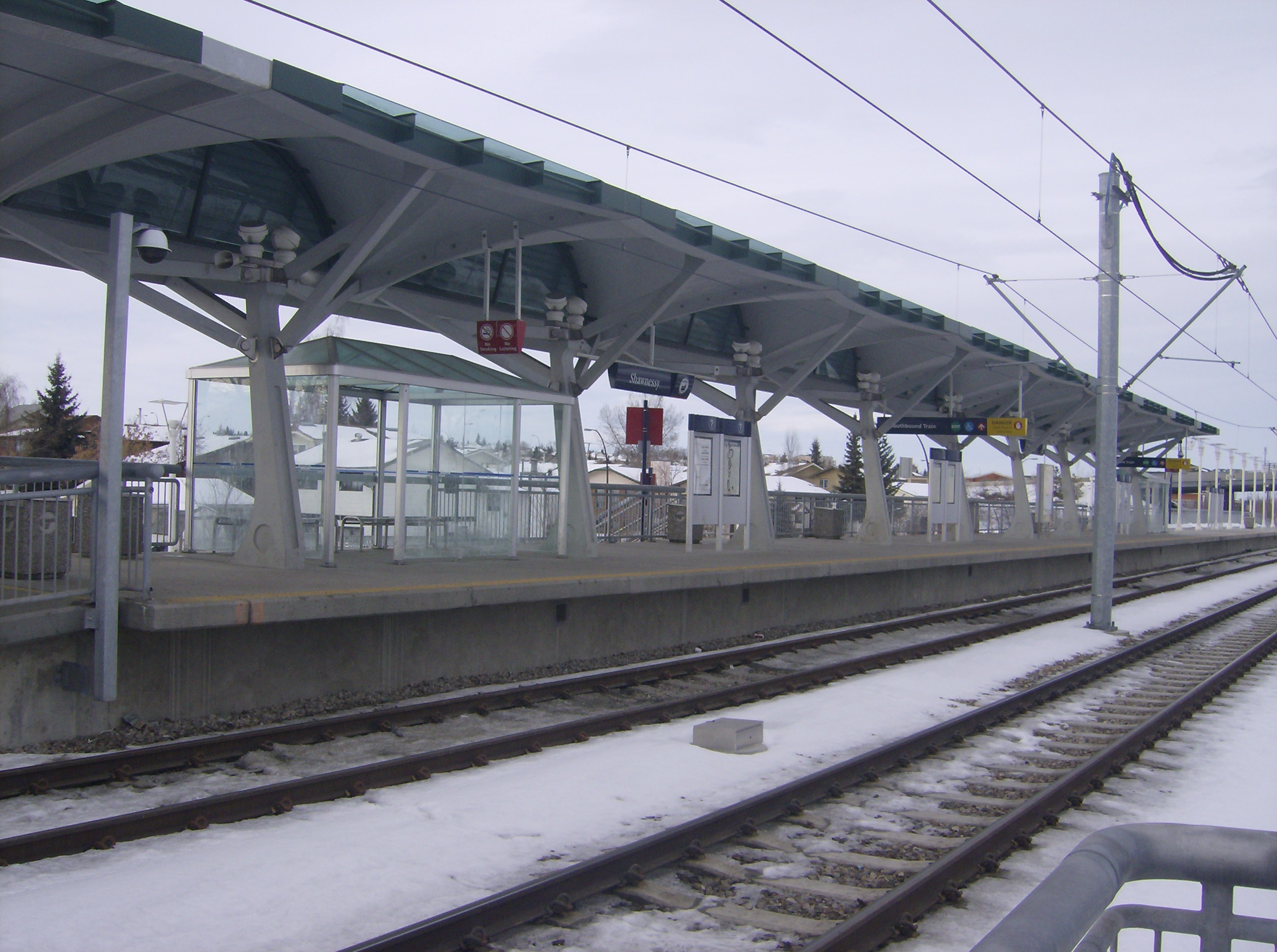

General information
- Location: 17 Shawville Blvd. SW
- Coordinates: 50°54′38″N 114°04′14″W
- Owner: Calgary Transit
- Platforms: Staggered side-loading platforms
- Connections: 11 Southwest Loop; 12 Southwest Loop; 52 Somerset/Evergreen; 102 Millrise/Silverado

Construction
- Structure type: At-grade
- Parking: 206 spaces
- Accessible: yes

History
- Opened: 2004; 22 years ago

Services
Preceding station	Calgary Transit	Following station
Fish Creek–Lacombe toward Tuscany	Red Line	Somerset–Bridlewood Terminus
Location

Shawnessy is a CTrain light rail station in Shawnessy, Calgary, Alberta. It serves the South Red Line (Route 201). It is located on the exclusive LRT right of way (adjacent to the CPR ROW). The station is 16 km (9.9 mi) south of the City Hall interlocking.

It, along with Sommerset-Bridlewood station opened on June 28, 2004 as part of the South LRT Extension Phase II. The station is located along Shawville Boulevard and is adjacent to its neighbourhood and its shopping district.

The station's side-loading platforms are staggered with a pedestrian level-crossing in between, allowing commuters to cross the tracks. The east platform serves the northbound Red Line which passes through downtown, ending at Tuscany station. The west platform serves the southbound Red Line to its final stop, Somerset-Bridlewood station.

The station platforms were originally built to accommodate four-car-length trains.

In 2005, the station registered an average of 3,900 boardings per weekday.

== Transit connections ==
Bus connections to Shawnessy station as of 31 August, 2026:

- 11 - Southwest Loop (Clockwise)
- 12 - Southwest Loop (Counterclockwise)
- 52 - Evergreen (North) / 52 Somerset-Bridlewood (South)
- 102 - Milrise (North) / 102 Silverado (South)
