= Walden, Calgary =

Walden
- Neighbourhood
- Location of Walden in Alberta
- Coordinates: 50°52′16″N 114°01′30″W
- Country: Canada
- Province: Alberta
- City: Calgary
- Quadrant: SE
- Ward: 14
- Established: 2007
- Annexed: 2005

Government
  - Mayor: Jeromy Farkas
  - Administrative body: Calgary City Council
  - Councillor: Landon Johnston (Independent)

Population
  - Total: 935
- Time zone: Mountain
- Website: https://genstar.com/our_communities/walden/

Walden is a residential neighbourhood in the southeast quadrant of Calgary, Alberta. It is located near the southern edge of the city, south of 194 Avenue SE and the neighbourhood of Chaparral. To the east it is bordered by the Bow River Valley, to the south by the neighbourhood of Legacy, and to the west by Macleod Trail.

Developed by Genstar, Walden was officially approved by Calgary City Council in July 2007, with construction expected to commence in 2008.

The neighbourhood covers 620 acres (2.5 km^{2}), and is named after Walden, a book by Henry David Thoreau.

When completed, Walden will consist of three "villages", a 160-acre (0.65 km^{2}) park system. Walden falls within Ward 14 and is represented on City Council by a councillor.

== Demographics ==
In the City of Calgary's 2012 municipal census, Walden had a population of 935 living in 450 dwellings, a 57.4% increase from its 2011 population of 594. With a land area of 2.4 km^{2} (0.93 sq mi), it had a population density of 390/km^{2} (1,009/sq mi) in 2012.

== Transit ==
Walden is served by Calgary Transit Bus Routes 444 (now defunct), 167 and 168 (also defunct). It is also served by Route 78 to the northern edge of Walden, namely, near 194 Avenue SE.

== See also ==
- List of neighbourhoods in Calgary
