= Spruce Meadows =

Multi-purpose sports facility near Calgary

- Interactive map of Spruce Meadows
- Address: 18011 Spruce Meadows Way SW
- Location: Foothills County, Alberta
- Coordinates: 50°53′06″N 114°06′02″W
- Owner: Spruce Meadows
- Surface: Grass, sand, pavement

Construction
- Opened: 1975
- Expanded: 2019

Tenant
- Cavalry FC (CPL) (2019–present)

Website
- www.sprucemeadows.com

Spruce Meadows is a multi-purpose sports facility near Calgary, Alberta built by the Southern family which opened in 1975.

The facility contains an equestrian show jumping complex that comprises 505 acres (2.04 km^{2}). The current president and CEO of Spruce Meadows is Linda Southern-Heathcott, a former Olympian who competed in the 1996 Atlanta Summer Games for the Canadian Olympic Team.

The facility is also the home venue of Cavalry FC of the Canadian Premier League, a soccer team owned by Spruce Meadows Sports and Entertainment. The 6,000-seat stadium, known as ATCO Field for sponsorship reasons during soccer use, is within the facility. The field was constructed in early 2019 at the site of a modified jumping field, which gained new stands to fit the rectangular soccer pitch.

== Tournaments ==
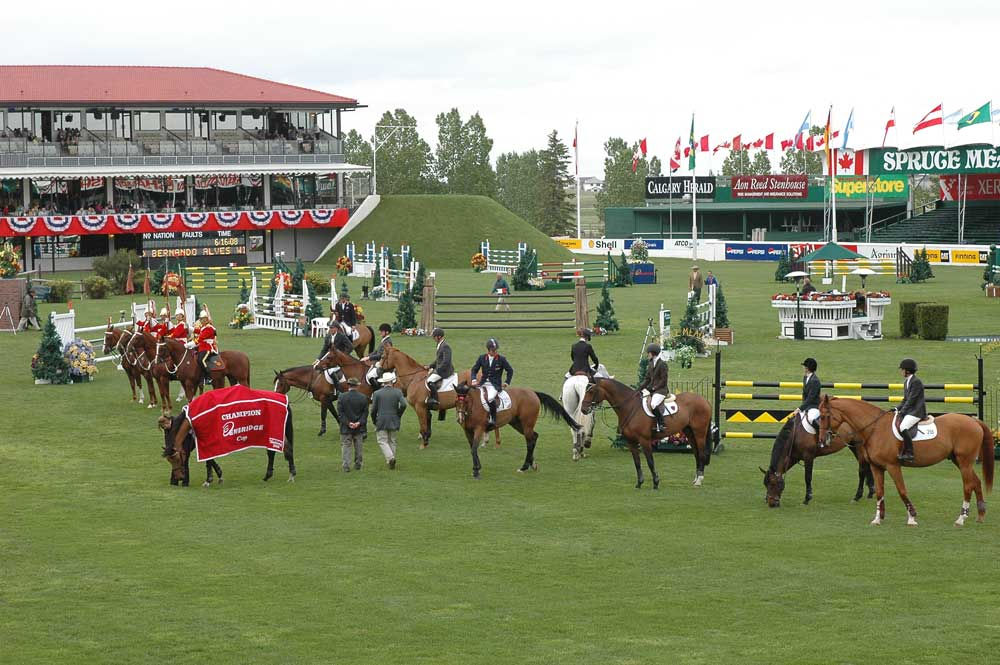
"National" Award Ceremony at Spruce Meadows

There are six major outdoor tournaments and eight indoor tournaments at Spruce Meadows annually. The indoor tournaments are known as the 'Nakoda Series' and are tailored for developing junior/amateur competitors. The outdoor tournaments start with the 'Summer Series' a five-week-long tour that comprises the following tournaments: beginning in June with the CSI 'National', the CSI 'Continental', the CSI 'Pan American', and then the CSI 'North American' in July. The outdoor season culminates in the CSIO Spruce Meadows 'Masters' Tournament in September. Each tournament is well-recognized and attracts a wide array of athletes and their horses from around the world. Spruce Meadows was named number one show jumping facility in the world in 2001–02 and 2003–04.

Spruce Meadows breeds, trains, and sells Hanoverian horses, and holds an annual "Name the Foal" contest, in which three foals are selected to be named by the public. The contest is very popular, and when the Canadian Broadcasting Corporation televises the tournaments, each foal from "Name the Foal" is individually profiled.

== Soccer stadium ==
In 2017, the Canadian Premier League (CPL), with plans to begin play in 2019; in May 2018, the CPL announced that the Southern family had been granted a franchise – Cavalry FC – with a 6,000 seat soccer stadium to be built on the "Meadows on the Green" ring at Spruce Meadows. The field was designed so as to continue hosting equestrian events as well. A 4,500 seat covered grandstand was built on the east side of the stadium, along with 1,500 seats in other areas. It was designed to be modular to allow for future growth. On May 4, 2019 Cavalry FC officially opened the stadium in its inaugural CPL match, an eventual 2–1 victory over York 9 FC in snowy conditions.

== History ==
Construction of Spruce Meadows began in 1973, with the opening in 1975 and first equestrian tournament in 1976. It hosts 500,000 visitors annually and has the stable capacity for 1,000 horses. Spruce Meadows is open for visitors 365 days of the year. It is an all-season facility that hosts conventions and trade shows as well as show-jumping and dressage events. Spruce Meadows has a television production facility that produces Spruce Meadows Chronicles, a show-jumping related TV series that is broadcast to over 100 countries, in addition to other specials and programs.

In May 2018, it was announced that Spruce Meadows were behind a new Canadian Premier League soccer club, Cavalry FC, who will play at their facility in a modular, 5,000-seat stadium starting in 2019.

In late December 2018 Construction began on a new 4,000 seat covered grandstand on the eastern edge of the Meadows on the Green horse ring. The stadium will feature 2,000 additional temporary seats during soccer matches.

In late January 2019 the capacity of the grandstand was updated to be 4,500 seats, with a further 1,500 split between the north and south ends of the pitch.

=== Recent concerns ===
Recently, the Southern family, who have owned the facility since its inception, have become vocal regarding the encroaching city development—once several kilometres outside of town, Spruce Meadows is now located adjacent to the residential neighbourhoods of Bridlewood and Somerset, with a third, Silverado, now partly constructed. Effective January 1, 2011 Spruce Meadows ceased to be within the City of Calgary in a deal with the MD of Foothills. The City of Calgary annexed approximately 176.25 acres of land located northeast of the Sirocco Golf Course from the MD of Foothills. The MD of Foothills annexed approximately 138.45 acres of land situated between Highway 22X and the then municipal boundary.

In the late 1990s, the Southerns successfully lobbied the City of Calgary to rename the stretch of Highway 22X that runs north of the facility from Marquis of Lorne Trail to Spruce Meadows Trail.

== See also ==
- CSIO Spruce Meadows 'Masters' Tournament
