= Sundance, Calgary =

Sundance
- Neighbourhood
- Location of Sundance in Calgary
- Coordinates: 50°54′05″N 114°02′33″W
- Country: Canada
- Province: Alberta
- City: Calgary
- Quadrant: SE
- Ward: 14
- Established: 1982

Government
  - Mayor: Jeromy Farkas
  - Administrative body: Calgary City Council
  - Councillor: Landon Johnston (Independent)

Area
  - Total: 3.4 km^{2} (1.3 sq mi)
- Elevation: 1,040 m (3,410 ft)

Population (2011)
  - Total: 10,623
  - Average Income: $91,623
- Website: Sundance Community Association

Sundance is a residential neighbourhood in the southeast quadrant of Calgary, Alberta. It is located east of Macleod Trail, is bounded to the north and east by Midnapore and Fish Creek Provincial Park and to the south by Stoney Trail. The 33-acre (130,000 m^{2}) man-made Sundance Lake was constructed in the middle of the community, and residents have easy access to the public beach of Sikome Lake.

Sundance was established in 1982. It is represented in the Calgary City Council by the Ward 14 councillor.

== Demographics ==
In the City of Calgary's 2012 municipal census, Sundance had a population of 10,499 living in 3,406 dwellings, a 1.2% decrease from its 2011 population of 10,623. With a land area of 4 km^{2} (1.5 sq mi), it had a population density of 2,600/km^{2} (6,800/sq mi) in 2012.

Residents in this community had a median household income of $91,623 in 2000, and there were 5% low income residents living in the neighbourhood. As of 2000, 14.6% of the residents were immigrants. A proportion of 3.1% of the buildings were condominiums or apartments, and 6.5% of the housing was used for renting.

== Education ==
Schools in Sundance

There are two public elementary schools; Fish Creek Elementary School, and Sundance Elementary School.

There is one public junior high; MidSun Junior High.

There is one public high school; Centennial High School.

There is one Catholic (Separate) School; Father James Whelihan School (kindergarten to Grade 9).

== See also ==
- List of neighbourhoods in Calgary
