= Silverado, Calgary =

Silverado
- Neighbourhood
- Location of Silverado in Calgary
- Coordinates: 50°53′09″N 114°04′15″W
- Country: Canada
- Province: Alberta
- City: Calgary
- Quadrant: SW
- Ward: 13
- Established: 2005
- Annexed: 1984

Government
  - Mayor: Jeromy Farkas
  - Administrative body: Calgary City Council
  - Councillor: Dan McLean (Communities First)
- Elevation: 1,065 m (3,494 ft)

Population (2008)
  - Total: 1,308
- Time zone: UTC9 (MST)
- Website: Silverado community homepage

Silverado is a residential neighbourhood in the southwest quadrant of Calgary, Alberta. It is located near the southern edge of the city, south of Stoney Trail, east of the equestrian sports facility Spruce Meadows, West of Sheriff King Street and North of 194 Avenue S.W.

Silverado is represented in the Calgary City Council by the Ward 13 councillor.

== Development controversy ==
Prior to the commencement of development of Silverado, the owners of nearby Spruce Meadows pushed for a wetlands development to be established between the residential area and the show-jumping facility. Calgary City Council approved the wetlands proposal in 2004, along with a request that one of the major roads leading into Spruce Meadows not be upgraded to a residential collector street, although Spruce Meadows was unsuccessful in getting the city to increase the setback between Silverado and the facility.

Construction of homes in the community began in 2005.

== Demographics ==
In the City of Calgary's 2012 municipal census, Silverado had a population of 5,136 living in 1,898 dwellings, an 18.4% increase from its 2011 population of 4,337. With a land area of 5.1 km^{2} (2.0 sq mi), it had a population density of 1,007/km^{2} (2,608/sq mi) in 2012.

== LRT network expansion ==
Two new LRT stations at Silverado at 210 Avenue are planned for a future extension of the Red Line (Calgary) however the City of Calgary has not established any timelines or funding for this expansion.

== See also ==
- List of neighbourhoods in Calgary
