= Progressive Tory Party of Alberta =

Provincial political party in Canada

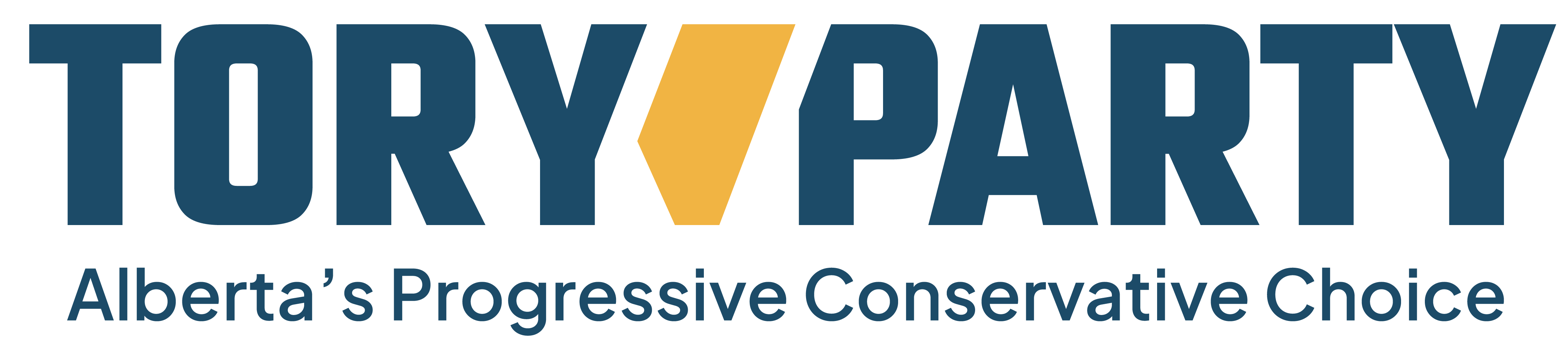
- Abbreviation: PTPA, TORY
- Leader: Peter Guthrie
- President: Savanah Bosch
- Founded: September 24, 1985; December 18, 2025 (Progressive Tory)
- Preceded by: Alberta Party (1998—2025); Alliance Party of Alberta (1990—1998); Alberta Political Alliance (1985—1989)
- Headquarters: Stn Main, PO Box 1045 Edmonton, Alberta T5J 2M1
- Membership (2018): 6,543
- Ideology: Progressive conservatism; Red Toryism; Canadian federalism
- Political position: Centre to centre-right 2009—2025: Centre; 1985—2009: Right-wing
- Colours: Blue (official); Yellow (official); Sky blue (customary)
- Seats in Legislature: 1 / 87

Website
- albertatory.ca

The Progressive Tory Party of Alberta, formerly the Alberta Party from 1998 to 2025, is a political party in the province of Alberta, Canada. The Alberta Party described itself as centrist and pragmatic in that it is not dogmatically ideological in its approach to politics.

On December 18, 2025, the party changed its name to the Progressive Tory Party of Alberta.

== As the Alberta Party ==
=== Founding ===
In the early 1980s, the right side of Alberta's political spectrum was fragmented by parties spawned in the wake of the National Energy Program and feelings that Premier Peter Lougheed had done little to prevent the economic collapse they believe it had caused. Some of these parties had already achieved some small success in attaining seats in the Legislative Assembly of Alberta, though in the 1982 general election Social Credit, the Alberta Reform Movement and the Western Canada Concept lost their representation in the Legislature.

In 1985, the party was founded as the Alberta Political Alliance Party and became a registered party with Elections Alberta. It was organized as an alliance of three right-wing political parties: the Alberta Social Credit Party, Western Canada Concept and the Heritage Party of Alberta. However, this alliance did not last long as the Western Canada Concept and The Heritage Party ran candidates individually in the 1986 election, and many former Social Credit supporters moved to the Representative Party of Alberta, and the Alberta Political Alliance Party ended up not running any candidates.

The party renamed to the Alberta Political Alliance before the 1989 election, however again did not run any candidates.

On October 30, 1990, this alliance of parties gave way to the creation of a new political party, the Alliance Party of Alberta. This change marked a transition away from trying to build a coalition of parties to full participation in electoral politics. The party participated in two by-elections, and fielded a handful of candidates in the 1993 general election but received only a small percentage of the popular vote in each case. The party did not contest the 1997 provincial election.

Alberta Party logo from 1998 to 2008

In 1998, the Alliance Party followed the example of the Saskatchewan Party and the Manitoba Party by changing its name to the Alberta Party Political Association, or the Alberta Party for short.

=== 2000s ===
For the 2001 election, the party formed an electoral coalition with the Social Credit Party.

Shortly before the 2004 election, the Alberta Party attempted to merge with the Alberta Alliance Party (a different organization from the old Alliance Party of Alberta). The merged party would have adopted the Alberta Party platform, and the Alberta Party provincial council would have had seats on the Alberta Alliance Provincial Council. The deal fell through because the Alberta Party would not agree to de-register the Alberta Party name with Elections Alberta.

On October 1, 2004, shortly before the general election, the party shortened its registered name to "Alberta Party" from "the Alberta Party Political Association".

In the 2004 provincial election, the party nominated candidates in four ridings, winning a total of 2,485 votes, or 0.3% of the provincial total. The party fielded one candidate, Margaret Saunter, for the March 3, 2008 provincial election. Saunter placed last out of a field of six candidates in Edmonton-Centre.

In late 2005, talks continued about the party merging with the Alberta Alliance Party; this time also with the Social Credit Party, who the party had an electoral coalition with in 2001. Despite cooperation and successful merger talks between the party leaders, the Social Credit Party membership voted down the motion to merge at the 2006 Social Credit Convention.

The Alberta Alliance Party and Alberta Party held their Annual General Meetings on March 23, 2007 and March 24, 2007, in Edmonton and Red Deer, respectively, to vote on a new party constitution that would have merged the parties. The new party would have kept the Alberta Alliance Party name and Paul Hinman as leader. The Alberta Alliance party membership voted to withhold a potential merger until after the Alberta Party had resolved its legal troubles.

=== Ideological shift and party renewal ===
Alberta Party logo used after the ideological shift from 2009 to 2011

After the rise of the Wildrose Alliance as Alberta's main right-wing alternative to the governing Progressive Conservatives, the right-wing members of the Alberta Party left to join that party. This left a small group of centrists in control of the party. In 2009, former Alberta Greens deputy leader Edwin Erickson, who had been organizing a new "Progress Party", was invited to run as a leadership candidate for the Alberta Party and won by acclamation. In 2010 the Alberta Party board voted to merge with Renew Alberta, a progressive and centrist group that had been organizing to form a new political party.

During the merger process, the party's board agreed to suspend its old policy platform and start anew. To create a new platform different from its more right-wing history, in 2010 the party launched a campaign called "The Big Listen" in order to canvass the public for new policy ideas. The party held its first policy convention on November 13 and 14, 2010 to develop substantive policies from the ideas heard during "The Big Listen". At the convention, Erickson stepped down to make way for an acting leader until a leadership contest could be held. A first set of policies was released on November 23, 2010, to coincide with the announcement of the appointment of an acting leader, Sue Huff. These policies centred on five key areas: economy, health, environment, democratic renewal, and education. On January 24, 2011, former Liberal MLA Dave Taylor announced he was joining the Alberta Party, becoming the party's first MLA.

=== 2010s ===
Alberta Party logo used from 2011 to 2016

The party announced in January 2011 that a leadership convention would be held in Edmonton on May 28, 2011. Four candidates contested the leadership of the party: Glenn Taylor, mayor of Hinton; Tammy Maloney, a social entrepreneur; businessman Randy Royer; and Lee Easton, chair of the English program at Mount Royal University. Chris Tesarski, CEO of Sandbox Energy Corporation, was also a candidate early in the contest. However, on April 15, Tesarski announced that he would not seek the party's leadership, citing disagreements with some aspects of the party's philosophy and some party members' attitudes towards his candidacy. Dave Taylor, the party's only MLA, was also expected to run for the leadership, but did not join the campaign. At the convention, the election was decided on the first ballot when Glenn Taylor won just over 55% of the votes.

The party nominated 38 candidates to run in the 28th Alberta general election. None were elected.

After Glenn Taylor stepped down on September 22, 2012, the party remained without a leader for some months. On May 29, 2013, the party announced that it would be holding a leadership vote to coincide with its Annual General Meeting on September 21, 2013, in Edmonton. Entrepreneur and 2012 Calgary-Elbow election candidate Greg Clark, and self-employed consultant and 2012 Calgary-North West candidate Troy Millington, sought the leadership. Clark won the election, receiving 87% of the 337 votes cast.

=== Greg Clark leadership ===
In the 2015 election, party leader Greg Clark became the first ever MLA to be elected under the Alberta Party banner.

On October 30, 2017, it was announced that former NDP MLA Karen McPherson who had left the Government Caucus earlier in the month would cross to join the Alberta Party as their third ever, and second current MLA. McPherson cited the need to make transformative change in healthcare and management of the economy, as well as the feeling that she could better advocate for her constituents and use her skills and abilities better in the Alberta Party.

In January 2018, former UCP MLA Rick Fraser announced that he would be joining the Alberta Party and running for its leadership race that had been triggered when Greg Clark stepped down. Fraser cited the divisive politics of the UCP for his departure, and the need to find "common sense policies" that "don't divide Albertans, but rather bring them closer together."

Fraser's joining of the Alberta Party tripled the caucus size from the results of the 2015 general election, leaving the Alberta Party as the third largest representation in the Legislature.

=== Stephen Mandel leadership ===
A leadership election was triggered when Greg Clark stepped down as leader on November 18, 2017. The election was held on February 27, 2018, after originally being scheduled to be on February 7. Stephen Mandel became the new leader of the party after achieving 66% of the vote.

The Alberta Party ran a full slate of candidates for the first time. Although the party gained 9.09% of the popular vote, an increase from 2.29% in 2015, it lost all three ridings it held going into the election and won no seats in the Legislature.

=== Decline ===
On June 30, 2019, Stephen Mandel resigned as leader of the Alberta Party. Former PC MLA Jacquie Fenske became the interim leader on February 10, 2020. The Party announced a leadership contest, with a new leader to be elected on October 23, 2021. As only one candidate submitted a valid application by the close of nominations on August 31, 2021, Barry Morishita was acclaimed as leader.

Final Alberta Party logo used until 2025

In the 2023 election, the party only ran 19 candidates and received just 0.71% of the provincewide vote.

On October 15, 2023, Morishita resigned as leader of the party. On April 14, 2024, the party announced that corporate lawyer, Lindsay Amantea, was the new interim leader.

=== Ideology ===
For most of its history, the Alberta Party was a right-wing organization. This was until the rise of the Wildrose Alliance as Alberta's main conservative alternative to the governing Progressive Conservatives attracted away the Alberta Party's more conservative members. This left a small rump of comparatively less conservative members in control of the Alberta Party. In 2010, the Alberta Party board voted to merge with Renew Alberta, a progressive group that had been organizing to form a new political party in Alberta. The Alberta Party thus shed its conservative past for a more centrist political outlook. The party has been cited in The Globe and Mail and The Economist as part of the break in one-party politics in Alberta, with the Economist calling it "a split in Canada’s most powerful right-wing political machine."

== As the Progressive Tory Party ==
In July 2025, it was announced that United Conservative Party (UCP)-turned-independent MLAs Scott Sinclair and Peter Guthrie planned to form a political party called the Progressive Conservatives, reviving the predecessor to the United Conservative Party. Later that month, it was announced that Sinclair and Guthrie would be joining the Alberta Party and rebranding it as the Progressive Conservative Party. However, Sinclair did not end up doing so and returned to the UCP caucus in May 2026.

A special general meeting was held on August 27, 2025, in which the membership decided the future direction of the party. The party voted to change the name to the Alberta Progressive Conservative Party, with 94% of party members in support. On August 29, the party submitted the name change request to Elections Alberta.

On December 9, 2025, Peter Guthrie became the new leader of the party.

On December 18, the party officially changed its name to the Progressive Tory Party of Alberta, after legislative changes passed by the governing United Conservative Party to halt the word "Conservative," among other similar names to currently registered political parties being included in any other political party.

In September 2026, the party received 6% of the vote in the Calgary-Shaw provincial by-election, with Progressive Tory candidate Kyle Joseph finishing third behind the UCP's Mike Derry and the victorious Alberta New Democratic Party candidate Kyle Campbell, but finishing ahead of Alberta Liberal leader John Roggeveen, who came in fourth.

== Leaders ==
Picture	Name	Start	Finish	Notes
	Howard Thompson	1986	1993	
	Mark Waters	1993	1997	
	George Flake	1997	1999	
	Fred Schorning	1999	2001	
	George Flake	2001	2004	Second time as leader.
	Bruce Stubbs	2004	2009	
	Robert Leddy	2009	January 28, 2010	First leader of the ideological shift.
	Edwin Erickson	January 28, 2010	November 22, 2010	Leader for merger with Renew Alberta.
	Sue Huff	November 23, 2010	May 28, 2011	Interim leader.
	Glenn Taylor	May 28, 2011	September 22, 2012	Elected at a convention in Edmonton; stepped down after failing to win a seat in the 2012 Alberta general election.
	Greg Clark	September 21, 2013	February 27, 2018	After remaining leaderless for a year, the party elected Clark at a convention in Edmonton. Clark stepped down as leader on November 18, 2017, and became interim leader until the upcoming leadership election.
	Stephen Mandel	February 27, 2018	June 30, 2019	
	Jacquie Fenske	February 10, 2020	August 31, 2021	Interim Leader
	Barry Morishita	September 1, 2021	October 15, 2023	Morishita, President of the Alberta Urban Municipalities Association (2017–2021) and a former Councillor and Mayor of the City of Brooks, was acclaimed as Leader on September 1, 2021.
	Lindsay Amantea	April 14, 2024	December 9, 2025	Interim Leader and Alberta Party President Policy chair of the Liberal Party of Canada in Alberta.
	Peter Guthrie	December 9, 2025	present	

== Members of the Legislative Assembly ==
Member	District	Tenure	Notes
Dave Taylor	Calgary-Currie	2011–2012	Previously served as a Liberal MLA from 2004–2010 and an independent from 2010–2011.
Greg Clark	Calgary-Elbow	2015–2019	Only MLA to be elected under the Alberta Party banner.
Karen McPherson	Calgary-Mackay-Nose Hill	2017–2019	Previously served as an NDP MLA from 2015–2017 and an independent in 2017.
Rick Fraser	Calgary-South East	2018–2019	Previously served as a PC MLA from 2012–2017, a UCP MLA in 2017, and an independent from 2017–2018.
Peter Guthrie	Airdrie-Cochrane	2025–present	Previously served as a UCP MLA from 2019–2025 and as an independent in 2025.

== Election results ==
Election	Banner	Leader	Candidates	Votes	%	Seats	±	Place	Legislative role	Notes
1993	Alliance Party	Mark Waters	4 / 83	3,548	0.36%	0 / 83	0	▲7th	No seats	PC majority
1997	did not contest									PC majority
2001	Social Credit Party (Note: During the 2001 election, the party formed a coalition with the Social Credit Party.)	Fred Schorning (Note: James Albers was leader of the Social Credit Party, who the Alberta Party was in a coalition with.)	12 / 83	5,361	0.53%	0 / 83	0	▲6th	No seats	PC majority
2004	Alberta Party	Bruce Stubbs	4 / 83	2,485	0.30%	0 / 83	0	▼8th	No seats	PC majority
2008	Alberta Party	Bruce Stubbs	1 / 83	51	0.01%	0 / 83	0	▼9th	No seats	PC majority
2012	Alberta Party	Glenn Taylor	38 / 87	17,172	1.33%	0 / 87	0	▲5th	No seats	PC majority
2015	Alberta Party	Greg Clark	36 / 87	33,867	2.29%	1 / 87	▲1	5th	No status	NDP majority
2019	Alberta Party	Stephen Mandel	87 / 87	170,872	9.08%	0 / 87 (Note: Despite losing all their seats (both elected in 2015 and gained during the 29th legislature), the party did receive the highest number of votes in its history.)	▼3	▲3rd	No seats	UCP majority
2023	Alberta Party	Barry Morishita	19 / 87	12,576	0.71%	0 / 87	0	▼5th	No seats	UCP majority

=== By-elections ===
Banner	By-election	Date	Candidate	Votes	%	Place
Alliance Party	Little Bow	March 5, 1992	Larry Haller	399	7.14%	5/6
Alliance Party	Three Hills	October 26, 1992	Gordon A. Shenton	566	5.47%	5/8
Alberta Party	Calgary-Elbow	October 27, 2014	Greg Clark	3,406	26.88%	2/5
Alberta Party	Edmonton-Whitemud	October 27, 2014	Will Munsey	202	1.43%	5/6
Alberta Party	Calgary-Foothills	October 27, 2014	Michelle Glavine	212	1.79%	6/7
Alberta Party	Calgary-West	October 27, 2014	Troy Millington	264	2.42%	5/5
Alberta Party	Calgary-Foothills	September 3, 2015	Mark Taylor	615	4.83%	5/7
Alberta Party	Innisfail-Sylvan Lake	July 12, 2018	Abigail Douglass	731	7.44%	3/5
Alberta Party	Fort McMurray-Conklin	July 12, 2018	Sid Fayed	103	2.57%	3/5
Alberta Party	Fort McMurray-Lac La Biche	March 15, 2022	Michelle Landsiedel	98	1.68%	5/8
Alberta Party	Brooks-Medicine Hat	November 8, 2022	Barry Morishita	2,098	16.53%	3/5
Alberta Party	Lethbridge-West	December 18, 2024	Layton Veverka	237	1.75%	3/3
Alberta Party	Edmonton-Strathcona	June 23, 2025	Samuel Petrov	115	1.19%	4/6
Alberta Party	Edmonton-Ellerslie	June 23, 2025	Caroline Currie	203	2.39%	5/6
Progressive Tory	Calgary-Shaw	September 14, 2026	Kyle Joseph	978	6.11%	3/5
