= Bridlewood, Calgary =

Bridlewood
- Neighbourhood
- Location of Bridlewood in Calgary
- Coordinates: 50°54′01″N 114°06′22″W
- Country: Canada
- Province: Alberta
- City: Calgary
- Quadrant: SW (Southwest)
- Ward: 13
- Established: 1997

Government
  - Mayor: Jeromy Farkas
  - Administrative body: Calgary City Council
  - Councillor: Dan McLean (Communities First)
- Elevation: 1,100 m (3,600 ft)

Population (2011)
  - Total: 11,641
- Website: Bridlewood Community Association

Bridlewood is a suburban residential neighbourhood in the southwest quadrant of Calgary, Alberta. It is located at the southwestern edge of the city, north of Stoney Trail and south of the community of Evergreen. To the east it borders the Bridlewood Creek Wetland, a wetland created by the City of Calgary as a stormwater retention pond. The Spruce Meadows equestrian facility is located immediately south.

It is represented in the Calgary City Council by the Ward 13 councillor. It belongs to the Calgary-Lougheed provincial electoral district.

== Demographics ==
In the City of Calgary's 2012 municipal census, Bridlewood had a population of 11,835 living in 4,200 dwellings, a 1.7% increase from its 2011 population of 11,641. With a land area of 3.2 km^{2} (1.2 sq mi), it had a population density of 3,700/km^{2} (9,580/sq mi) in 2012.

Residents in this community had a median household income of $70,477 in 2000, and there were 6.2% low income residents living in the neighbourhood. As of 2000, 15.9% of the residents were immigrants. All buildings were single-family detached homes, and 4.3% of the housing was used for renting.

== Education ==
Bridlewood has one Catholic (Monsignor J.J O'Brien), (Grades K-9), one Christian (Glenmore Christian Academy), (Grades K-9) and one public school (Bridlewood Elementary), (Grades K-6).

== See also ==
- List of neighbourhoods in Calgary
