= Chaparral, Calgary =

Chaparral
- Neighbourhood
- Location of Chaparral in Calgary
- Coordinates: 50°53′09″N 114°01′31″W
- Country: Canada
- Province: Alberta
- City: Calgary
- Quadrant: SE
- Ward: 14
- Established: 1995

Government
  - Mayor: Jeromy Farkas
  - Administrative body: Calgary City Council
  - Councillor: Landon Johnston (Independent)
- Elevation: 1,040 m (3,410 ft)

Population (2011)
  - Total: 11,151
  - Average Income: $79,761
- Website: Chaparral Community Association

Chaparral is a residential neighbourhood in the southeast quadrant of Calgary, Alberta. It is located at the southern edge of the city, south of the Stoney Trail. To the east it is bordered by the Bow River Valley, to the south by 194 Avenue SE, and to the west by Macleod Trail. It has three sub sections that are not officially recognized, Lake Chaparral, Chaparral Valley, and Chaparral Ridge.

Chaparral was established in 1995, and named for the mediterranean climate biome. The centrepiece of the neighbourhood is a 32-acre (130,000 m^{2}) artificial lake and a 21-acre (85,000 m^{2}) park with two waterfalls. It is represented in the Calgary City Council by the Ward 14 councillor, who is currently Peter Demong.

== Demographics ==
In the City of Calgary's 2012 municipal census, Chaparral had a population of 11,552 living in 3,759 dwellings, a 3.6% increase from its 2011 population of 11,151. With a land area of 5.4 km^{2} (2.1 sq mi), it had a population density of 2,139/km^{2} (5,540/sq mi) in 2012. As of the 2019 census, the population had increased to 12,654, (in 4,179 dwellings) an increase of 1,102 people or 9.54%.

Residents in this community had a median household income of $79,761 in 2000, and there were 4.4% low income residents living in the neighbourhood. As of 2000, 14.7% of the residents were immigrants. A proportion of 5.2% of the buildings were condominiums or apartments, and 2.4% of the housing was used for renting.

== Education ==
This neighbourhood has one public elementary school: Chaparral Elementary School. (K-6) This neighbourhood has one Catholic elementary school: Saint Sebastian Elementary School. (k-6)

== Transit ==
Chaparral is served by Calgary Transit Bus Route 78 (Sundance/Chaparral), Route 167 (Walden/Legacy), and Route 194 (Chaparral Valley/Wolf Willow).

== See also ==
- List of neighbourhoods in Calgary
