= 2008 Alberta Liberal Party leadership election =

- December 12, 2008
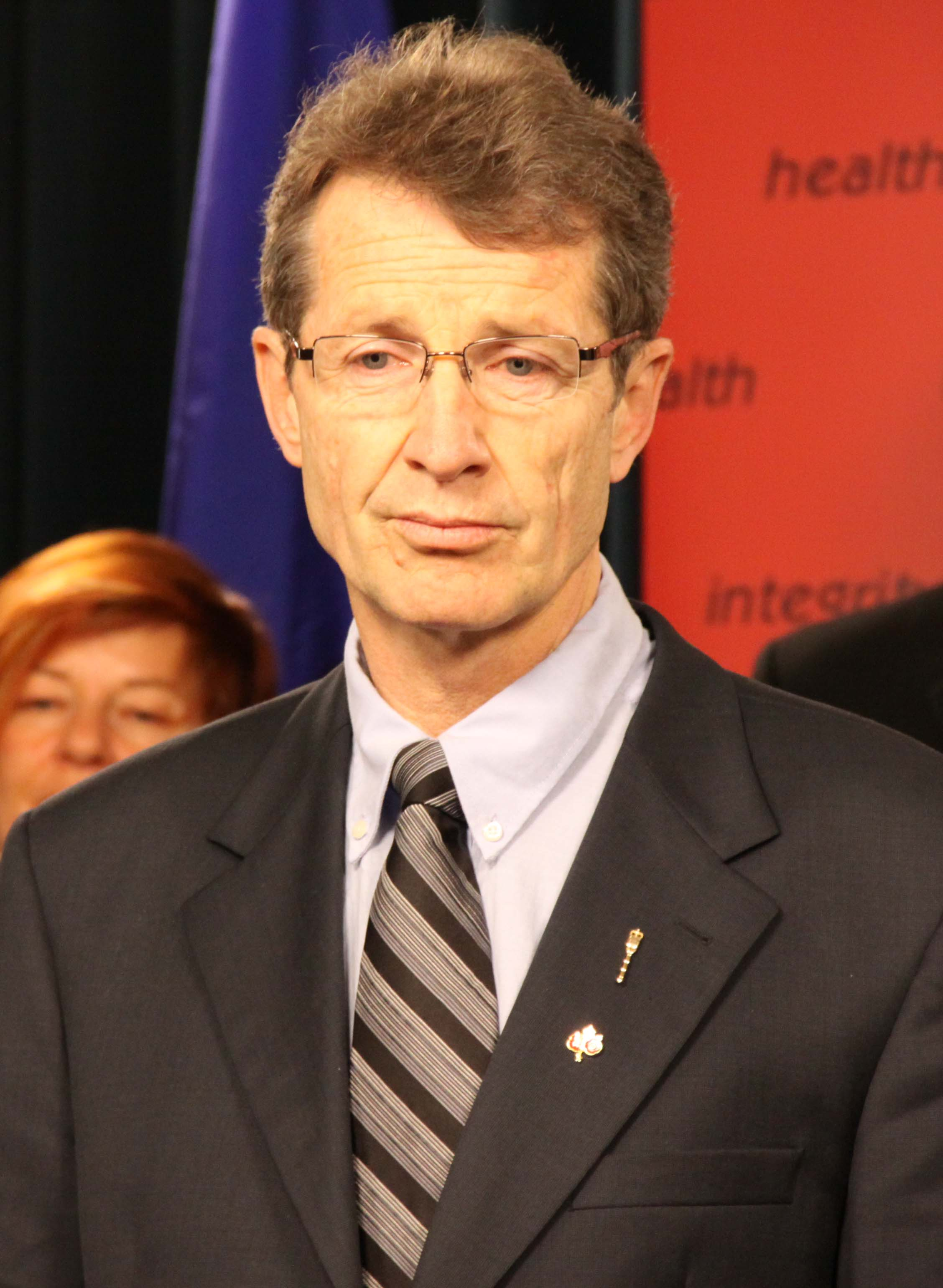

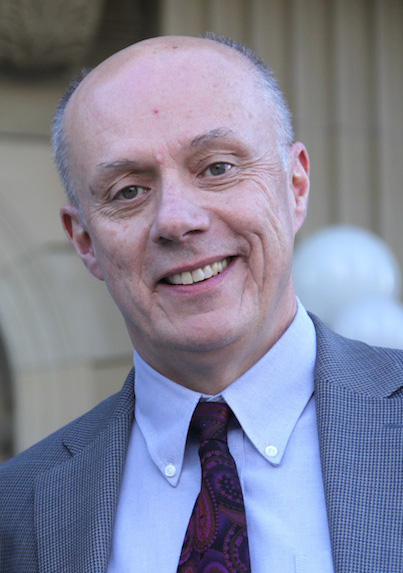
Candidate	David Swann	Dave Taylor	Mo Elsalhy
Party	Liberal	Liberal	Liberal
Popular vote	2,468	1,616	491
Percentage	54.0%	35.3%	10.7%
Leader before election
Kevin Taft
Elected Leader
David Swann

2008 Alberta Liberal Party leadership election
- Date: December 12, 2008
- Resigning leader: Kevin Taft
- Won by: David Swann
- Ballots: 1
- Candidates: 3

The 2008 Alberta Liberal leadership election was held on December 12, 2008, to select a leader of the Alberta Liberal Party. Incumbent leader Kevin Taft announced his resignation June 2008, in the wake of the March provincial election in which the Liberals lost seven of their sixteen seats.

== Candidates ==
Candidates had until September 30 to file nomination papers. Three candidates announced their intentions to run:

- Mo Elsalhy was the MLA for Edmonton McClung from 2004 until 2008, when he was defeated in his re-election attempt by David Xiao.
- David Swann has been the MLA for Calgary Mountain View since 2004.
- Dave Taylor has been the MLA for Calgary Currie since 2004.
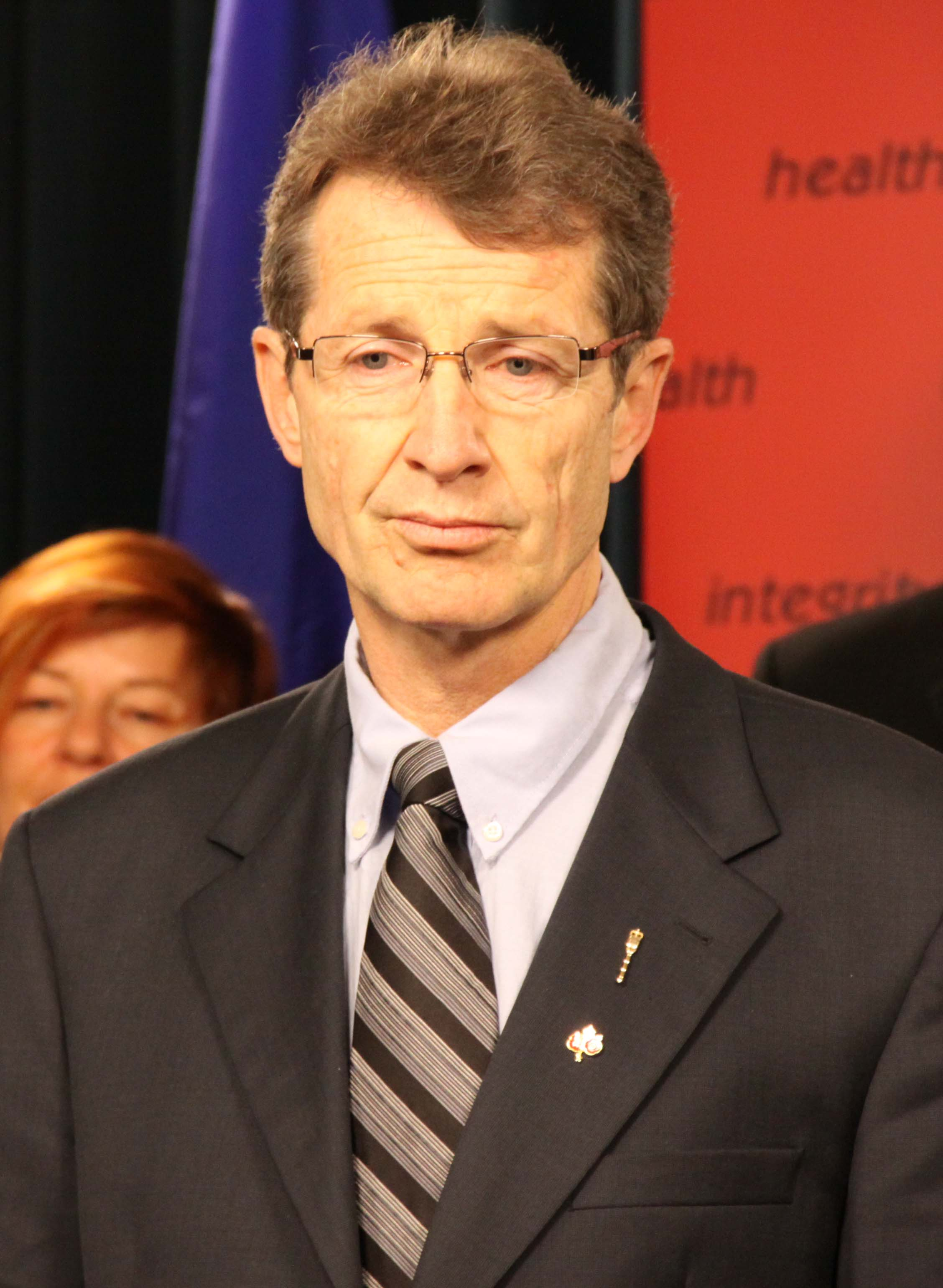
Dr. David Swann

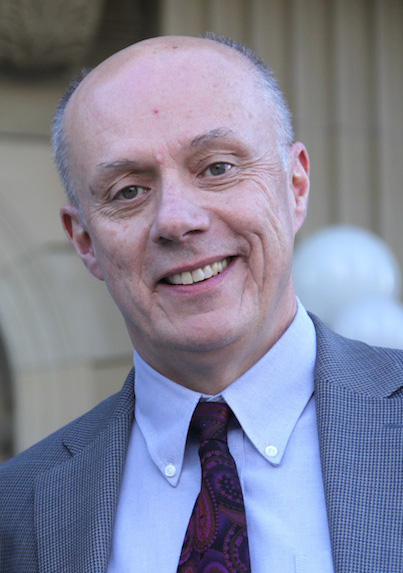
Dave Taylor

=== Declined ===
Hugh MacDonald, Edmonton-Gold Bar MLA since 1997, was at one time considering a candidacy. Laurie Blakeman, MLA for Edmonton Centre since 1997 and Liberal House Leader, had been widely expected to run but in August announced that she would not do so, citing the financial cost of a candidacy. She said that she would not be endorsing a candidate. Other Liberals to publicly decline to run included Calgary mayor Dave Bronconnier and former Deputy Prime Minister Anne McLellan, both of whom announced their intentions immediately following Taft's resignation, and former Edmonton-Rutherford MLA Rick Miller, who expressed concern that, with the next provincial election presumably so far off, he wouldn't have a seat in the legislature for three and a half years after being elected leader.

== Results ==
David Swann was elected leader of the Alberta Liberal Party on the first ballot, receiving more than half of the total votes cast.

Candidate	Votes	Percentage
Swann	2,468	54.0%
Taylor	1,616	35.3%
Elsalhy	491	10.7%
Total	4,575	100.0%
