= Janet Eremenko =

Canadian politician

Janet Eremenko MLA

Member of the Legislative Assembly of Alberta for Calgary-Currie
- Incumbent
- Assumed office May 29, 2023
- Preceded by: Nicholas Milliken

Personal details
- Born: Calgary, Alberta
- Party: NDP
- Education: University of Guelph

Janet Eremenko is a Canadian politician from the Alberta New Democratic Party.

== Political career ==
Eremenko stood in Calgary-Elbow in the 2019 Alberta general election, but came in third place behind the UCP's Doug Schweitzer and the former leader of the Alberta Party, Greg Clark.

For the 2023 Alberta general election, Eremenko defeated former MLA Brian Malkinson by 155 votes to 120 votes for the NDP nomination. In the general election, she was elected as the Member of the Legislative Assembly of Alberta for Calgary-Currie, defeating Minister of Mental Health and Addictions Nicholas Milliken. Eremenko is a member of the Alberta New Democratic Party. As of June 21, 2024, she serves as the Official Opposition critic for Mental Health and Addictions.

== Personal life ==
Eremenko is a lifelong Calgarian.

== Electoral history ==
2023 Alberta general election: Calgary-Currie
Party	Candidate	Votes	%	±%
New Democratic	Janet Eremenko	12,261	54.81	+11.94
United Conservative	Nicholas Milliken	9,181	41.04	-2.66
Alberta Party	Jason Avramenko	409	1.83	-9.19
Green	Lane Robson	222	0.99	–
Liberal	Leila Keith	216	0.97	-1.19
Solidarity Movement	Dawid Pawlowski	83	0.37	–
Total		22,372	99.12	–
Rejected and declined		198	0.88	
Turnout		22,570	62.39	
Eligible electors		36,178		
New Democratic gain from United Conservative		Swing		+7.30
Source(s) Source: Elections Alberta

2019 Alberta general election: Calgary-Elbow
Party	Candidate	Votes	%	±%	Expenditures
United Conservative	Doug Schweitzer	10,951	44.34	+5.03	$309,597
Alberta Party	Greg Clark	7,542	30.54	-9.73	$70,288
New Democratic	Janet Eremenko	5,796	23.47	+7.17	$44,092
Liberal	Robin Mackintosh	275	1.11	-2.61	$500
Green	Quinn Rupert	132	0.53	+0.45	$500
Total		24,696	98.36	–	
Rejected, spoiled and declined		413	1.64		
Turnout		25,109	71.88		
Eligible voters		34,934			
United Conservative gain from Alberta Party		Swing		+7.38	
Source(s) Source: Elections Alberta Note: Expenses is the sum of "Election Expenses", "Other Expenses" and "Transfers Issued". The Elections Act limits "Election Expenses" to $50,000.
