= Scud Stud =

Two TV journalists have become known as the Scud Stud:

- Canadian Arthur Kent, when working for NBC in the 1991 Gulf War
- Somali-born Rageh Omaar, when working for the BBC in the 2003 Iraq War
