= Gary Dickson =

Canadian politician

Robert Gary Dickson is a lawyer and former member of the Legislative Assembly of Alberta and the first Saskatchewan Information and Privacy Commissioner.

Dickson was initially elected as a member of the Alberta Liberal Party in a 1992 by-election that had been called after the death of famous MLA Sheldon Chumir, defeating Rod Love, a well-known political consultant. He went on to be re-elected for two more terms in the 1993 and 1997 general elections, and retired from the legislature in 2001.

On November 1, 2003 he was appointed as the first Information and Privacy Commissioner in Saskatchewan.

| Preceded by Sheldon Chumir | MLA Calgary-Buffalo; 1992-2001 | Succeeded by Harvey Cenaiko |
