= Harvey Cenaiko =

Canadian politician

The Honourable Harvey Cenaiko ECA

Member of the Legislative Assembly of Alberta
- In office March 12, 2001 – March 3, 2008
- Preceded by: Gary Dickson
- Succeeded by: Kent Hehr
- Constituency: Calgary-Buffalo

Alberta Solicitor General and Minister of Public Security
- In office November 25, 2004 – December 15, 2006
- Preceded by: Heather Forsyth
- Succeeded by: Fred Lindsay

Personal details
- Born: July 15, 1956 (age 70) Wakaw, Saskatchewan
- Party: Progressive Conservative Association of Alberta
- Education: University of Saskatchewan
- Profession: Police officer

Harvey Cenaiko ECA (born July 15, 1956 in Wakaw, Saskatchewan) is a former Canadian politician who served as Solicitor General and Minister of Public Safety for the province of Alberta. He served as the member of the Legislative Assembly of Alberta (MLA) for Calgary-Buffalo from 2001 to 2008.

== Early life ==
After graduating from high school in Wakaw, Cenaiko attended the University of Saskatchewan in Saskatoon, then moved west to Calgary where he began training with the Calgary Police Service.

Cenaiko worked for 25 years with the Calgary Police Service. At the time of his retirement, he was an inspector with the Bureau of Community Policing Services.

== Member of the Legislative Assembly ==
In addition to his role as MLA, Cenaiko has acted as a member of the Standing Committee on Public Accounts and the Standing Policy Committee on Justice and Government Services. Cenaiko also chaired the Ambulance Advisory and Appeal Board and the Alberta Vehicle Theft Committee. In addition, Cenaiko was a member of the MLA Policing Review Committee and the Government MLA Committee Considering a Review of the Labour Relations Code.

Within his role as Solicitor-General, Cenaiko set up a team of investigators that would investigate criminal activity by police officers which was made up of veteran police officers only with no civilian involvement as Cenaiko felt that civilians lacked the expertise to oversee investigations of criminal activity. This action drew criticism from NDP critic David Eggen who stated that civilians also should form members of the team in order to ensure that they would be independent of the police agencies that are being reviewed. This opinion is echoed by Tom Engels, chair of the policing committee of the Criminal Trial Lawyers’ Association, who states that the current system which allows police to investigate complaints, other than the most serious complaints, against their fellow officers is flawed and lacks credibility. Instead, the system should be replaced by an independent, civilian-led agency to investigate police complaints. The Alberta Serious Incident Response Team, which investigates police in cases of death or serious injuries, lacks the resources to complete timely investigations.

In 2002/2003, he also chaired the Review of Ambulance Service Delivery and the Child Welfare Act Review. The Child Welfare Act Review, which culminated in the Strengthening Children, Families and Youth Report, formed the basis for a new Child Welfare Amendment Act as well as the Family Support for Children With Disabilities Act.

Cenaiko was elected to his second term as member of the Legislative Assembly for the riding of Calgary-Buffalo on November 22, 2004. On November 25, 2004, he was sworn in as Alberta's Solicitor General. He did not seek re-election in the 2008 election.

Harvey is now the Chair of the National Parole Board of Canada.
