= Jon Lord (politician) =

Canadian politician

Member of the Legislative Assembly of Alberta
- In office 2001–2004
- Preceded by: Jocelyn Burgener
- Succeeded by: Dave Taylor
- Constituency: Calgary-Currie

Personal details
- Born: December 29, 1956 Calgary, Alberta
- Died: March 25, 2014 (aged 57) Calgary, Alberta
- Party: Progressive Conservative Association of Alberta
- Spouse(s): Patricia DeCecco - Lord (1993-2008), Partner, Sheryl Guillaume
- Children: Amanda DeCecco - Kolebaba, Michelle DeCecco, Katie DeCecco, Jessica Eren
- Occupation: businessman

Jonathan Joseph Lord (December 29, 1956 – March 25, 2014) was a Canadian politician and member of the Legislative Assembly of Alberta from Alberta, Canada.

== Early life ==
Lord was born Jonathan Joseph Brown in Calgary and raised in on a homestead in rural Central Alberta. Lord started his first business at age 18 (A Appolo Painting - named as such so that it would be listed in the first page of the phone book) and has owned and operated small businesses ever since. As a young adult, Brown, a diehard fan of the band Deep Purple, changed his surname to Lord as a tribute to one of their founders, Jon Lord. Lord attended the University of Alberta studying Business Administration and Commerce (first class standing). He then established Casablanca Video in Calgary, which became the 11-time Readers Choice Award Winner as Calgary's best Video Rental outlet (FFWD magazine). Casablanca was honoured as one of four finalists for Alberta Small Business of the Year, Premier's Award, Alberta Chamber of Commerce in 2007 and in 2012 was still open as one of Canada's oldest surviving video rental outlets. Casablanca is well known in the community for its support of volunteer charities and local community initiatives. In 1985, Lord was the Founding Chairman of one of Alberta's first Business Revitalization Zones (BRZ) which named the district "Marda Loop" in 1985. Lord was Founding Chairman of Alberta's first BRZ Summerfestival which they named Marda Loop "Marda Gras" summer festival, first held in 1985. Lord became the Founding Chairman of the Federation of Business Revitalization Zones (FedBRZ), representing all the provincial BRZs in the Province of Alberta, encompassing about 5000 mostly small businesses.

== Political career ==
Lord ran for Calgary City Council in 1995, and was elected as Alderman for Ward 8 for two consecutive terms. Lord introduced ISO14000 while on Council, now the basis of the City's environmental planning policies.

In the 2001 Alberta election, Lord was the Progressive Conservative candidate for the electoral district of Calgary-Currie and was elected Member of the Legislative Assembly (MLA). Lord served on many MLA committees, including Chair of the School Construction and Operating Costs, which identified potential saving of 25% in new school building costs, Chair of the Secondary Suites Review Committee which established building codes for secondary suites under the Alberta Building Codes for the first time, Chair of Special Places 2000 which finalized the designation as environmentally protected of nearly 7000 km^{2} of provincial land and created over 60 new provincial parks. He also served on the Alberta's Place within Confederation Committee. Lord was one of three MLAs who requested and formed the so-called Dumb Rules committee, aimed at reducing red tape and government inefficiencies.

In the 2004 Alberta election Lord was defeated by Dave Taylor of the Liberals.

In the 2010 Calgary election Lord came in fifth place of 17 candidates who had not dropped out, and was selected as "Best Choice" for Calgary Mayor by the Foundation for Democratic Advancement in a 96-page audit of mayoral candidates. Lord spent $40,000 in this election in which most top finishers spent over $300,000 - one spent $1 million, but also did not win. The election was won by Naheed Nenshi with reported expenditures of $404,000.

Lord ran for the Conservative nomination for the Calgary Centre by-election held in late 2012.

Lord ran in the 2013 Calgary civic election for mayor. He gained 21% of the popular votes and lost to incumbent Naheed Nenshi.

He was Chairman of BBQ on the Bow, Canada's oldest Kansas City Barbeque Society sanctioned barbecue competition.

== Death ==
Lord died of a heart attack at his home in Calgary on March 25, 2014. He was 57.

Political offices
Preceded by Barbara Ann Scott	Calgary Alderman Ward 8; 1995-2001	Succeeded by Madeleine King
Legislative Assembly of Alberta
Preceded by Jocelyn Burgener	MLA Calgary-Currie; 2001-2004	Succeeded by Dave Taylor
