= Calgary-Buffalo =

Provincial electoral district in Alberta, Canada

Coordinates: 51.05°N 114.07°W

Alberta electoral district
- Calgary-Buffalo within the City of Calgary, 2017 boundaries

Provincial electoral district
- Legislature: Legislative Assembly of Alberta
MLA
Joe Ceci
New Democratic
- District created: 1971
- First contested: 1971
- Last contested: 2023

Calgary-Buffalo is a current provincial electoral district in Calgary, Alberta, Canada. The district is one of 87 districts mandated to return a single member (MLA) to the Legislative Assembly of Alberta using the first past the post method of voting. Calgary-Buffalo is currently represented by NDP MLA Joe Ceci.

The riding comprises primarily the downtown core of the city of Calgary. The riding has broad demographic diversity, and comprises the most transient population in Alberta.

The riding contains a mix of corporate office towers, luxury apartment buildings, Chinatown in the north part of the riding and lower income apartments in the south along the Beltline community. The Liberals have won this riding seven times, the Progressive Conservatives six, and the New Democrats twice, while the Alberta Reform Movement was represented very briefly.

Due to the nature of the riding, candidates have a tougher time running a campaign, as traditional campaign methods i.e., placement of lawn signs, door knocking, and voter identification, have proven to be of limited usefulness.

The riding was created in 1971, largely out of the old Calgary Centre riding and a small portion of the eastern part of Calgary West.

== History ==
The electoral district was created in the 1971 boundary re-distribution out of parts of Calgary Centre, Calgary Victoria Park, and Calgary-West. The district has shifted boundaries many times over the years but has always covered the downtown core of Calgary.

The 2010 Alberta electoral boundary re-distribution saw significant changes to the district, losing a huge portion of land to Calgary-Currie on the west boundary when it was cut from 37 Street to 14 Street SW. The East Village neighbourhood and Fort Calgary were moved into Calgary-Fort on the west side and the south boundary was pushed from 17 Avenue into Lower Mount Royal to run along approximately 19 Avenue in land that used to be in Calgary-Currie. The electoral district would have a population of 40,381 in 2010, which was 1.2% below the provincial average of 40,880.

The 2017 Alberta electoral boundary re-distribution saw Calgary-Buffalo expand East into the communities of Ramsay and Inglewood. The boundaries as adjusted would give the electoral district a population of 49,907 in 2017, 7% above the provincial average of 46,803.

=== Boundary history ===
3 Calgary-Buffalo 2003 boundaries
Bordering districts
North	East	West	South
Calgary-Mountain View	Calgary-Egmont and Calgary-Fort	Calgary-Bow	Calgary-Currie and Calgary-Elbow
riding map goes here			
Legal description from the Statutes of Alberta 2003, Electoral Divisions Act.
Starting at the intersection of the northerly extension of 37 Street SW with the right bank of the Bow River; then 1. southeast along the right bank of the Bow River to the left bank of the Elbow River; 2. south and west along the left bank of the Elbow River to 1 Street SE; 3. north along 1 Street SE to 17 Avenue SE; 4. west along 17 Avenue SE and 17 Avenue SW to 45 Street SW; 5. north along 45 Street SW to 8 Avenue SW; 6. east along 8 Avenue SW to 37 Street SW; 7. north along 37 Street SW and its northerly extension to the starting point.
Note:

5 Calgary-Buffalo 2010 boundaries
Bordering districts
North	East	West	South
Calgary-Mountain View	Calgary-Fort	Calgary-Currie	Calgary-Acadia and Calgary-Elbow
Note: Boundary descriptions were not used in the 2010 redistribution

=== Representation history ===
Edmonton-Buffalo
Assembly	Years	Member	Party
Riding created from Calgary Centre, Calgary Victoria Park and Calgary West
17th	1971–1975	Ron Ghitter	Progressive Conservative
18th	1975–1979	Ron Ghitter	Progressive Conservative
19th	1979–1980	Tom Sindlinger	Progressive Conservative
19th	1980–1982	Tom Sindlinger	Independent Conservative
19th	1982–1982	Tom Sindlinger	Alberta Reform Movement
20th	1982–1985	Brian Lee	Progressive Conservative
21st	1986–1989	Sheldon Chumir	Liberal
22nd	1989–1992	Sheldon Chumir	Liberal
22nd	1992–1993	Gary Dickson	Liberal
23rd	1993–1997	Gary Dickson	Liberal
24th	1997–2001	Gary Dickson	Liberal
25th	2001–2004	Harvey Cenaiko	Progressive Conservative
26th	2004–2008	Harvey Cenaiko	Progressive Conservative
27th	2008–2012	Kent Hehr	Liberal
28th	2012–2015	Kent Hehr	Liberal
29th	2015–2019	Kathleen Ganley	New Democratic
30th	2019–2023	Joe Ceci	New Democratic
31st	2023–Present	Joe Ceci	New Democratic

The electoral district of Calgary-Buffalo was created in the boundary redistribution of 1971. The area it covered primarily consisted of three antecedent riding's Calgary Centre, Calgary Victoria Park and Calgary West. The riding primarily covers the City of Calgary's downtown core and belt line as well as some southwest inner city neighbourhoods. The riding is one of Calgary's few swing ridings.

The Progressive Conservatives won the first election easily under Ron Ghitter who was later appointed to the Senate of Canada. The second member of the riding Tom Sindlinger who was elected in the 1979 general election. He was removed from the Progressive Conservative caucus on October 16, 1980, and sat as an Independent Conservative after calling for increased transparency with the Heritage Trust Fund.

Sindlinger formed the Alberta Reform Movement, a right wing party and became its leader on September 17, 1982. He was the first and only member of that party to form the Alberta Reform Movement caucus in the legislature. He was defeated in the 1982 general election in a landslide by Progressive Conservative Brian Lee.

Lee only held one term before being defeated by Liberal Sheldon Chumir in 1986. Chumir was re-elected with a landslide in 1989. He died on January 26, 1992. Liberal Gary Dickson won a by-election later that year and held the district for three terms before retiring.

The Progressive Conservatives won the seat back in 2001 with Harvey Cenaiko who was later given the cabinet portfolio of Solicitor General. He retired in 2008. Liberal candidate Kent Hehr won back the electoral district for his party in 2008. April 23, 2012, Kent Hehr was re-elected for a second term during the biggest percentage turnout of eligible voters since 1993. 2015 election, Kent Hehr decided to step up to the Federal Election which will be fall of 2015.

NDP candidate Kathleen Ganley won Calgary Buffalo for her party in the provincial election of 2015 for the first time. Joe Ceci was elected under the NDP banner in 2019 and is the current MLA.

== Legislative election results ==
=== Graphical summary ===
1971
11.09%	42.56%	46.35%
NDP	Social Credit	Progressive Conservative

1975
9.53%	8.54%	70.88%	10.45%
NDP	Social Credit	Progressive Conservative	Liberal

1979
10.39%	14.15%	64.02%	10.83%
NDP	Social Credit	Progressive Conservative	Liberal

1982
9.93%	62.27%	21.73%	6.07%
NDP	Progressive Conservative	Alberta Reform Movement	Western Canada

1986
10.98%	34.64%	52.84%
NDP	Progressive Conservative	Liberal

1989
7.64%	31.33%	61.03%
NDP	Progressive Conservative	Liberal

1992
25.4%	15.25%	53.89%
NDP	Progressive Conservative	Liberal

1993
10%	40.7%	45.54%
NDP	Progressive Conservative	Liberal

1997
5.83%	3%	43.84%	45.91%
NDP		Progressive Conservative	Liberal

2001
4.59%	54.18%	40.13%
NDP	Progressive Conservative	Liberal

2004
4.9%	43.53%	4%	36.42%	8.67%
NDP	Progressive Conservative	Alliance	Liberal	Green

2008
4.1%	38.85%	48.83%	6.5%
NDP	Progressive Conservative	Liberal	Green

2012
5%	30.61%	20.31%	42.02%
NDP	Progressive Conservative	Wildrose	Liberal

2015
35.11%	28.09%	10.15%	24.67%
NDP	Progressive Conservative	Wildrose	Liberal

2019
48.86%	39.16%	2.5%	6.9%
NDP	United Conservative		Alberta

2023
63.00%	34.75%
NDP	United Conservative

=== 1971 ===
1971 Alberta general election
Party	Candidate	Votes	%	±%
Progressive Conservative	Ronald H. Ghitter	5,705	46.36%	–
Social Credit	Don Luzzi	5,238	42.56%	–
New Democratic	Jane Ann Summers	1,364	11.08%	–
Total		12,307	–	–
Rejected, spoiled and declined		72	–	–
Eligible electors / turnout		18,664	66.33%	–
Progressive Conservative pickup new district.				
Source(s) Source: "Calgary-Buffalo Official Results 1971 Alberta general election". Alberta Heritage Community Foundation.

=== 1975 ===
1975 Alberta general election
Party	Candidate	Votes	%	±%
Progressive Conservative	Ronald H. Ghitter	6,525	70.89%	24.53%
Liberal	Maria Eriksen	962	10.45%	–
New Democratic	Paula Davies	877	9.53%	-1.56%
Social Credit	Norman Ashmead	786	8.54%	-34.02%
Communist	David Wallis	55	0.60%	–
Total		9,205	–	–
Rejected, spoiled and declined		26	–	–
Eligible electors / turnout		18,219	50.67%	-15.66%
Progressive Conservative hold		Swing		28.32%
Source(s) Source: "Calgary-Buffalo Official Results 1975 Alberta general election". Alberta Heritage Community Foundation.

=== 1979 ===
1979 Alberta general election
Party	Candidate	Votes	%	±%
Progressive Conservative	Tom Sindlinger	6,481	64.02%	-6.86%
Social Credit	Jim Rocker	1,432	14.15%	5.61%
Liberal	Lloyd Hamilton	1,096	10.83%	0.38%
New Democratic	Brian Rees	1,052	10.39%	0.86%
Communist	David Willis	62	0.61%	0.01%
Total		10,123	–	–
Rejected, spoiled and declined		39	–	–
Eligible electors / turnout		24,091	42.18%	-8.49%
Progressive Conservative hold		Swing		-5.28%
Source(s) Source: "Calgary-Buffalo Official Results 1979 Alberta general election". Alberta Heritage Community Foundation.

=== 1982 ===
1982 Alberta general election
Party	Candidate	Votes	%	±%
Progressive Conservative	Brian Craig Lee	7,591	62.27%	-1.75%
Alberta Reform Movement	Tom Sindlinger	2,649	21.73%	–
New Democratic	Barry Pashak	1,211	9.93%	-0.46%
Western Canada Concept	Anita Bozak	739	6.06%	–
Total		12,190	–	–
Rejected, spoiled and declined		52	–	–
Eligible electors / turnout		24,764	49.43%	7.25%
Progressive Conservative hold		Swing		-4.67%
Source(s) Source: "Calgary-Buffalo Official Results 1982 Alberta general election". Alberta Heritage Community Foundation.

=== 1986 ===
1986 Alberta general election
Party	Candidate	Votes	%	±%
Liberal	Sheldon Chumir	5,242	52.84%	–
Progressive Conservative	Brian Craig Lee	3,437	34.64%	-27.63%
New Democratic	George Chatsis	1,089	10.98%	1.04%
Representative	Colin Svendsen	153	1.54%	–
Total		9,921	–	–
Rejected, spoiled and declined		30	–	–
Eligible electors / turnout		26,048	38.20%	-11.23%
Liberal gain from Progressive Conservative		Swing		-11.17%
Source(s) Source: "Calgary-Buffalo Official Results 1986 Alberta general election". Alberta Heritage Community Foundation.

=== 1989 ===
1989 Alberta general election
Party	Candidate	Votes	%	±%
Liberal	Sheldon Chumir	7,014	61.03%	8.20%
Progressive Conservative	Kate Thrasher	3,601	31.33%	-3.31%
New Democratic	Iain Dunbar	877	7.63%	-3.35%
Total		11,492	–	–
Rejected, spoiled and declined		33	–	–
Eligible electors / turnout		26,433	43.60%	5.40%
Liberal hold		Swing		5.75%
Source(s) Source: "Calgary-Buffalo Official Results 1989 Alberta general election". Alberta Heritage Community Foundation.

=== 1992 by-election ===
Alberta provincial by-election, July 21, 1992 Called upon the death of death of Liberal MLA Sheldon Chumir on January 26, 1992.
Party	Candidate	Votes	%	±%
Liberal	Gary Dickson	4,636	53.89%	-7.14%
New Democratic	Elaine Husband	2,185	25.40%	17.76%
Progressive Conservative	Rod Love	1,312	15.25%	-16.08%
Confederation of Regions	Joseph Babineau	268	3.12%	–
Greens	Sol Candel	201	2.34%	–
Total		8,602	–	–
Rejected, Spoiled and Declined		47	–	–
Eligible electors / Turnout		26,029	%	%
Liberal hold		Swing		%
Source(s) Source:

=== 1993 ===
1993 Alberta general election
Party	Candidate	Votes	%	±%
Liberal	Gary Dickson	4,826	45.54%	-15.50%
Progressive Conservative	Steven Yu	4,313	40.70%	9.36%
New Democratic	Israel Lachovsky	1,062	10.02%	2.39%
Greens	Rebecca Matiowsky	212	2.00%	–
Natural Law	Ralph Holt	185	1.75%	–
Total		10,598	–	–
Rejected, spoiled and declined		74	–	–
Eligible electors / turnout		23,439	45.53%	1.93%
Liberal hold		Swing		-12.43%
Source(s) Source: "Calgary-Buffalo Official Results 1993 Alberta general election". Alberta Heritage Community Foundation.

=== 1997 ===
1997 Alberta general election
Party	Candidate	Votes	%	±%
Liberal	Gary Dickson	4,310	45.91%	0.38%
Progressive Conservative	Terri-Lynn Bradford	4,115	43.84%	3.14%
New Democratic	Neil McKinnon	547	5.83%	-4.19%
Social Credit	Raymond Neilson	300	3.20%	–
Natural Law	Ralph Holt	115	1.23%	-0.52%
Total		9,387	–	–
Rejected, spoiled and declined		68	–	–
Eligible electors / turnout		22,929	41.24%	-4.29%
Liberal hold		Swing		-1.38%
Source(s) Source: "Calgary-Buffalo Official Results 1997 Alberta general election". Alberta Heritage Community Foundation.

=== 2001 ===
2001 Alberta general election
Party	Candidate	Votes	%	±%
Progressive Conservative	Harvey Cenaiko	5,582	54.18%	10.34%
Liberal	Brian Edy	4,135	40.13%	-5.78%
New Democratic	Neil McKinnon	473	4.59%	-1.24%
Social Credit	Dave Schwartz	113	1.10%	-2.10%
Total		10,303	–	–
Rejected, spoiled and declined		49	–	–
Eligible electors / turnout		24,844	41.67%	0.43%
Progressive Conservative gain from Liberal		Swing		5.98%
Source(s) Source: "Calgary-Buffalo Official Results 2001 Alberta general election" (PDF). Elections Alberta.

=== 2004 ===
2004 Alberta general election
Party	Candidate	Votes	%	±%
Progressive Conservative	Harvey Cenaiko	3,365	43.53%	-10.65%
Liberal	Terry Taylor	2,815	36.42%	-3.72%
Green	Grant Neufeld	670	8.67%	–
New Democratic	Cliff Hesby	457	5.91%	1.32%
Alberta Alliance	Nadine Hunka	294	3.80%	–
Social Credit	Elizabeth K. Fielding	73	0.94%	-0.15%
Alberta Party	Carl Schwartz	56	0.72%	–
Total		7,730	–	–
Rejected, spoiled and declined		100	–	–
Eligible electors / turnout		24,689	31.71%	-9.95%
Progressive Conservative hold		Swing		-3.46%
Source(s) Source: "Calgary-Buffalo Statement of Official Results 2004 Alberta general election" (PDF). Elections Alberta.

=== 2008 ===
2008 Alberta general election
Party	Candidate	Votes	%	±%
Liberal	Kent Hehr	4,583	48.83%	12.42%
Progressive Conservative	Sean Chu	3,646	38.85%	-4.68%
Green	Stephen Ricketts	611	6.51%	-2.16%
New Democratic	Robert Lawrence	387	4.12%	-1.79%
Social Credit	Antoni (Tony) Grochowski	158	1.68%	0.74%
Total		9,385	–	–
Rejected, spoiled and declined		103	–	–
Eligible electors / turnout		31,223	30.39%	-1.33%
Liberal gain from Progressive Conservative		Swing		1.43%
Source(s) Source: "03 - Calgary-Buffalo, 2008 Alberta general election". officialresults.elections.ab.ca. Elections Alberta. The Report on the March 3, 2008 Provincial General Election of the Twenty-seventh Legislative Assembly. Elections Alberta. July 28, 2008. pp. 178–180.

=== 2012 ===
2012 Alberta general election
Party	Candidate	Votes	%	±%
Liberal	Kent Hehr	4,740	41.47%	-7.36%
Progressive Conservative	Jamie Lall	3,506	30.67%	-8.18%
Wildrose	Mike Blanchard	2,415	21.13%	–
New Democratic	Rebecca Eras	539	4.72%	0.59%
Alberta Party	Cory Mack	230	2.01%	–
Total		11,430	–	–
Rejected, spoiled and declined		176	–	–
Eligible electors / turnout		26,220	44.26%	13.88%
Liberal hold		Swing		0.41%
Source(s) Source: "05 - Calgary-Buffalo, 2012 Alberta general election". officialresults.elections.ab.ca. Elections Alberta.

=== 2015 ===
2015 Alberta general election
Party	Candidate	Votes	%	±%	Expenditures
New Democratic	Kathleen T. Ganley	4,671	35.11%	30.39%	$3,118
Progressive Conservative	Terry Rock	3,738	28.09%	-2.58%	$92,068
Liberal	David Khan	3,282	24.67%	-16.80%	$54,749
Wildrose	Leah Wamboldt	1,351	10.15%	-10.97%	$2,900
Green	Sabrina Lee Levac	263	1.98%	–	$500
Total		13,305	–	–	–
Rejected, spoiled and declined		162	–	–	–
Eligible electors / turnout		32,950	40.87%	-3.39%	–
New Democratic gain from Liberal		Swing		-1.89%	
Source(s) Source: "05 - Calgary-Buffalo, 2015 Alberta general election". officialresults.elections.ab.ca. Elections Alberta. "2015-2016 Annual Report of the Chief Electoral Officer" (PDF). Elections Alberta.

=== 2019 ===
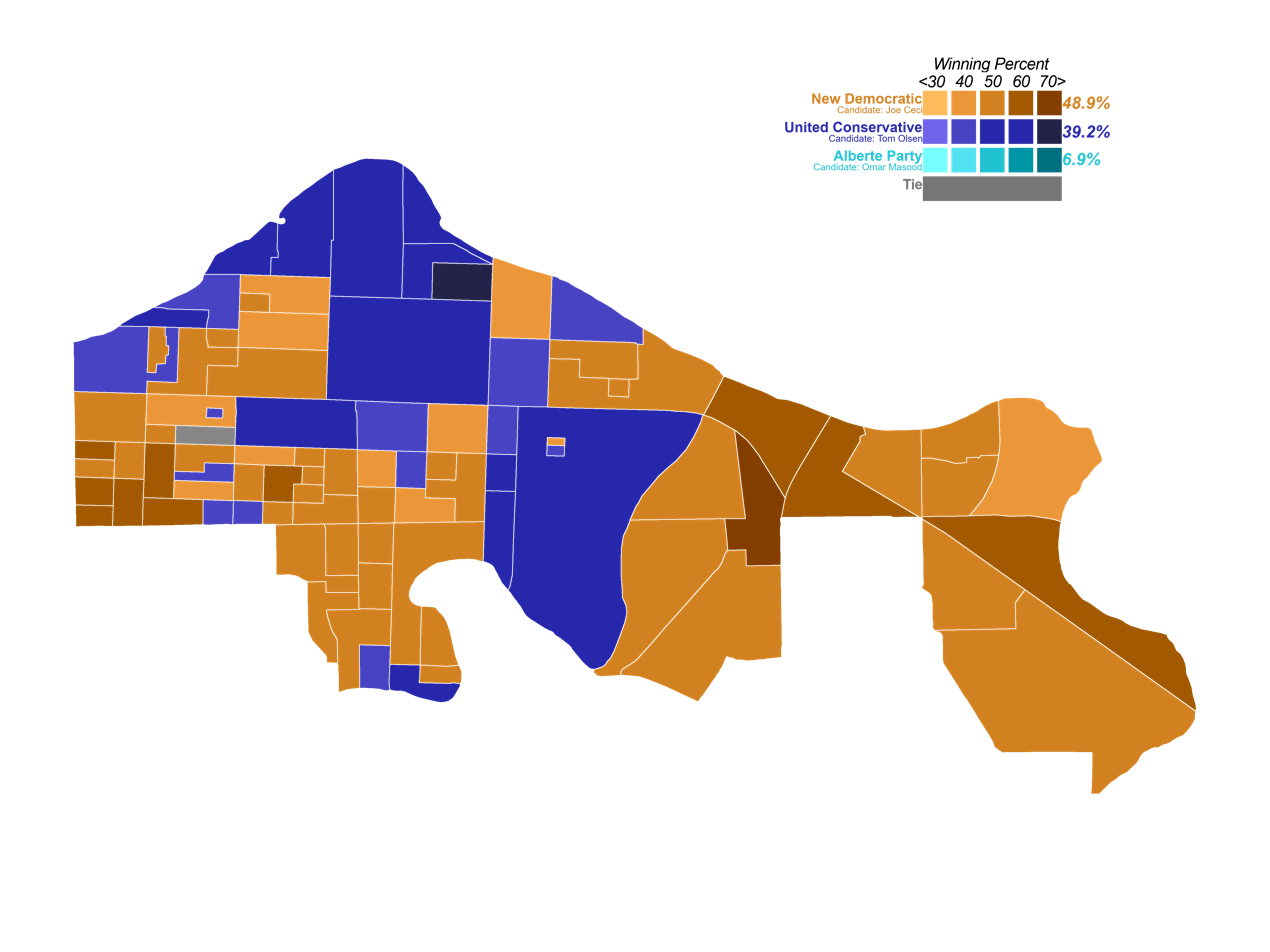
Results by Polling Division

2019 Alberta general election
Party	Candidate	Votes	%	±%	Expenditures
New Democratic	Joe Ceci	11,292	48.86%	13.75%	$56,232
United Conservative	Tom Olsen	9,050	39.16%	0.92%	$60,374
Alberta Party	Omar Masood	1,597	6.91%	+4.01%	$24,282
Liberal	Jennifer Khan	590	2.55%	-22.11%	$500
Green	Heather Morigeau	436	1.89%	-0.09%	$534
Alberta Independence	Cory Hetherington	147	0.64%	–	$1,005
Total		23,112	–	–	
Rejected, spoiled and declined		290	–	–	
Eligible electors / turnout		38,432	60.89%	20.02%	
New Democratic hold		Swing		1.34%	
Source(s) Source: Elections Alberta Note: Expenses is the sum of "Election Expenses", "Other Expenses" and "Transfers Issued". The Elections Act limits "Election Expenses" to $50,000.

=== 2023 ===
2023 Alberta general election
Party	Candidate	Votes	%	±%
New Democratic	Joe Ceci	13,221	63.00	+14.14
United Conservative	Astrid Kuhn	7,292	34.75	-4.41
Green	Jonathan Parks	349	1.66	-0.22
Solidarity Movement	Lona Henry	125	0.60	–
Total		20,987	98.82	–
Rejected and declined		250	1.18	
Turnout		21,237	56.18	
Eligible voters		37,801		
New Democratic hold		Swing		+9.28
Source(s) Source: Elections Alberta

== Senate nominee election results ==
=== 2004 ===
2004 Senate nominee election results: Calgary-Buffalo				Turnout 31.76%	
Affiliation	Candidate	Votes	% votes	% ballots	Rank
Progressive Conservative	Bert Brown	2,743	15.18%	45.37%	1
Progressive Conservative	Jim Silye	2,393	13.24%	39.59%	5
Progressive Conservative	Betty Unger	2,177	12.05%	36.01%	2
Independent	Link Byfield	2,134	11.81%	35.30%	4
Progressive Conservative	Cliff Breitkreuz	2,104	11.64%	34.81%	3
Independent	Tom Sindlinger	1,774	9.82%	29.35%	9
Progressive Conservative	David Usherwood	1,539	8.52%	25.46%	6
Alberta Alliance	Vance Gough	1,159	6.41%	19.17%	8
Alberta Alliance	Michael Roth	1,055	5.84%	17.45%	7
Alberta Alliance	Gary Horan	994	5.49%	16.44%	10
Total votes		18,072	100%		
Total ballots		6,045	2.99 votes per ballot		
Rejected, spoiled and declined		1,796			
24,689 eligible electors

Voters had the option of selecting four candidates on the ballot

== Plebiscite results ==
=== 1971 daylight saving plebiscite ===
Do you favour province-wide Daylight Saving Time?
For	Against
9,363 76.80%	2,828 23.20%
Province wide result: Passed

== Student vote results ==
=== 2004 ===
Participating schools
Almadina ESL Charter School
National Sport School
Sacred Heart School

On November 19, 2004, a student vote was conducted at participating Alberta schools to parallel the 2004 Alberta general election results. The vote was designed to educate students and simulate the electoral process for persons who have not yet reached the legal majority. The vote was conducted in 80 of the 83 provincial electoral districts with students voting for actual election candidates. Schools with a large student body that reside in another electoral district had the option to vote for candidates outside of the electoral district then where they were physically located.

2004 Alberta student vote results
Affiliation	Candidate	Votes	%
Liberal	Terry Taylor	62	34.44%
Green	Grant Neufeld	32	17.78%
Progressive Conservative	Harvey Cenaiko	22	12.22%
New Democrat	Cliff Hesby	18	10.00%
Alberta Alliance	Nadine Hunka	16	8.89%
Alberta Party	Carl Schwartz	16	8.89%
Social Credit	Elizabeth Fielding	14	7.78%
Total		180	100%
Rejected, spoiled and declined		7	

== See also ==
- List of Alberta provincial electoral districts
- Canadian provincial electoral districts
