= Fred Peacock =

Canadian politician

MLA for Calgary Currie
- In office 1971–1979
- Preceded by: none
- Succeeded by: Dennis Anderson

Personal details
- Born: November 23, 1916 Calgary, Alberta
- Died: February 15, 2010 (aged 93) Calgary, Alberta
- Party: Progressive Conservative Association of Alberta

Frederick Halliday Peacock (November 23, 1916 – February 15, 2010) was a businessman and former provincial level politician from Alberta, Canada. He served as a member of the Legislative Assembly of Alberta from 1971 until 1979.

== Political career ==
Peacock was elected to the Alberta Legislature in the 1971 Alberta general election. He defeated long time Social Credit incumbent Frederick Colborne, to win the new electoral district of Calgary Currie for the Progressive Conservatives. Peacock was re-elected with a landslide majority in the 1975 Alberta general election defeating three other candidates.

During his time in office he served as Minister of Development and Trade.

== Later life ==
Peacock was a member of the Rotary Club of Calgary South. He was also a member of the board of directors for the University of Calgary's The Van Horne Institute. He was also President of Peacock Holdings Limited

Legislative Assembly of Alberta
| Preceded by New District | MLA Calgary Currie; 1971–1979 | Succeeded by Dennis Anderson |
