= Jocelyn Burgener =

Canadian politician

Member of the Legislative Assembly of Alberta
- In office 1993–2001
- Preceded by: Dennis Anderson
- Succeeded by: Jon Lord
- Constituency: Calgary-Currie

Personal details
- Born: Mary Jocelyn Rivers; March 4, 1949 (age 77) Coventry, England, UK
- Party: Progressive Conservative Association of Alberta
- Education: Ryerson Polytechnical Institute (now Toronto Metropolitan University)
- Occupation: businesswoman

Mary Jocelyn Burgener (née Rivers; March 4, 1949) is a businesswoman and politician. She is also a former municipal and provincial level politician from Alberta, Canada. She served as a Member of the Legislative Assembly of Alberta from 1993 until 2001.

== Political career ==
Burgener was elected to the Alberta Legislature in the 1993 Alberta general election. She ran as the Progressive Conservative candidate in the electoral district of Calgary Currie. She won the race with a comfortable margin of about 2000 votes over Liberal candidate Mairi Matheson. The race also included Alberta Political Alliance leader Mark Waters who made a strong fourth place showing. She stood for office for a second term in the 1997 Alberta general election winning a reduced plurality but still finishing with a wide margin over the field of four other candidates.

== Author ==
In May 2014, Burgener published her first book Naked Under My Coat: Writing Under the Influence of Parkinson's, a collection of poems and short stories written during the onset and formal diagnosis of Parknson's.

Legislative Assembly of Alberta
Preceded by Dennis Anderson	MLA Calgary Currie; 1993–2001	Succeeded by Jon Lord
