= Alberta Reform Movement =

- Abbreviation: ARM
- Leader: Tom Sindlinger
- Founder: Tom Sindlinger
- Founded: 1981
- Dissolved: 1982
- Ideology: Democratic Reform
- Political position: centre-right

The Alberta Reform Movement was a provincial political party in Alberta, Canada founded in 1981 by Tom Sindlinger. Sindlinger had been a Progressive Conservative Party member of the legislative assembly for Calgary-Buffalo. He left the Progressive Conservatives after disagreeing with the party on the issue of transparency with the Heritage Trust Fund. The provincial government kept the names of the persons managing the trust funds, as they claimed it would compromise the investment strategy of the fund.

The Alberta Reform Movement advocated reforming and modernizing the democratic process in Alberta and increasing the transparency of government.

In the words of Tom Sindlinger: "The Alberta Reform Movement was a moderate and practical alternative to ideological advocates and the old way of doing things."

In the 1982 Alberta election, the party nominated 14 candidates, winning 6,258 votes and 0.66% of the popular vote. The best showing was by Tom Sindlinger himself, who came second in Calgary-Buffalo, losing his seat.

== Election results ==
Election	Leader	Candidates	Seats	Seat Change	Votes	%	Place
1982	Tom Sindlinger	14 / 79	0 / 79	▼1	6,258	0.66	6th
