= Brian Lee (public speaker) =

Canadian executive and former politician

Brian Craig Lee (born August 2, 1950) is a Canadian entrepreneur and a former politician. He is currently the chief executive officer of Custom Learning Systems, a consulting firm specialising in positive healthcare workplace culture that he founded in 1984.

== Political career ==
After his early experience in business as Vice President & General Manager of a chain of retail furniture stores, Lee turned to local politics. Elected to Calgary City Council in 1977, Lee was the youngest Alderman ever elected in Calgary at the time. For his two terms in office, he served on forty civic boards, commissions and committees including the Calgary Police Commission, the Legislation Committee, the Metropolitan Calgary Foundation and the Disaster Services Committee.

Lee served two terms as Calgary's Alderman, from 1977 to 1980 and 1980 to 1982, before stepping up to provincial politics and being elected as a Member of the Alberta Legislature, for the constituency of Calgary-Buffalo. Again active on numerous governmental committees, Lee's focus while in Provincial politics included civic affairs, urban transportation, senior citizens' affairs, human rights and multicultural affairs. He was defeated in the 1986 Alberta general election and retired from active politics.

== Business career ==
Lee continues to operate Custom Learning Systems, the business he founded in 1984. He has written several books.

== Community service ==
Brian Lee has long-time affiliations with Junior Achievement, Toastmasters and the Canadian Association of Public Speakers.

== Books ==
- Lee, Brian (1998). Satisfaction Guaranteed: How to Satisfy Every Customer Every Time!. Calgary: Mastery Publishing Co. pp. 128 pages. ISBN 0921328028.
- Lee, Brian (1998). The Wedding M. C.. Calgary: Custom Learning Systems Group. pp. 464 pages. ISBN 0921328052.
- Lee, Brian (2002). Keep Your Nursing and Healthcare Professionals For Life. Calgary: Mastery Publishing. pp. 222 pages. ISBN 0921328079.

Preceded by Tom Sindlinger	MLA Calgary-Buffalo; 1982-1986	Succeeded by Sheldon Chumir
