= Dennis Anderson (politician) =

Canadian politician (1949–2019)

MLA for Calgary-Currie
- In office 1979–1993
- Preceded by: Fred Peacock
- Succeeded by: Jocelyn Burgener

Personal details
- Born: August 16, 1949 Edmonton, Alberta
- Died: March 20, 2019 (aged 69) Edmonton, Alberta
- Party: Progressive Conservative Association of Alberta

Dennis Lester Anderson (August 16, 1949 – March 20, 2019) was a provincial-level politician from Alberta, Canada. At seventeen, Anderson attended Rochdale College in Toronto and started the Rochdale Drug Crisis Centre. He has continued to advocate for mental health ever since. After Rochdale, he spent several years in media, hosting weekly radio shows about current political affairs.

== Political career ==
Born in Edmonton, Anderson ran as a Progressive Conservative candidate in the 1979 Alberta general election. He won the electoral district of Calgary-Currie, defeating three other candidates. He was re-elected to his second term in the 1982 Alberta general election, winning the popular vote. Anderson stood for a third term in the 1986 Alberta general election. He won that election defeating three other candidates, but his vote share decreased.

After the election, Premier Don Getty appointed Anderson as the Minister of Culture and Multiculturalism and Women's Issues. Anderson held this position until 1987, when he became Minister of Municipal Affairs and Housing. He ran for his fourth and final term in the 1989 Alberta general election. He won election defeating two other candidates. After the election, Anderson was appointed as Minister of Consumer and Corporate Affairs, holding that post until Ralph Klein became Premier in 1992. Anderson also served as deputy house leader and was the primary lead for the Alberta legislative committees on Canada's constitution and Senate reform. Anderson retired at the dissolution of the Alberta Legislature in 1993.

== Late life ==
After leaving politics, Anderson worked in Russia aiding cities in developing democratic systems, in Peru establishing fairness and protection of individual rights, twice in Ukraine observing elections, and in India advising on mental health. Since 2000, he has served as Honorary Consul, and now Consul General for Thailand, responsible for Alberta, Saskatchewan, and Manitoba. A Commander of the White Elephant (Thailand), he has also received the companion Medal (Thailand).

Anderson has served as president of the Canadian Mental Health Association in Alberta and on its national executive. He was a director of the Mental Health Commission of Canada, and has worked with other mental health advocacy organizations including the Assured Income for the Severely Handicapped (AISH) panel supporting the provision of financial and health benefits to eligible Albertans with a disability. As Commissioner of the Edmonton Police Commission from 2006 to 2012 and chair of all Alberta Police Commissions, he initiated mental health training for police.

As founding chair of the Alberta Alliance for Mental Illness and Mental Health, Anderson united sixteen organizations in the governance of mental health. He has been an advisor to organizations including the psychiatric department of the University of Alberta, he was founding chair of the Lieutenant Governor's Circle on Mental Health and Addictions, and created the Chimo Project providing animal-assisted therapy for people with mental illness.

He died on March 20, 2019, of complications from sleep apnea.

== Awards and honours ==
Anderson received the Hero's award for pioneering the Chimo Project as well as a Best West Award for the best radio show, Youth in Trouble. A recipient of the C.M. Hincks Award from the Canadian Mental Health Association, he has also been awarded the Alberta Centennial Medal, Queen's Diamond Jubilee Medal, 125th Anniversary Commemorative Medal, and Canada's Sovereign's Medal for Volunteers.

== Latest Achievements ==
Anderson worked with governments, hospitals, and other agencies in creating a program that uses animals to foster better mental health. He joined the board of the Royal Institute for Mental Health Research in Ottawa.

Anderson received an Honorary Doctorate of Law from the University of Alberta in 2017. When he accepted his degree, Anderson said this: "When I left home, I also had to find a reason for life. It may seem foolish, but I decided that to change this world for the better was to be my reason for living. For me, and I believe for you, we must truly feel worthwhile in this very fast moving and complex world; I suggest we must be working to improve our world, not just working, at our occupation."

Legislative Assembly of Alberta
Preceded by Fred Peacock	MLA Calgary Currie; 1979-1993	Succeeded by Jocelyn Burgener
