= Nicholas Milliken =

Canadian politician

The Honourable Nicholas Milliken ECA
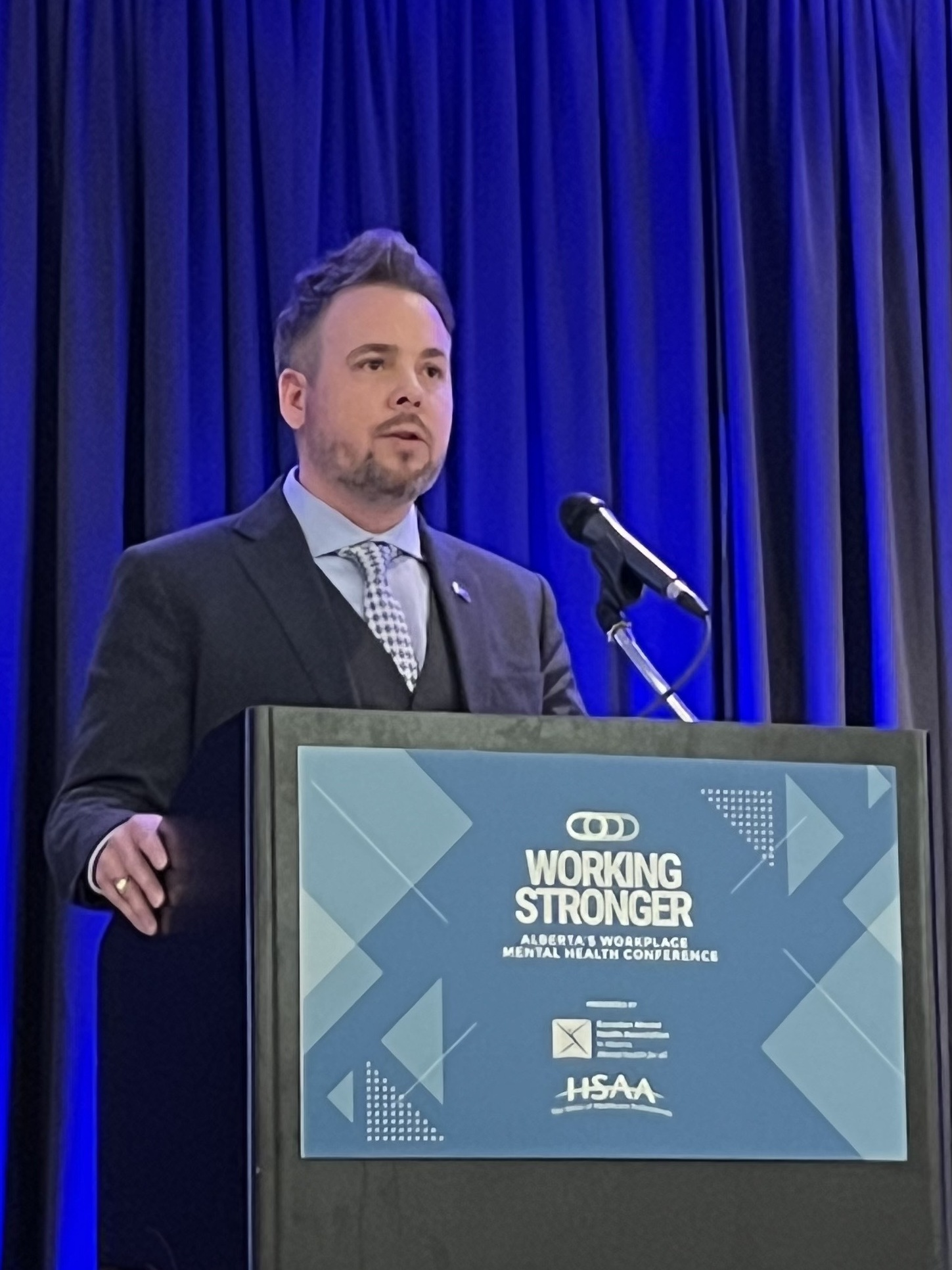
- Milliken in 2023

Member of the Legislative Assembly of Alberta for Calgary-Currie
- In office April 16, 2019 – May 29, 2023
- Preceded by: Brian Malkinson
- Succeeded by: Janet Eremenko

Alberta Minister of Mental Health and Addiction
- In office October 24, 2022 – June 9, 2023
- Premier: Danielle Smith
- Preceded by: Mike Ellis; As Associate Minister
- Succeeded by: Dan Williams

Alberta Minister of Infrastructure
- In office June 21, 2022 – October 21, 2022
- Premier: Jason Kenney
- Preceded by: Prasad Panda
- Succeeded by: Nathan Neudorf

Personal details
- Party: United Conservative Party
- Education: University of Alberta
- Occupation: Lawyer
- Website: https://nicholasmilliken.nationbuilder.com/

Nicholas Milliken ECA is a Canadian politician who was elected in the 2019 Alberta general election to represent the electoral district of Calgary-Currie in the 30th Alberta Legislature. Milliken defeated incumbent Brian Malkinson by a margin of less than 1% (191 votes). He was appointed as Minister of Mental Health and Addiction and sworn in on October 24, 2022.

Milliken was elected Deputy Chair of Committees in the Alberta Legislature on May 21, 2019.

On June 21, 2022, Premier Jason Kenney appointed Milliken as Alberta's Minister of Infrastructure. He was later appointed to Premier Danielle Smith's first cabinet as Minister of Mental Health and Addiction, the first to lead a full Ministry of Mental Health and Addiction. Prior to Milliken's appointment, this position was held by Associate Ministers.

Milliken was defeated by Janet Eremenko of the Alberta NDP in the 2023 Alberta general election.

== Background ==
Milliken studied at the Shawnigan Lake School. After finishing high school, he went to the University of Alberta to pursue a B.A. in Economics and Philosophy, and a B.Com., Strategic and Organization with distinction. He then received a law degree from the University of Saskatchewan. While he was studying for his first degree, he worked as an assistant account manager at GE Capital. After graduating from law school, he started his career as a lawyer at Dinning Hunter Lambert & Jackson, a law firm in Victoria, BC, where he worked for a year and five months. He then moved to another full-service law firm, Davis LLP (DLA Piper), to continue his profession. After working for a year at that firm, he became a legal recruitment consultant at a legal recruitment company in Calgary. A year later, he worked for Brydges Line Duty Counsel as a legal counsel for 5 years and 4 months. After that, he decided to quit that job and start his own legal recruitment company, Brolly Legal Recruitment in Calgary. He expended the company to Toronto while serving as the founder and CEO from April 2013 to April 2019.

== Contribution in government ==
The Minister of Mental Health and Addictions, Milliken, and the Government of Alberta have pledged $1.8 million towards pre-treatment programs aimed at providing addiction support in Calgary. The funding will go towards a pre-treatment program designed to bridge the gap between detox and treatment and will assist up to 240 Albertans every year in their journey towards recovery.

The Minister of Mental Health and Addictions, Milliken, has played a pivotal role in the government of Alberta's plan to make large investments in mental health and addiction treatment in the forthcoming Alberta budget 2023. The aim is to provide support to a larger number of Albertans in their pursuit of recovery. The budget will allocate more than $275 million towards addiction and mental health, which is the highest amount ever recorded in the region.

This significant increase in funding is in contrast to the mental health and addiction-specific budget of $87 million per year, recorded in 2019 when the current government assumed office. The Minister's commitment to improving the quality of life for all Albertans, regardless of age, is evidenced by the record investments in addiction and mental health. If passed, Budget 2023 will provide $275 million in funding for mental health and addiction treatment.

== Controversy ==
In July 2020 Milliken came under fire for, while sitting as Speaker, ejecting NDP member Marie Renaud out of the chamber during debate. Renaud noted that UCP members were bullying her while she was standing to speak to a bill. When Renaud refused to apologize for her comments, she was ejected. Milliken's impartiality was called into question since he focused the conflict on Renaud while failing to address the UCP members' behaviour.

== In the media ==
On Sunday January 8, 2023 Milliken posted a tweet from a British tabloid paper that was widely considered to be problematic and reflected a "bias against these individuals and a complete misunderstanding around the nature of addiction and homelessness". He took it down but when challenged on it reposted it with the headline highlighted before taking it down a second time. In a CTV article Lorian Hardcastle, a University of Calgary associate law professor specializing in health policy, characterized the tweet by the minister's account as "highly problematic," suggesting a potential misunderstanding of addiction and homelessness.

== Electoral history ==
2023 Alberta general election: Calgary-Currie
Party	Candidate	Votes	%	±%
New Democratic	Janet Eremenko	12,261	54.81	+11.94
United Conservative	Nicholas Milliken	9,181	41.04	-2.66
Alberta Party	Jason Avramenko	409	1.83	-9.19
Green	Lane Robson	222	0.99	–
Liberal	Leila Keith	216	0.97	-1.19
Solidarity Movement	Dawid Pawlowski	83	0.37	–
Total		22,372	99.12	–
Rejected and declined		198	0.88	
Turnout		22,570	62.39	
Eligible electors		36,178		
New Democratic gain from United Conservative		Swing		+7.30
Source(s) Source: Elections Alberta

2019 Alberta general election: Calgary-Currie
Party	Candidate	Votes	%	±%	Expenditures
United Conservative	Nicholas Milliken	9,960	43.70	-0.09	$74,793
New Democratic	Brian Malkinson	9,769	42.86	+3.60	$60,594
Alberta Party	Lindsay Luhnau	2,512	11.02	+3.47	$14,604
Liberal	Joshua Codd	491	2.15	-5.27	$8,132
Pro-Life	Lucas C. Hernandez	60	0.26	+0.25 (Note: Change from the Alberta Social Credit Party, who rebranded to the Pro-Life Alberta Political Association in 2017.)	$500
Total		22,792	98.77	–	
Rejected, spoiled and declined		284	1.23	–	
Turnout		23,076	66.20		
Eligible voters		34,857			
United Conservative notional hold		Swing		-1.84	
Source(s) Source: Elections Alberta Note: Expenses is the sum of "Election Expenses", "Other Expenses" and "Transfers Issued". The Elections Act limits "Election Expenses" to $50,000.
