= Calgary-Currie =

Provincial electoral district in Alberta, Canada

Coordinates: 51.04°N 114.14°W

Alberta electoral district
- Calgary-Currie within the City of Calgary, 2017 boundaries

Provincial electoral district
- Legislature: Legislative Assembly of Alberta
MLA
Janet Eremenko
New Democratic
- District created: 1971
- First contested: 1971
- Last contested: 2023

Calgary-Currie is a provincial electoral district in Calgary, Alberta, Canada. It was created in 1971 and is mandated to return a single member to the Legislative Assembly of Alberta using the first past the post method of voting.

The district is currently represented by Janet Eremenko, a member of the Alberta New Democratic Party (NDP) who was elected in the 2023 Alberta general election.

== History ==
The Calgary-Currie electoral district was created in the 1971 boundary redistribution from parts of Calgary Glenmore and Calgary West.

The 2010 boundary redistribution saw the riding significantly changed. The Electoral Boundary Commission originally tried to abolish the riding but several complaints were submitted to the commission. Instead the riding was completely redrawn with the north boundary pushed up to the Bow River from 17 Avenue SW into land that was part of Calgary-Bow and Calgary-Buffalo. The east boundary which had gone as far as 1 Street SE was moved west to 14 Street SW losing land to Buffalo and Calgary-Elbow. The south boundary was significantly revised with Elbow causing the riding to gain and lose land with that constituency in a few different places and finally the west boundary was straightened out to run along Sarcee Trail causing the riding to gain land from Calgary-West.

=== Boundary history ===
5 Calgary-Currie 2003 boundaries
Bordering districts
North	East	West	South
Calgary-Buffalo, Calgary-Bow	Calgary-Elbow	Calgary-West	Calgary-Elbow
riding map goes here			
Legal description from the Statutes of Alberta 2003, Electoral Divisions Act.
Starting at the intersection of Sarcee Trail SW with the westerly extension of 17 Avenue SW; then 1. east along the extension, 17 Avenue SW and 17 Avenue SE to 1 Street SE; 2. south along 1 Street SE to the left bank of the Elbow River; 3. southwest along the left bank of the Elbow River to the easterly extension of 29 Avenue SW; 4. west along the extension and 29 Avenue SW to 7 Street SW; 5. south along 7 Street SW to 30 Avenue SW; 6. west along 30 Avenue SW to Premier Way SW; 7. southwest along Premier Way SW to 10 Street SW; 8. south along 10 Street SW to Council Way SW; 9. west along Council Way SW to 14 Street SW; 10. south along 14 Street SW to 38 Avenue SW; 11. east along 38 Avenue SW to the northwest extension of the westerly boundary of Block 4, Plan 8035 AG; 12. southeast along the extension and the westerly block boundary and its southeast extension to the left bank of the Elbow River; 13. generally south and southeast along the left bank of the Elbow River to the east extension of 50 Avenue SW; 14. west along the extension and 50 Avenue SW to Crowchild Trail SW; 15. north along Crowchild Trail SW to Richmond Road SW; 16. southwest along Richmond Road SW to 37 Street SW; 17. north along 37 Street SW to 26 Avenue SW; 18. west along 26 Avenue SW to 40 Street SW; 19. south along 40 Street SW to 28 Avenue SW; 20. west along 28 Avenue SW to 43 Street SW; 21. north along 43 Street SW to 26 Avenue SW; 22. west along 26 Avenue SW and its westerly extension
Note:

7 Calgary-Currie 2010 boundaries
Bordering districts
North	East	West	South
Calgary-Mountain View and Calgary-Varsity	Calgary-Buffalo	Calgary-Bow and Calgary-West	Calgary-Elbow
Note: Boundary descriptions were not used in the 2010 redistribution

=== Electoral history ===
Calgary-Currie
Assembly	Years	Member	Party
Riding created from Calgary-Glenmore, Calgary Victoria Park and Calgary-West
17th	1971–1975	Fred Peacock	Progressive Conservative
18th	1975–1979	Fred Peacock	Progressive Conservative
19th	1979–1982	Dennis Anderson	Progressive Conservative
20th	1982–1986	Dennis Anderson	Progressive Conservative
21st	1986–1989	Dennis Anderson	Progressive Conservative
22nd	1989–1993	Jocelyn Burgener	Progressive Conservative
23rd	1993–1997	Jocelyn Burgener	Progressive Conservative
24th	1997–2001	Jocelyn Burgener	Progressive Conservative
25th	2001–2004	Jon Lord	Progressive Conservative
26th	2004–2008	Dave Taylor	Liberal
27th	2008–2010	Dave Taylor	Liberal
27th	2010–2011	Dave Taylor	Independent
27th	2011–2012	Dave Taylor	Alberta Party
28th	2012–2015	Christine Cusanelli	Progressive Conservative
29th	2015–2019	Brian Malkinson	New Democratic
30th	2019–2023	Nicholas Milliken	United Conservative
31st	2023–Present	Janet Eremenko	New Democratic

The Calgary-Currie electoral district was created in the boundary redistribution of 1971. The electoral district was named after the former Currie Army Barracks which used to exist in Southwest Calgary. The district replaced large portions of Calgary West and Calgary Glenmore.

The first general election in 1971 saw Progressive Conservative candidate Fred Peacock win a tight race over incumbent Social Credit member Frederick Colborne who had previously represented Calgary Centre. His old electoral district was abolished and he decided to run in Currie instead of Calgary-Buffalo.

During his first term Peacock served as a cabinet minister in the Lougheed government. He was re-elected for a second term in 1975 before he retired from provincial politics in 1979.

The second MLA to represent the district was Dennis Anderson. He won a large majority in the 1979 election. He was re-elected in 1982 with the highest popular vote in the districts history. He was also easily re-elected in 1986 and again in 1989 before retiring in 1993.

The third MLA was Progressive Conservative candidate Jocelyn Burgener who won a hotly contested election in 1993 against Mark Waters son of Senator Stan Waters and leader of the Alberta Political Alliance. She was re-elected in 1997 before retiring in 2001.

Former Calgary Alderman Jon Lord became the fourth representative for the district. He was elected with a large majority in the 2001 election. Lord ran for a second term but was defeated by Liberal candidate Dave Taylor, who was a talk radio host in Calgary prior to running for office.

Taylor was re-elected to his second term in 2008. After the election he ran for leadership of the Liberal party but was defeated by David Swann. He left the Liberal caucus on April 11, 2010, to sit as an independent. On January 24, 2011, Taylor joined the Alberta Party.

== Legislative election results ==
=== 2023 ===
2023 Alberta general election
Party	Candidate	Votes	%	±%
New Democratic	Janet Eremenko	12,261	54.81	+11.94
United Conservative	Nicholas Milliken	9,181	41.04	-2.66
Alberta Party	Jason Avramenko	409	1.83	-9.19
Green	Lane Robson	222	0.99	–
Liberal	Leila Keith	216	0.97	-1.19
Solidarity Movement	Dawid Pawlowski	83	0.37	–
Total		22,372	99.12	–
Rejected and declined		198	0.88	
Turnout		22,570	62.39	
Eligible electors		36,178		
New Democratic gain from United Conservative		Swing		+7.30
Source(s) Source: Elections Alberta

=== 2019 ===
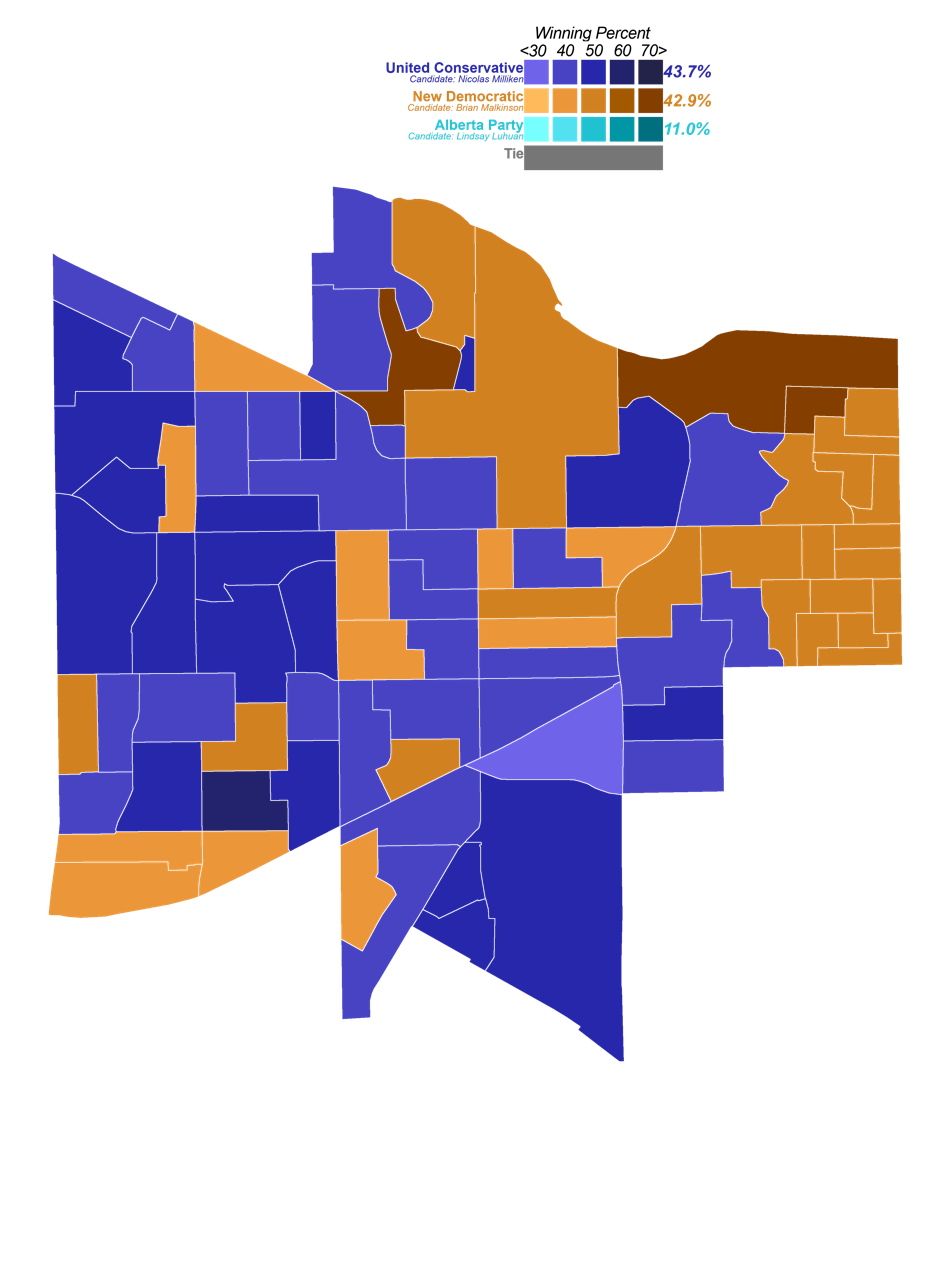
Results by Polling Division

2019 Alberta general election
Party	Candidate	Votes	%	±%	Expenditures
United Conservative	Nicholas Milliken	9,960	43.70	-0.09	$74,793
New Democratic	Brian Malkinson	9,769	42.86	+3.60	$60,594
Alberta Party	Lindsay Luhnau	2,512	11.02	+3.47	$14,604
Liberal	Joshua Codd	491	2.15	-5.27	$8,132
Pro-Life	Lucas C. Hernandez	60	0.26	+0.25 (Note: Change from the Alberta Social Credit Party, who rebranded to the Pro-Life Alberta Political Association in 2017.)	$500
Total		22,792	98.77	–	
Rejected, spoiled and declined		284	1.23	–	
Turnout		23,076	66.20		
Eligible voters		34,857			
United Conservative notional hold		Swing		-1.84	
Source(s) Source: Elections Alberta Note: Expenses is the sum of "Election Expenses", "Other Expenses" and "Transfers Issued". The Elections Act limits "Election Expenses" to $50,000.

=== 2015 ===
2015 Alberta general election
Party	Candidate	Votes	%	±%
New Democratic	Brian Malkinson	7,387	39.82%	34.37%
Progressive Conservative	Christine Cusanelli	4,577	24.67%	-20.29%
Wildrose	Terry Devries	3,769	20.31%	-8.57%
Liberal	Shelley Wark-Martyn	1,441	7.77%	-8.32%
Alberta Party	Tony Norman	1,006	5.42%	2.17%
Green	Nelson Berlin	373	2.01%	0.65%
Total		18,553	–	–
Rejected, spoiled and declined		82	48	7
Eligible electors / turnout		37,342	49.92%	-4.56%
New Democratic gain from Progressive Conservative		Swing		-0.47%
Source(s) Source: "07 - Calgary-Currie, 2015 Alberta general election". officialresults.elections.ab.ca. Elections Alberta.

2015 Alberta general election redistributed results
Party	Votes	%
New Democratic	7,104	39.27
Progressive Conservative	4,342	24.00
Wildrose	3,580	19.79
Alberta Party	1,367	7.56
Liberal	1,344	7.43
Green	352	1.95
Social Credit	3	0.02
Source(s) Source: Ridingbuilder

=== 2012 ===
2012 Alberta general election
Party	Candidate	Votes	%	±%
Progressive Conservative	Christine Cusanelli	7,394	44.96%	7.69%
Wildrose	Corrie Adolph	4,750	28.89%	23.40%
Liberal	Norval Horner	2,646	16.09%	-29.47%
New Democratic	Robert Scobel	896	5.45%	1.10%
Alberta Party	Norm Kelly	534	3.25%	–
Evergreen	Dean N. Halstead	224	1.36%	-5.64%
Total		16,444	–	–
Rejected, spoiled and declined		127	–	–
Eligible electors / turnout		30,415	54.48%	15.92%
Progressive Conservative gain from Liberal		Swing		3.90%
Source(s) Source: "07 - Calgary-Currie, 2012 Alberta general election". officialresults.elections.ab.ca. Elections Alberta.

=== 2008 ===
2008 Alberta general election
Party	Candidate	Votes	%	±%
Liberal	Dave Taylor	5,564	45.56%	0.05%
Progressive Conservative	Arthur Kent	4,552	37.27%	-2.52%
Green	Graham Mackenzie	896	7.34%	0.01%
Wildrose	Kenneth J.P. Mazeroll	670	5.49%	2.34%
New Democratic	Marc Power	531	4.35%	0.13%
Total		12,213	–	–
Rejected, spoiled and declined		63	9	2
Eligible electors / turnout		31,842	38.56%	-6.74%
Liberal hold		Swing		1.28%
Source(s) Source: "05 - Calgary-Currie, 2008 Alberta general election". officialresults.elections.ab.ca. Elections Alberta.

=== 2004 ===
2004 Alberta general election
Party	Candidate	Votes	%	±%
Liberal	Dave Taylor	5,046	45.51%	21.57%
Progressive Conservative	Jon Lord	4,412	39.79%	-22.36%
Green	Kim Warnke	813	7.33%	–
New Democratic	Robert Scobel	468	4.22%	-5.78%
Alberta Alliance	Ken Mazeroll	348	3.14%	–
Total		11,087	–	–
Rejected, spoiled and declined		58	–	–
Eligible electors / turnout		24,603	45.30%	-2.97%
Liberal gain from Progressive Conservative		Swing		-16.24%
Source(s) Source: "Calgary-Currie Statement of Official Results 2004 Alberta general election" (PDF). Elections Alberta.

=== 2001 ===
2001 Alberta general election
Party	Candidate	Votes	%	±%
Progressive Conservative	Jon Lord	6,922	62.15%	8.14%
Liberal	Pat Murray	2,667	23.95%	-9.05%
New Democratic	Garth Mundle	1,114	10.00%	3.54%
Independent	J. Bruce Miller	434	3.90%	–
Total		11,137	–	–
Rejected, spoiled and declined		72	–	–
Eligible electors / turnout		23,220	48.27%	-0.95%
Progressive Conservative hold		Swing		8.59%
Source(s) Source: "Calgary-Currie Official Results 2001 Alberta general election". Alberta Heritage Community Foundation.

=== 1997 ===
1997 Alberta general election
Party	Candidate	Votes	%	±%
Progressive Conservative	Jocelyn Burgener	5,952	54.02%	6.15%
Liberal	Mairi Matheson	3,636	33.00%	-0.37%
New Democratic	Liz Blackwood	712	6.46%	-3.73%
Social Credit	Jeff Townsend	610	5.54%	–
Natural Law	Richard Shelford	109	0.99%	–
Total		11,019	–	–
Rejected, spoiled and declined		39	–	–
Eligible electors / turnout		22,464	49.23%	-8.48%
Progressive Conservative hold		Swing		3.26%
Source(s) Source: "Calgary-Currie Official Results 1997 Alberta general election". Alberta Heritage Community Foundation.

=== 1993 ===
1993 Alberta general election
Party	Candidate	Votes	%	±%
Progressive Conservative	Jocelyn Burgener	6,699	47.87%	-1.75%
Liberal	Mairi Matheson	4,670	33.37%	-0.23%
New Democratic	Ilona Boyce	1,426	10.19%	-6.60%
Alliance	Mark Waters	1,200	8.57%	–
Total		13,995	–	–
Rejected, spoiled and declined		44	–	–
Eligible electors / turnout		24,327	57.71%	5.97%
Progressive Conservative hold		Swing		-0.76%
Source(s) Source: "Calgary-Currie Official Results 1993 Alberta general election". Alberta Heritage Community Foundation.

=== 1989 ===
1989 Alberta general election
Party	Candidate	Votes	%	±%
Progressive Conservative	Dennis L. Anderson	5,072	49.62%	-9.99%
Liberal	Mairi Matheson	3,434	33.59%	13.57%
New Democratic	Bruce McGuigan	1,716	16.79%	-1.19%
Total		10,222	–	–
Rejected, spoiled and declined		34	–	–
Eligible electors / turnout		19,824	51.74%	4.68%
Progressive Conservative hold		Swing		-11.78%
Source(s) Source: "Calgary-Currie Official Results 1989 Alberta general election". Alberta Heritage Community Foundation.

=== 1986 ===
1986 Alberta general election
Party	Candidate	Votes	%	±%
Progressive Conservative	Dennis L. Anderson	5,483	59.61%	-16.05%
Liberal	Rork Hilford	1,842	20.03%	14.68%
New Democratic	Glenn Miller	1,654	17.98%	6.93%
Independent	Peter Grizans	219	2.38%	–
Total		9,198	–	–
Rejected, spoiled and declined		14	–	–
Eligible electors / turnout		19,578	47.05%	-17.81%
Progressive Conservative hold		Swing		-12.51%
Source(s) Source: "Calgary-Currie Official Results 1986 Alberta general election". Alberta Heritage Community Foundation.

=== 1982 ===
1982 Alberta general election
Party	Candidate	Votes	%	±%
Progressive Conservative	Dennis L. Anderson	9,701	75.66%	15.99%
New Democratic	Glenn Miller	1,417	11.05%	2.02%
Western Canada Concept	Darwin M. Sorenson	1,018	7.94%	–
Liberal	Rork Hilford	686	5.35%	-1.49%
Total		12,822	–	–
Rejected, spoiled and declined		25	–	–
Eligible electors / turnout		19,805	64.87%	5.01%
Progressive Conservative hold		Swing		14.70%
Source(s) Source: "Calgary-Currie Official Results 1982 Alberta general election". Alberta Heritage Community Foundation.

=== 1979 ===
1979 Alberta general election
Party	Candidate	Votes	%	±%
Progressive Conservative	Dennis L. Anderson	6,885	59.67%	-13.38%
Social Credit	Charles S. Dunkley	2,822	24.46%	13.15%
New Democratic	Glenn Miller	1,042	9.03%	0.45%
Liberal	Jerry Arshinoff	789	6.84%	-0.22%
Total		11,538	–	–
Rejected, spoiled and declined		20	–	–
Eligible electors / turnout		19,309	59.86%	2.71%
Progressive Conservative hold		Swing		-13.27%
Source(s) Source: "Calgary-Currie Official Results 1979 Alberta general election". Alberta Heritage Community Foundation.

=== 1975 ===
1975 Alberta general election
Party	Candidate	Votes	%	±%
Progressive Conservative	Fred H. Peacock	6,068	73.06%	24.06%
Social Credit	Edwin Ens	939	11.31%	-32.32%
New Democratic	Hiram Coulter	713	8.58%	1.21%
Liberal	Ron Chahal	586	7.06%	–
Total		8,306	–	–
Rejected, spoiled and declined		23	–	–
Eligible electors / turnout		14,574	57.15%	-17.28%
Progressive Conservative hold		Swing		28.19%
Source(s) Source: "Calgary-Currie Official Results 1975 Alberta general election". Alberta Heritage Community Foundation.

=== 1971 ===
1971 Alberta general election
Party	Candidate	Votes	%	±%
Progressive Conservative	Fred H. Peacock	5,255	49.00%	–
Social Credit	Frederick C. Colborne	4,679	43.63%	–
New Democratic	Margaret I. Jackson	791	7.38%	–
Total		10,725	–	–
Rejected, spoiled and declined		48	–	–
Eligible electors / turnout		14,475	74.42%	–
Progressive Conservative pickup new district.				
Source(s) Source: "Calgary-Currie Official Results 1971 Alberta general election". Alberta Heritage Community Foundation.

== Senate nominee election results ==
=== 2004 ===
2004 Senate nominee election results: Calgary-Currie				Turnout 45.35%	
Affiliation	Candidate	Votes	% votes	% ballots	Rank
Progressive Conservative	Bert Brown	3,813	15.73%	45.50%	1
Progressive Conservative	Jim Silye	3,628	14.97%	43.29%	5
Progressive Conservative	Betty Unger	3,159	13.03%	37.70%	2
Independent	Link Byfield	3,061	12.63%	36.53%	4
Independent	Tom Sindlinger	2,653	10.95%	31.66%	9
Progressive Conservative	David Usherwood	2,161	8.92%	25.79%	6
Progressive Conservative	Cliff Breitkreuz	1,960	8.09%	23.39%	3
Alberta Alliance	Vance Gough	1,420	5.86%	16.95%	8
Alberta Alliance	Michael Roth	1,280	5.28%	15.28%	7
Alberta Alliance	Gary Horan	1,105	4.54%	13.19%	10
Total votes		24,240	100%		
Total ballots		8,380	2.89 votes per ballot		
Rejected, spoiled and declined		2,778			
24,603 eligible electors

Voters had the option of selecting four candidates on the ballot

== Student vote results ==
=== 2004 ===
Participating schools
Alternative High School
Crescent Heights High School
Dr. Oakley School
St. Marys High School
Western Canada High School
Westmount Charter School

On November 19, 2004, a student vote was conducted at participating Alberta schools to parallel the 2004 Alberta general election results. The vote was designed to educate students and simulate the electoral process for persons who have not yet reached the legal majority. The vote was conducted in 80 of the 83 provincial electoral districts with students voting for actual election candidates. Schools with a large student body that reside in another electoral district had the option to vote for candidates outside of the electoral district then where they were physically located.

2004 Alberta student vote results
Affiliation	Candidate	Votes	%
Liberal	Dave Taylor	266	32.96%
Progressive Conservative	Jon Lord	203	25.16%
Green	Kim Warnke	173	21.44%
New Democratic	Robert Scobel	109	13.51%
Alberta Alliance	Ken Mazeroll	56	6.93%
Total		807	100%
Rejected, spoiled and declined		37	

== See also ==
- List of Alberta provincial electoral districts
- Canadian provincial electoral districts
