= Dave Taylor (Canadian politician) =

Canadian politician

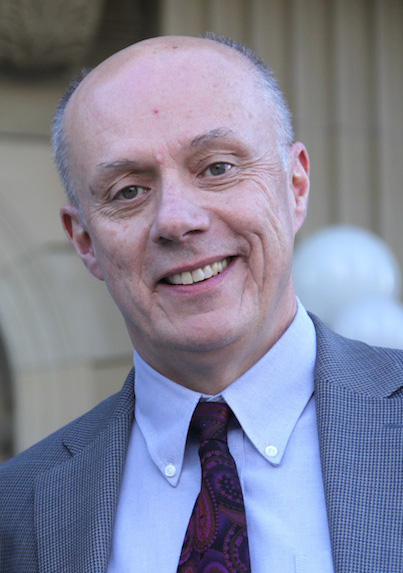
- Taylor in 2011

Member of the Legislative Assembly of Alberta
- In office November 22, 2004 – April 23, 2012
- Preceded by: John Lord
- Succeeded by: Christine Cusanelli
- Constituency: Calgary-Currie

Personal details
- Born: September 20, 1953 (age 72) Sarnia, Ontario
- Party: Alberta Party (January 2011-Present)
- Other political affiliations: Independent (2010-January 2011); Liberal (2004-2010)
- Spouse: Martha Taylor

Dave Taylor (born September 20, 1953) is a Canadian politician and former radio talk show host who represented the electoral division of Calgary-Currie in the Legislative Assembly of Alberta. Taylor was a member of the Alberta Liberal Party and ran for its leadership in 2008 but lost to David Swann. In April 2010, Taylor left the party to sit as an Independent, but in January 2011 he joined the Alberta Party, becoming that party's first MLA.

== Background ==
Born in 1953 in Sarnia, Taylor worked in Ontario as a broadcast journalist for many years, most notably at the legendary CHUM, Toronto, before accepting the job of News Director at CKIK-FM (now CFGQ-FM) in Calgary in 1985. He later moved to CHQR and hosted a daytime talk show until he took a leave of absence to run in the November 22, 2004 provincial election. He has also taught at Mount Royal University and has been involved in community government for many years.

== Political life ==
=== First term ===
Taylor first ran and was elected in the riding of Calgary-Currie in the 2004 election. During his first term Taylor served as Deputy Leader to leader Kevin Taft and also sat on these government committees:

- Deputy chair of the Standing Committee on Managing Growth Pressures
- Members’ Services Committee.

On October 11, 2006, he hosted a townhall meeting to discuss solutions to the housing crisis specifically in Calgary but also for all of Alberta.

=== Second term ===
He was re-elected as a Liberal in the 2008 Alberta general election although the Liberals lost seven seats. In the new legislature, he serves on the following committees;

- Privileges and Elections, Standing Orders and Printing Committee
- Special Standing Committee on Members Services
- Deputy chair of the Standing Committee on the Economy

After the Alberta Liberals lost more seats in the 2008 general election Kevin Taft resigned as leader. Taylor was the Deputy leader of the party at the time and was the first to announce intentions to run for the Liberal leadership. He believed that the Alberta Liberal party had a lot to build on, and he hoped as a leader to have the opportunity to get the sixty percent of Albertans who stayed home on election day re-engaged in the political process. The leadership election was held on December 12, 2008 and David Swann was elected leader with 2,468 votes on the first ballot. Taylor won 1,616 votes finishing second and Mo Elsalhy won 491 votes finishing third.

In April 2010, Taylor decided to leave the Liberal party and sit as an Independent. He claimed the move was because the Liberal party under Swann had become directionless and had failed to present Albertans with an attractive alternative to the Progressive Conservative party. In January 2011, Taylor joined the fledgling Alberta Party, becoming that party's first MLA. Taylor said: "The Alberta Party is a good fit with my values and my principles. I can be very comfortable with these people." Taylor had previously stated that he would resign and run in a byelection if he joined another party: "If I were to make a decision that I thought I would want to run as a member of some other party, then I would wait until the next election or resign and go through a byelection," he said. "Nobody voted for Dave Taylor as a candidate for another party." Taylor said that despite his statement he would not call for a byelection, arguing that the next general election was near enough that spending money on a byelection now would be fiscally irresponsible. Additionally, the Alberta Party does require consultation at the constituency level for a sitting MLA to join their party. Taylor chose to retire when the 2012 Alberta election was called.

== Electoral record ==
=== 2004 general election ===
2004 Alberta general election: Calgary-Currie
Party	Candidate	Votes	%	±%
Liberal	Dave Taylor	5,046	45.51%	21.57%
Progressive Conservative	Jon Lord	4,412	39.79%	-22.36%
Green	Kim Warnke	813	7.33%	–
New Democratic	Robert Scobel	468	4.22%	-5.78%
Alberta Alliance	Ken Mazeroll	348	3.14%	–
Total		11,087	–	–
Rejected, spoiled and declined		58	–	–
Eligible electors / turnout		24,603	45.30%	-2.97%
Liberal gain from Progressive Conservative		Swing		-16.24%
Source(s) Source: "Calgary-Currie Statement of Official Results 2004 Alberta general election" (PDF). Elections Alberta.

=== 2008 general election ===
2008 Alberta general election: Calgary-Currie
Party	Candidate	Votes	%	±%
Liberal	Dave Taylor	5,564	45.56%	0.05%
Progressive Conservative	Arthur Kent	4,552	37.27%	-2.52%
Green	Graham Mackenzie	896	7.34%	0.01%
Wildrose	Kenneth J.P. Mazeroll	670	5.49%	2.34%
New Democratic	Marc Power	531	4.35%	0.13%
Total		12,213	–	–
Rejected, spoiled and declined		63	9	2
Eligible electors / turnout		31,842	38.56%	-6.74%
Liberal hold		Swing		1.28%
Source(s) Source: "05 - Calgary-Currie, 2008 Alberta general election". officialresults.elections.ab.ca. Elections Alberta.
