= Sheldon Chumir =

Canadian lawyer and politician

Member of the Legislative Assembly of Alberta
- In office 1986 – January 26, 1992
- Preceded by: Brian Lee
- Succeeded by: Gary Dickson
- Constituency: Calgary-Buffalo

Personal details
- Born: December 3, 1940 Calgary, Alberta, Canada
- Died: January 26, 1992 (aged 51) Calgary, Alberta, Canada
- Party: Alberta Liberal Party
- Education: University of Alberta
- Profession: Lawyer

Sheldon Mervin Chumir (December 3, 1940 – January 26, 1992) was a lawyer and politician from Alberta, Canada.

Sheldon Chumir was born in Calgary to a Jewish family. He studied law at the University of Alberta, from which he graduated in 1963 with the gold medal. He continued his education as a Rhodes Scholar and earned a Bachelor of Letters degree from Oxford University in 1965.

== Law, business career and political activism ==
Chumir began his professional career as a tax lawyer with the federal Department of Justice in Toronto. In 1971, he joined a Calgary law firm. In 1976, he launched his own private practice focusing on civil liberties cases which on occasion provided representation on a pro bono basis. He lectured on civil liberties and human rights at the University of Calgary Law School and founded the Calgary Civil Liberties Association. He was also an entrepreneur; he founded a small oil and gas company, co-founded the entertainment promotion firm Brimstone Productions and engaged in real estate.

In 1983, he ventured into activism by creating Save Public Education, an organization which opposed public funding of religious schools. The group ran a successful slate of candidates in a Calgary Board of Education election.

== Political career ==
In the 1986 Alberta general election, he ran as a Liberal in the riding of Calgary-Buffalo and defeated incumbent Brian Lee of the Progressive Conservative Party. He was among the first four Liberals elected to the Legislative Assembly of Alberta since 1969. In the Assembly, he advocated on legal affairs, human rights, energy, finance and community service, and he advocated legislation that supported human rights and civil liberties. He was re-elected in 1989.

== Death and legacy ==
Chumir died in 1992, from cancer. Having no close kin, he had set up his estate to establish the Sheldon Chumir Foundation for Ethics Leadership. As a politician and human rights lawyer Chumir was an advocate for human rights and believed ethical values are fundamental to a healthy society. The foundation was intended to advocate for leadership and legislature to further the advancement of democratic legislation and social reform. The foundation offers internships and scholarships for students studying the field of Leadership and Law, publishes material pertaining to civil rights, and supports initiatives in the community.

The Sheldon M. Chumir Centre, an eight-story medical facility named in honor of Chumir, opened in Calgary in April 2008. The facility includes an Urgent Care Centre, Mental Health clinic, Diagnostic Imaging department and the Southern Alberta HIV Clinic.

Chumir was called one of Alberta's New Mavericks by Jamie Komarnicki of the Calgary Herald, who in Chumir's obituary described him as a "soft-spoken man with a quirky sense of humour [who] was a determined champion of public education and individual freedoms."

In 2012, Chumir was posthumously honored by the Calgary Stampede Foundation with the centennial edition of the Western Legacy Award. This unique edition award recognized contributions of 100 Calgarians and their services to Calgary.

Legislative Assembly of Alberta
Preceded by Brian Lee	MLA Calgary-Buffalo; 1986-1992	Succeeded by Gary Dickson
