= Christine Cusanelli =

Canadian politician

The Honourable Christine Cusanelli ECA

Member of the Alberta Legislative Assembly for Calgary-Currie
- In office April 23, 2012 – May 5, 2015
- Preceded by: Dave Taylor
- Succeeded by: Brian Malkinson

Minister of Tourism, Parks and Recreation
- In office May 8, 2012 – February 4, 2013
- Preceded by: Jack Hayden
- Succeeded by: Richard Starke

Personal details
- Born: July 15, 1972 (age 54)
- Party: Progressive Conservative
- Education: University of Alberta
- Profession: Educator

Christine Cusanelli ECA (born July 15, 1972) is a former Canadian politician who represented the electoral district of Calgary-Currie in the Alberta Legislature from 2012 to 2015. Cusanelli was elected to her first term as MLA for Calgary-Currie on April 23, 2012. Cusanelli was the minister for Tourism, Parks, and Recreation from May 8, 2012, until February 4, 2013. On May 5, 2015, she was voted out of office in Alberta's general election, losing her seat to Brian Malkinson of the Alberta New Democratic Party.

== Education and work ==
Cusanelli has a Bachelor of Education degree from Faculté Saint-Jean at the University of Alberta, and a master's degree in psychology from Gonzaga University in Spokane, Washington. She started her career as a teacher with the Calgary Catholic School District where she taught elementary and junior-high students in French immersion and other educational settings.

In 2012, while in Alison Redford's cabinet, Cusanelli was forced to repay $10,600 in expenses, including $4,078 in airfare incurred after she flew her daughter and mother to the 2012 Summer Olympics in London. In response to media questions, Cusanelli said the expenses were charged as a result of a misunderstanding.

== Interests ==
Her personal interests include running, cycling, swimming and golfing.

She is a member of Chickwagon, a Calgary women's group that raises money and awareness for women in need.

== Election results ==
2015 Alberta general election: Calgary-Currie
Party	Candidate	Votes	%	±%
New Democratic	Brian Malkinson	7,387	39.82%	34.37%
Progressive Conservative	Christine Cusanelli	4,577	24.67%	-20.29%
Wildrose	Terry Devries	3,769	20.31%	-8.57%
Liberal	Shelley Wark-Martyn	1,441	7.77%	-8.32%
Alberta Party	Tony Norman	1,006	5.42%	2.17%
Green	Nelson Berlin	373	2.01%	0.65%
Total		18,553	–	–
Rejected, spoiled and declined		82	48	7
Eligible electors / turnout		37,342	49.92%	-4.56%
New Democratic gain from Progressive Conservative		Swing		-0.47%
Source(s) Source: "07 - Calgary-Currie, 2015 Alberta general election". officialresults.elections.ab.ca. Elections Alberta.

2012 Alberta general election: Calgary-Currie
Party	Candidate	Votes	%	±%
Progressive Conservative	Christine Cusanelli	7,394	44.96%	7.69%
Wildrose	Corrie Adolph	4,750	28.89%	23.40%
Liberal	Norval Horner	2,646	16.09%	-29.47%
New Democratic	Robert Scobel	896	5.45%	1.10%
Alberta Party	Norm Kelly	534	3.25%	–
Evergreen	Dean N. Halstead	224	1.36%	-5.64%
Total		16,444	–	–
Rejected, spoiled and declined		127	–	–
Eligible electors / turnout		30,415	54.48%	15.92%
Progressive Conservative gain from Liberal		Swing		3.90%
Source(s) Source: "07 - Calgary-Currie, 2012 Alberta general election". officialresults.elections.ab.ca. Elections Alberta.
