= Arthur Kent =

Canadian television journalist

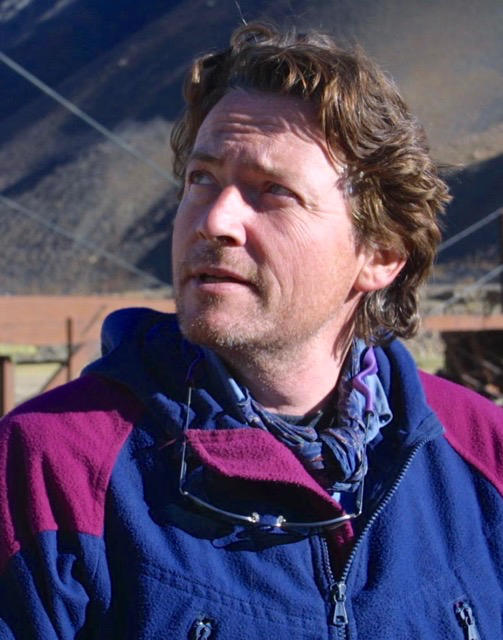
- Kent in 2001
- Born: December 27, 1953 (age 72); Medicine Hat, Alberta, Canada
- Education: Carleton University, Ottawa
- Occupation: Journalist
- Years active: 1973–present
- Spouse: Vickie Lynn Mercy (m. 1981; div. 1983)
- Parent(s): Arthur Parker Kent, Aileen Marie Fears

Arthur Kent (born December 27, 1953) is a Canadian television journalist and author. He rose to international prominence during the 1991 Persian Gulf War during which he acquired the nickname "The Scud Stud". He is the brother of Canada's former Minister of the Environment Peter Kent.

== Early life and education ==
Kent was born in Medicine Hat, Alberta. His father, Arthur Parker Kent, worked for Southam Newspaper Group and retired as associate editor of the Calgary Herald. After his father's retirement, Arthur Kent began his journalism career at the Calgary Herald in the summer of 1973.

Kent graduated from Carleton University in Ottawa in 1975 while working as a general assignment reporter for CJOH, Ottawa's CTV station.

== Career ==
In 1977, after moving to the Canadian Broadcasting Corporation, Kent was named Alberta correspondent for The National, CBC's principal TV newscast. Three years later, Kent left CBC to become an independent reporter and photographer, eventually filing jointly to NBC News, CBC and London's The Observer newspaper.

In 1982, Kent produced Class of 1984.

In 1989, Kent joined NBC News as the network's Rome correspondent. Kent won 1989 Emmy Awards for his part in NBC's coverage of the June 4, 1989, Tiananmen Square Massacre and the December 1989 Romanian Revolution.

After a contract dispute with NBC, he was fired in August 1992. He subsequently sued NBC for breach of contract, fraud, and defamation, a case that was settled in March 1994.

Under the terms of the agreement, NBC paid Kent a large settlement and retracted prior statements about Kent and the dispute. Kent also won the right to publish testimony and evidence from the discovery phase of the suit in his book, Risk and Redemption: Surviving the Network News Wars.

He subsequently returned to Canada to host CBC Television's Man Alive. With the settlement from NBC, he established his own film company, Fast Forward Films, in the UK.

Kent has worked for the BBC, The Observer and Maclean's. He has hosted many History Channel shows including History Undercover and History's Mysteries. Afghanistan: Captives of the Warlords was shot secretly using a hidden camera, which shows life in Afghanistan under the repressive Taliban, contrasted with life under the much more lenient Northern Alliance. First broadcast by PBS in June 2001, an updated version received extensive broadcast on PBS affiliates and on CBC following the September 11 attacks. It received the Gold World Medal at the New York festivals, and a Golden Eagle award from CINE.

In 2007, Kent launched skyreporter.com, an outlet for new and archived documentaries and short films. Composed of one- to two-minute pieces from Afghanistan, London, Bosnia, Iraq, and other places, Sky Reporter features Kent's independent reportage and commentary direct from the field.

In 2008, Kent sued the producers and distributors of the film Charlie Wilson's War, claiming that the movie used material Kent produced in the 1980s without permission. On September 19, 2008, Kent announced he had reached a settlement with whose terms he was "very pleased"; the terms of the settlement remain confidential.

In 2019, he released a thirteen-minute film, titled Black Night In June, which consists of restored footage from his coverage of the 1989 Tiananmen Square Massacre, in honour of its thirtieth anniversary.

== Works ==
- Kent, Arthur (8 April 2021). Murder in Room 117: Solving the Cold Case That Led to America's Longest War. Skywriter Communications Incorporated. ISBN 978-1-7361482-0-4.

== Political campaign and defamation lawsuit ==
In November 2007, Kent was chosen by local party members as the Progressive Conservative candidate for the Alberta provincial riding of Calgary Currie. During the 2008 election, newspapers including the National Post and Calgary Herald published an article written by Don Martin about Kent and his campaign that was ruled defamatory by Alberta's Court of Queen's Bench in a June 2016 trial judgment. Canada's largest newspaper chain, Postmedia Network Inc., was found liable for defamation after Postmedia published the Martin article on its websites until November 2012. Kent won $200,000 in damages. On January 16, 2017, the trial judge awarded Kent costs of $250,000. Kent appealed the decision, asking Alberta's Court of Appeal to find the defendants' "intentional strategic decision to conceal" key email records was, in fact, fraudulent concealment. In a decision on May 25, 2018, the Court of Appeal agreed with Kent, awarding him an additional $200,000 in costs, and ruling: "we respectfully disagree with the trial judge's conclusion that the appellant's allegations of fraudulent concealment and the giving of false evidence were unproven. It follows that the trial judge erred in penalizing the appellant for having made these allegations."

Neither Postmedia nor Martin have acknowledged or expressed contrition for the offences found by the courts. Postmedia's financial predicament, combined with the resignation of director David Pecker, who was granted immunity by U.S. federal prosecutors investigating President Trump's former personal attorney, prompted Canada's National Observer to comment that "ethical journalism may not be a priority to (Postmedia's) owners, as revealed in Arthur Kent's defamation lawsuit against the company."

Kent lost the March 3, 2008, election to incumbent Dave Taylor.

== Affiliations ==
Kent is or has been affiliated with various media agencies and groups, including being:

- A member of the International Federation of Journalists.
- A member of Britain's National Union of Journalists.
- A member of PEN Canada.
- A member of The Writers' Union of Canada.
- A former board member of Military Reporters and Editors of America.
- A co-founder of TVNewscan, a project of The George Washington University School of Media and Public Affairs.
