= Tom Sindlinger =

Canadian politician

Thomas Sindlinger

Leader of the Alberta Reform Movement
- In office 1981–1982

Member of the Legislative Assembly for Calgary-Buffalo
- Preceded by: Ron Ghitter
- Succeeded by: Brian Lee
- In office March 14, 1979 – November 2, 1982

Personal details
- Born: Camrose, Alberta
- Party: Alberta Reform Movement
- Other political affiliations: Progressive Conservative (until 1981)
- Profession: Politician, Consultant

Thomas L. Sindlinger (born September 2, 1941) is a politician in Alberta, Canada, and former member of the Legislative Assembly of Alberta. He was born in Camrose, Alberta.

Sindlinger was elected as a member for the district of Calgary-Buffalo in the 1979 for the Progressive Conservatives. He disagreed with his party on matters relating to the Heritage Trust Fund and freedom of information. He was subsequently pressured to leave the P.C. legislature caucus. In 1981 he sat as an Independent Conservative, until he founded the Alberta Reform Movement.

He led the newly formed Alberta Reform Movement into the 1982 Alberta election. The party did not do well, as it was still at a very early stage of formation, without the resources to fight a snap election, and had to compete against a number of other right wing parties. Sindlinger ended up losing his seat in a second-place result.

More recently Sindlinger has been promoting Senate Reform, running as an independent senator-in-waiting candidate in both the 1989 and 2004 elections.

Aside from his political career, his private business is travelling around the world providing economic consulting for private companies and government projects. He was also inducted into the Lethbridge Sports Hall of Fame. He has a bachelor's and master's degree of Business and Economics.

== Electoral record ==
1979 Alberta general election: Calgary-Buffalo
Party	Candidate	Votes	%	±%
Progressive Conservative	Tom Sindlinger	6,481	64.02%	-6.86%
Social Credit	Jim Rocker	1,432	14.15%	5.61%
Liberal	Lloyd Hamilton	1,096	10.83%	0.38%
New Democratic	Brian Rees	1,052	10.39%	0.86%
Communist	David Willis	62	0.61%	0.01%
Total		10,123	–	–
Rejected, spoiled and declined		39	–	–
Eligible electors / turnout		24,091	42.18%	-8.49%
Progressive Conservative hold		Swing		-5.28%
Source(s) Source: "Calgary-Buffalo Official Results 1979 Alberta general election". Alberta Heritage Community Foundation.

1982 Alberta general election: Calgary-Buffalo
Party	Candidate	Votes	%	±%
Progressive Conservative	Brian Craig Lee	7,591	62.27%	-1.75%
Alberta Reform Movement	Tom Sindlinger	2,649	21.73%	–
New Democratic	Barry Pashak	1,211	9.93%	-0.46%
Western Canada Concept	Anita Bozak	739	6.06%	–
Total		12,190	–	–
Rejected, spoiled and declined		52	–	–
Eligible electors / turnout		24,764	49.43%	7.25%
Progressive Conservative hold		Swing		-4.67%
Source(s) Source: "Calgary-Buffalo Official Results 1982 Alberta general election". Alberta Heritage Community Foundation.

2004 Alberta Senate nominee election
Candidate	Party	Votes #	Votes %	Ballots %	Elected	Appointed
Bert Brown	Progressive Conservative	312,041	14.3%	43.7%	✓	July 10, 2007
Betty Unger	Progressive Conservative	311,964	14.3%	43.6%	✓	January 6, 2012
Cliff Breitkreuz	Progressive Conservative	241,306	11.1%	33.8%	✓	Term ended March 26, 2012
Link Byfield	Independent	238,751	11.0%	33.4%	✓	Resigned November 2010
Jim Silye	Progressive Conservative	217,857	10.0%	30.5%		
David Usherwood	Progressive Conservative	193,056	8.9%	27.0%		
Michael Roth	Alberta Alliance	176,339	8.1%	24.7%		
Vance Gough	Alberta Alliance	167,770	7.7%	23.5%		
Tom Sindlinger	Independent	161,082	7.4%	22.5%		
Gary Horan	Alberta Alliance	156,175	7.2%	21.9%		

Source: Elections Alberta

Note:

- For results by district please see districts listed in the 2004 Alberta general election.

Legislative Assembly of Alberta
Preceded by Ron Ghitter	MLA Calgary-Buffalo; 1979–1982	Succeeded by Brian Lee
Party political offices
Preceded by New Party	Alberta Reform Movement Leader; 1981–1982	Succeeded by Defunct Party
