= Rod Love =

Canadian political strategist

- Born: August 5, 1953; Yorkton, Saskatchewan, Canada
- Died: October 26, 2014 (aged 61); Calgary, Alberta, Canada
- Education: University of Alberta; University of Calgary
- Occupation: political strategist
- Known for: Former chief of staff for Ralph Klein
- Spouse: Charlene
- Children: 3

Roderick Michael Love (August 5, 1953 – October 26, 2014) was a Canadian political strategist. He served as chief of staff to Ralph Klein during Klein's tenure as Mayor of Calgary and Premier of Alberta.

== Political career ==
He was born in Yorkton, Saskatchewan, in 1953. In 1992, he ran in the Calgary-Buffalo by-election as Progressive Conservative, receiving just 15% of the vote. In 1998, he established Rod Love Consulting Inc.

Love attended the University of Alberta and the University of Calgary and was a member of the board of governors of the University of Calgary and the Canada West Foundation.

In 2012, Love was a co-host with Karin Klassen of Type A, a CBC Radio One talk show about the Canadian economy. He died at home surrounded by his family on October 26, 2014, of pancreatic cancer, aged 61.
