= Brian Malkinson =

Canadian politician

The Honourable Brian Malkinson ECA
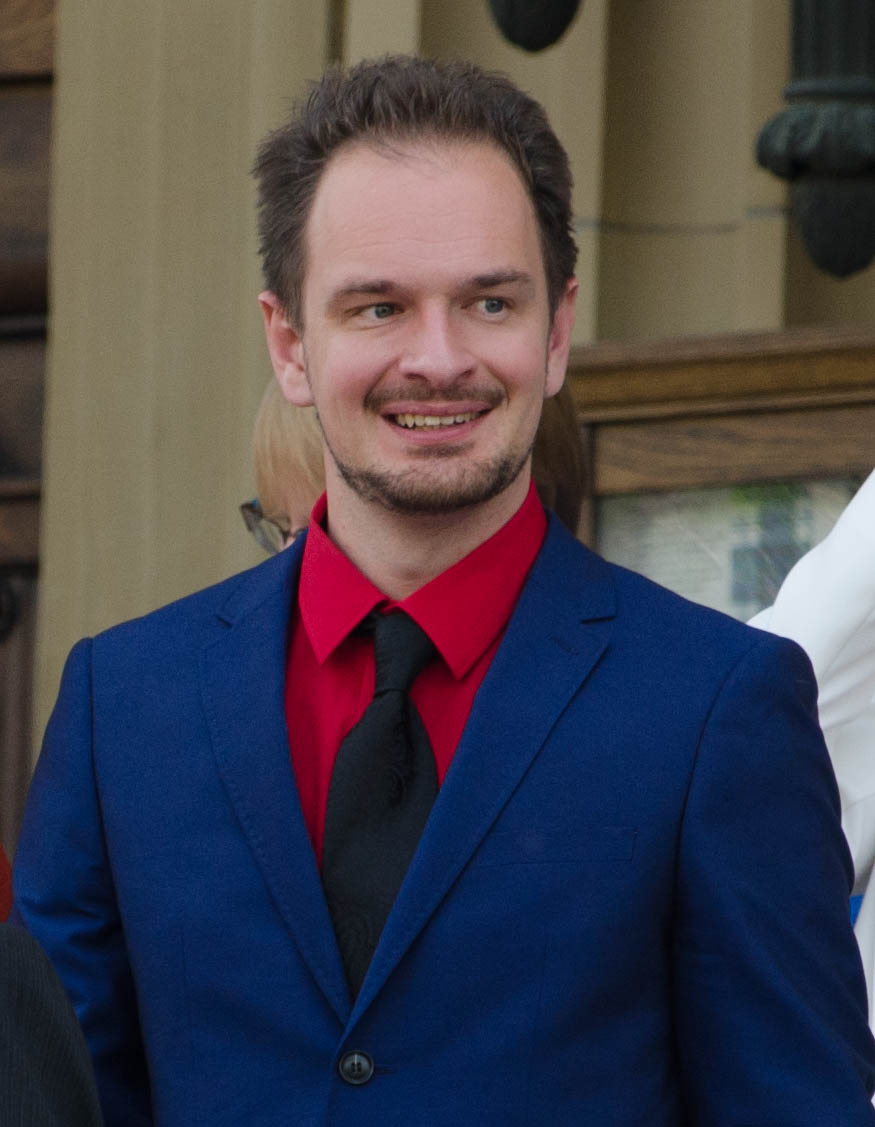
- Malkinson in May 2015

Minister of Service Alberta
- In office June 18, 2018 – April 30, 2019
- Premier: Rachel Notley
- Preceded by: Stephanie McLean
- Succeeded by: Nate Glubish

Member of the Legislative Assembly of Alberta for Calgary-Currie
- In office May 5, 2015 – March 19, 2019
- Preceded by: Christine Cusanelli
- Succeeded by: Nicholas Milliken

Personal details
- Born: 1985 (age 40–41) British Columbia, Canada
- Party: Alberta New Democratic Party
- Occupation: Heavy equipment salesman

Brian Lawrence Malkinson ECA (born 1985) is a Canadian politician who was elected in the 2015 Alberta general election to the Legislative Assembly of Alberta representing the electoral district of Calgary-Currie. Between 2018 and 2019, he served as the Minister of Service Alberta. He was defeated in his re-election bid in the 2019 Alberta general election by 191 votes to Nicholas Milliken.

== Education ==
Brian has a Bachelor of Science (programming) from Simon Fraser University in British Columbia, where he also served as president and vice-president of the Interactive Arts and Technology Student Union.

== 29th Alberta Legislature ==
=== Legislative Committees ===
Malkinson served as deputy chair of the Select Special Ombudsman and Public Interest Commissioner Search Committee and the Standing Committee on Legislative Offices. He also served as a member of the Standing Committee on Public Accounts and the Standing Committee on Resource Stewardship. Malkinson previously served as a member of the Standing Committee on Alberta Heritage Savings Trust Fund.

== Electoral history ==
=== 2019 general election ===
2019 Alberta general election: Calgary-Currie
| Party | Candidate | Votes | % | ±% | Expenditures |
|---|---|---|---|---|---|
| United Conservative | Nicholas Milliken | 9,960 | 43.70 | -0.09 | $74,793 |
| New Democratic | Brian Malkinson | 9,769 | 42.86 | +3.60 | $60,594 |
| Alberta Party | Lindsay Luhnau | 2,512 | 11.02 | +3.47 | $14,604 |
| Liberal | Joshua Codd | 491 | 2.15 | -5.27 | $8,132 |
| Pro-Life | Lucas C. Hernandez | 60 | 0.26 | +0.25 (Note: Change from the Alberta Social Credit Party, who rebranded to the Pro-Life Alberta Political Association in 2017.) | $500 |
| Total | | 22,792 | 98.77 | – | |
| Rejected, spoiled and declined | | 284 | 1.23 | – | |
| Turnout | | 23,076 | 66.20 | | |
| Eligible voters | | 34,857 | | | |
| United Conservative notional hold | | Swing | | -1.84 | |
Source(s) Source: Elections Alberta Note: Expenses is the sum of "Election Expenses", "Other Expenses" and "Transfers Issued". The Elections Act limits "Election Expenses" to $50,000.

=== 2015 general election ===
2015 Alberta general election: Calgary-Currie
| Party | Candidate | Votes | % | ±% |
|---|---|---|---|---|
| New Democratic | Brian Malkinson | 7,387 | 39.82% | 34.37% |
| Progressive Conservative | Christine Cusanelli | 4,577 | 24.67% | -20.29% |
| Wildrose | Terry Devries | 3,769 | 20.31% | -8.57% |
| Liberal | Shelley Wark-Martyn | 1,441 | 7.77% | -8.32% |
| Alberta Party | Tony Norman | 1,006 | 5.42% | 2.17% |
| Green | Nelson Berlin | 373 | 2.01% | 0.65% |
| Total | | 18,553 | – | – |
| Rejected, spoiled and declined | | 82 | 48 | 7 |
| Eligible electors / turnout | | 37,342 | 49.92% | -4.56% |
| New Democratic gain from Progressive Conservative | | Swing | | -0.47% |
Source(s) Source: "07 - Calgary-Currie, 2015 Alberta general election". officialresults.elections.ab.ca. Elections Alberta.

=== 2014 by-election ===
Alberta provincial by-election, October 27, 2014: Calgary-West Resignation of Ken Hughes on September 26, 2014
| Party | Candidate | Votes | % | ±% |
|---|---|---|---|---|
| Progressive Conservative | Mike Ellis | 4,836 | 44.29 | −5.56 |
| Wildrose | Sheila Taylor | 4,530 | 41.58 | +4.25 |
| Liberal | David Khan | 927 | 8.51 | +1.05 |
| New Democratic | Brian Malkinson | 337 | 3.09 | +0.08 |
| Alberta Party | Troy Millington | 264 | 2.42 | +1.45 |
| Total | | 10,894 | — | — |
| Rejected, spoiled and declined | | 17 | 7 | 1 |
| Eligible electors / turnout | | 30,541 | 35.73 | — |
| Progressive Conservative hold | | Swing | | − |
Source(s) Alberta. Chief Electoral Officer (2015). Report on the October 27, 2014 By-elections in: Calgary-Elbow, Calgary-Foothills, Calgary-West, Edmonton-Whitemud (PDF) (Report). Edmonton: Legislative Assembly of Alberta; Chief Electoral Officer. ISBN 978-098653678-6.

=== 2012 general election ===
2012 Alberta general election: Calgary-North West
| Party | Candidate | Votes | % |
|---|---|---|---|
| Progressive Conservative | Sandra Jansen | 7,683 | 51.76% |
| Wildrose | Chris Challis | 5,454 | 36.74% |
| Liberal | Robert Prcic | 992 | 6.68% |
| New Democratic | Brian Malkinson | 471 | 3.17% |
| Evergreen | Bryan Hunt | 140 | 0.94% |
| Alberta Party | Troy Millington | 103 | 0.69% |
