= Marda Loop, Calgary =

Coordinates: 51°01′26″N 114°06′47″W

Marda Loop
- Shopping district
- Location of Marda Loop in Calgary
- Country: Canada
- Province: Alberta
- City: Calgary
- First developed: 1909
- Website: visitmardaloop.com

Marda Loop is a shopping and dining district (i.e., a business improvement area, or BIA) in southwest Calgary, Alberta, Canada. While the name "Marda Loop" originated with the BIA, it also applies generically to the surrounding community and to the residential Marda Loop Communities Association. This entry is primarily about the Marda Loop BIA.

The area has become one of Calgary's most popular outdoor shopping venues. The BIA also hosts Calgary's oldest street fair, the Marda Gras Street Festival, as well as the Calgary Justice Film Festival.

The district is centered on 33rd and 34th Avenues SW between Crowchild Trail and 18th Street SW, and along Garrison Gate SW. It intersects the neighbourhoods of South Calgary, Altadore, Garrison Woods, and the southeastern part of the community of Richmond-Knob Hill.

== History ==
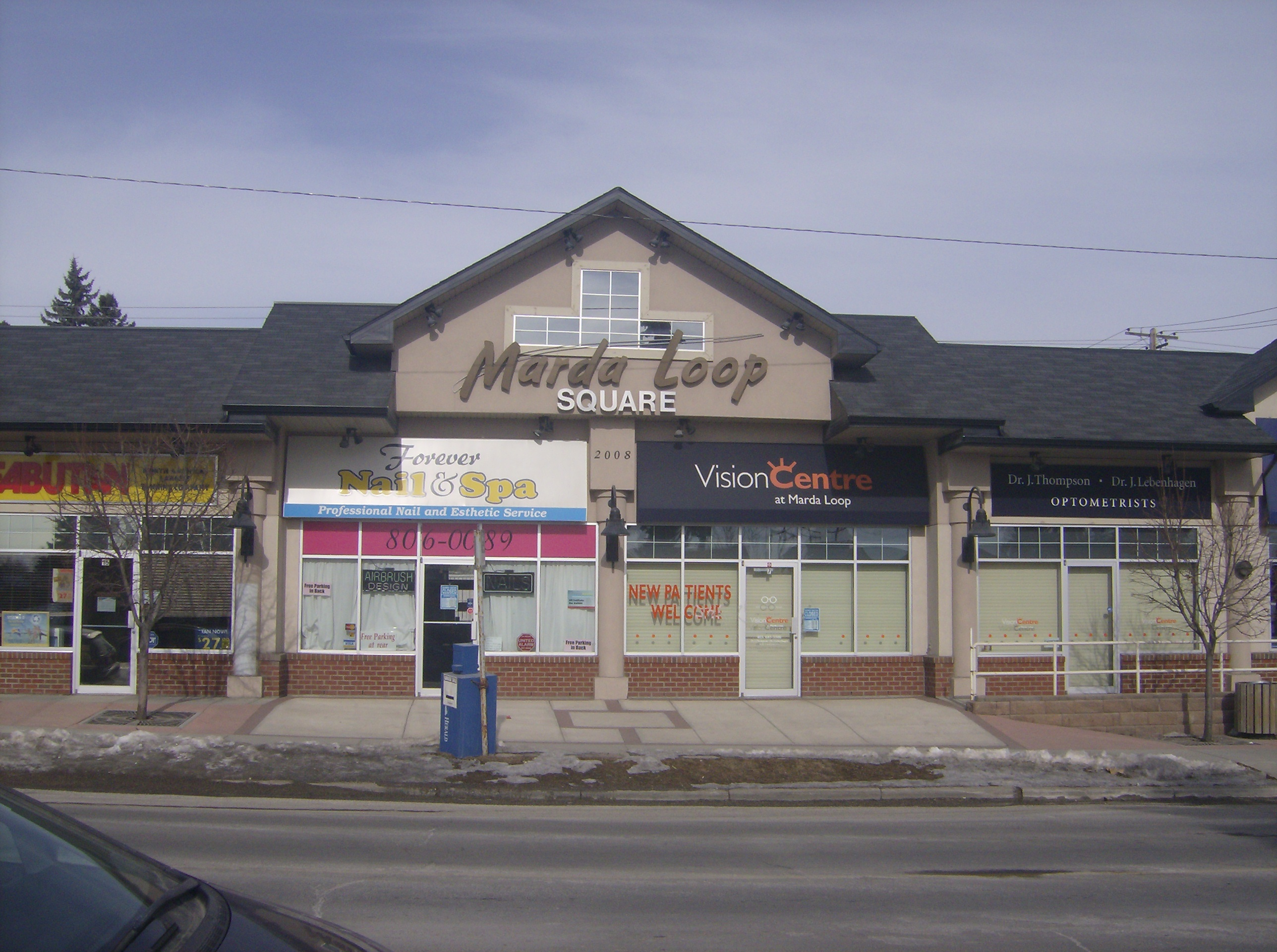
Marda Loop Square

The community dates back to 1909, where it was a streetcar (and later trolley bus) turnaround loop that went through Downtown Calgary and outlying areas, reached streetcar suburbs as far as 34th Avenue and 20th Street, and "looped" back to the downtown core.

What is now the Marda Loop Communities Association was established on September 6, 1957, to support the residents of this area and the broader South Calgary during the huge postwar growth period of the 1950s.

In 1984, the Marda Loop Business Improvement Area (BIA; then known as a business revitalization zone, or BRZ) was established, becoming one of the first BIAs in Calgary.

The area derives its current name from two significant landmarks of South Calgary, the latter part being named for the historic turnaround loop. The first half comes from the Marda Theatre (later Odeon Theatre; 1953–1988), which was founded by Mark and Mada Jenkins, who combined their names to create "Marda".

The name "Marda Loop" was chosen in a contest conducted by the BIA in 1985.

Historically, the area has always been a hub of commercial activity for that part of the city. In the late 1990s, however, the community saw a major change due to the departure of nearby Canadian Forces Base Calgary and the closure of the PMQ (Permanent Married Quarters) area.

=== Development ===
In 2004 the PMQs were redeveloped as the 161-acre Garrison Woods by Canada Lands, including a residential area with 1,600 homes and many new shops grew the Marda Loop business district. In 2010, the completion of the 6-storey Treo at Marda Loop brought the area its first mixed-use urban building, consisting of ground floor retail, one floor of offices, four floors of condos, and street retail anchored by a Shoppers Drug Mart and a café.

Starting in the 2010s, there has been a significant increase in housing density in the surrounding neighbourhoods, as older homes are giving way to new higher density condominiums leading to gentrification. Marda Loop has seen an influx of higher income households and new businesses. Evidence of the shift towards a younger and more dynamic population can be seen in new and emerging community events and facilities.

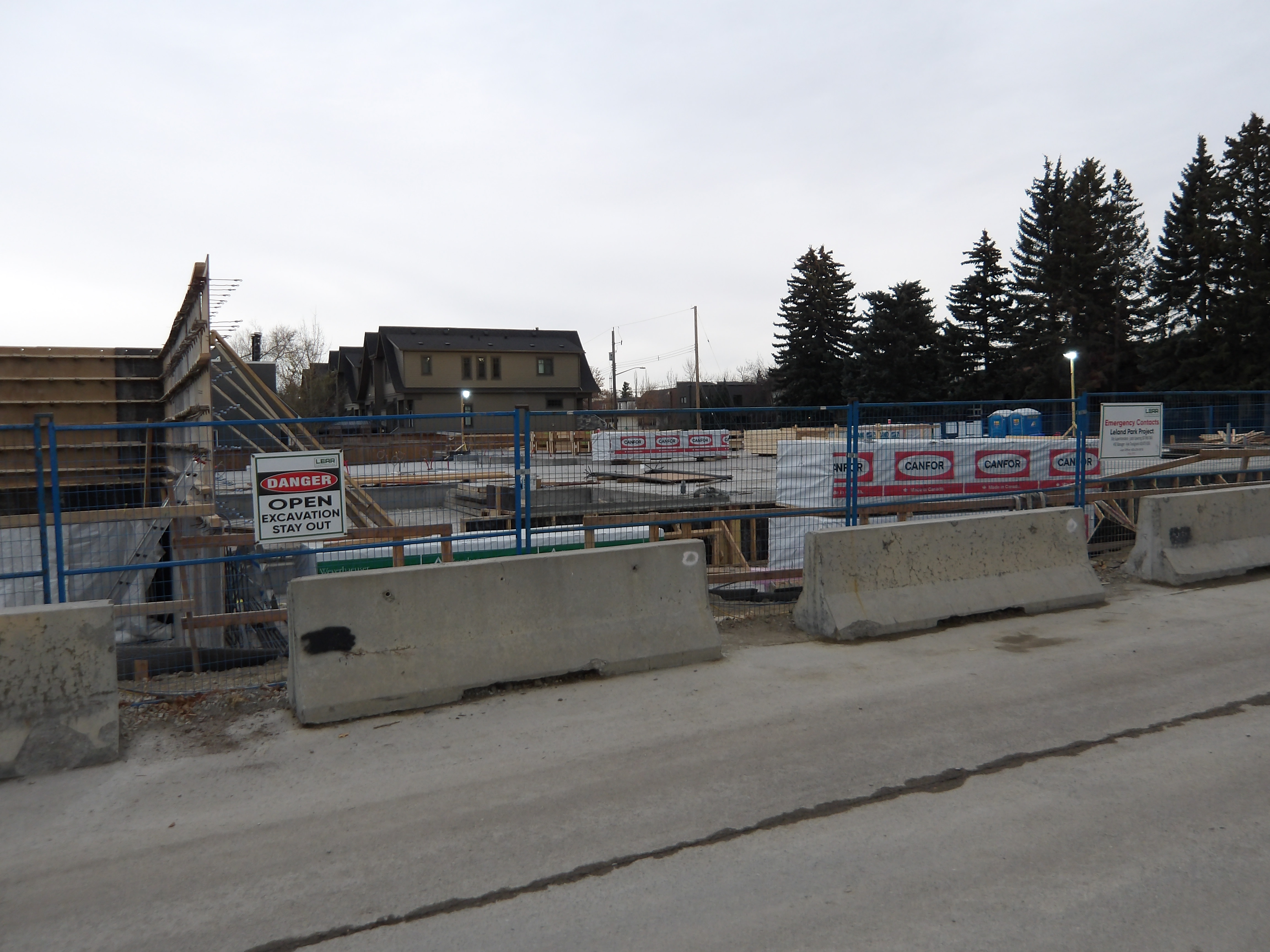
A multi-story residential development under construction in Marda Loop

The Marda Loop Main Streets Project started in 2022 and ended in October 2025. The project was affected by poor management, delays, and a lack of communication for the business owners in the area.

== Attractions ==
The area has become one of Calgary's most popular outdoor shopping venues, wherein businesses consist of small-scale retailers, coffee shops, beauty salons and pubs.

The BIA also hosts Calgary's oldest street fair, the Marda Gras Street Festival, on the second Sunday in August, as well as an annual film festival called the Calgary Justice Film Festival (formerly the Marda Loop Justice Film Festival).

== See also ==
- List of neighbourhoods in Calgary
