= Hehr =

Hehr is a surname. Notable people with the surname include:

- Addison Hehr (1909–1971), American art director
- Kent Hehr (born 1969), Canadian politician
