= Bankview, Calgary =

Bankview
- Neighbourhood
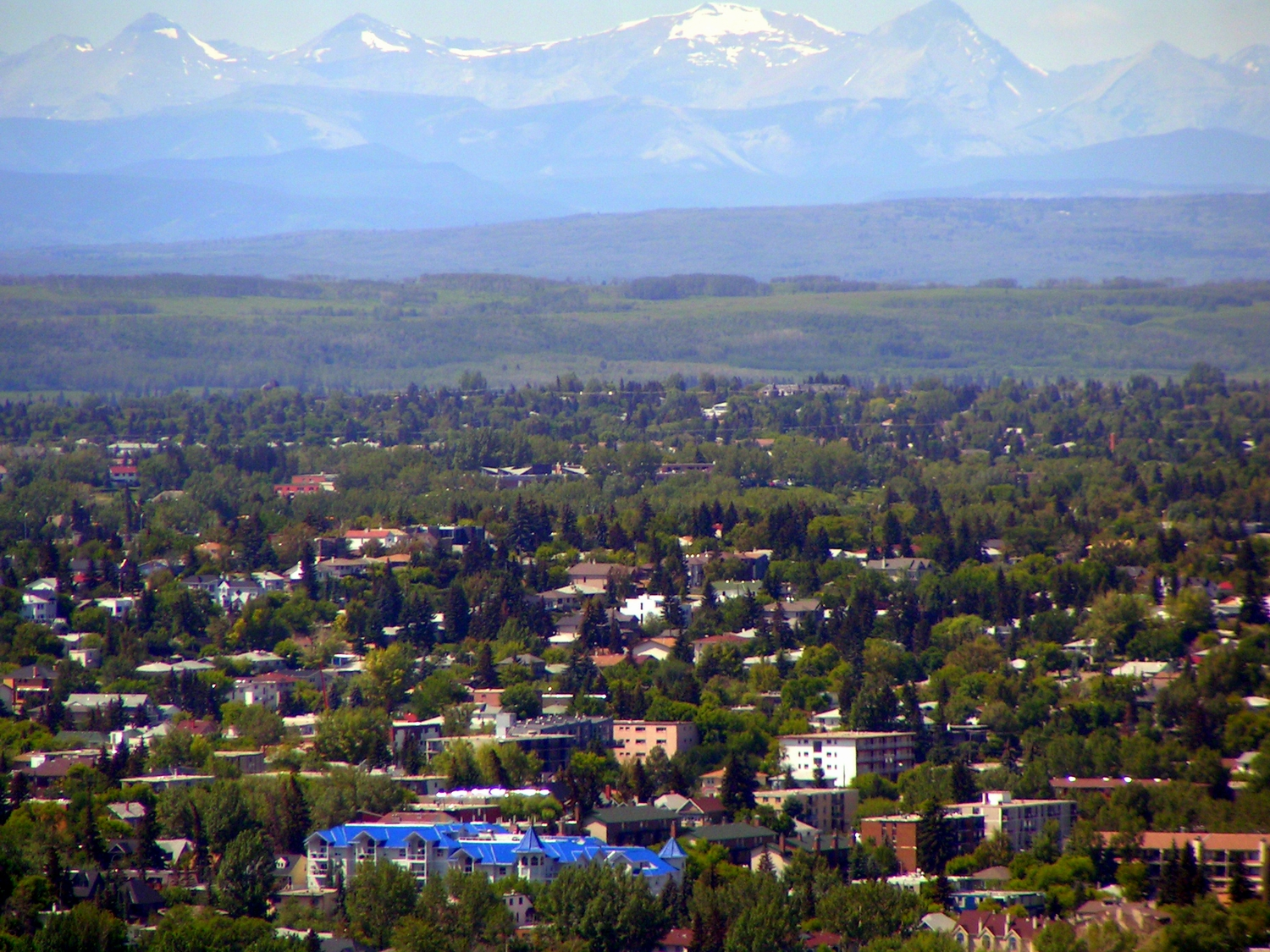
- Neighbourhood of Bankview, with Rocky Mountains in the background

- Location of Bankview in Calgary
- Coordinates: 51°02′06″N 114°05′57″W
- Country: Canada
- Province: Alberta
- City: Calgary
- Quadrant: SW
- Ward: 8
- Established: 1882
- Annexed: 1908

Government
  - Mayor: Jeromy Farkas
  - Administrative body: Calgary City Council
  - Councillor: Nathaniel Schmidt (Independent)
- Elevation: 1,075 m (3,527 ft)

Population (2006)
  - Total: 5,068
  - Average Income: $32,474
- Time zone: UTC−7 (MST)
- Postal code: T2T
- Area codes: +1-403, +1-587
- Website: Bankview Community Association

Bankview is a neighbourhood in the southwest quadrant of the city of Calgary, Alberta.

The neighbourhood is bounded by 17th Avenue SW on the north, 26th Avenue SW on the south, 14th Street SW on the east and 19th Street SW on the west. It is a residential neighbourhood located southwest of the high density Beltline district of the inner city.

== History ==
William Nimmons purchased the lands of the present day Bankview neighbourhood from the Hudson's Bay Company in 1882, for ranching and farming. He established the 3-D-Bar Ranch on these lands, and later a sandstone quarry and a theater (the Mount Royal Theatre). The Nimmons residence, built in 1884, is now a heritage building, and still stands in the northeast corner of Bankview.

By 1902, during a housing shortage due to 1900s economic boom, Nimmons divided the land, and begun selling plots to newly arrived settlers. In 1908, the remainder of the land was bought by the City of Calgary, and was divided in the traditional grid system.

Bankview was established as a neighbourhood in 1908. The district saw a major redesign in 1950, allowing for higher density apartment buildings and the community now has an area redevelopment plan in place.

== Demographics ==
In the City of Calgary's 2012 municipal census, Bankview had a population of 5,221 living in 3,528 dwellings, a 9.8% increase from its 2011 population of 4,754. With a land area of 0.7 km^{2} (0.27 sq mi), it had a population density of 7,500/km^{2} (19,300/sq mi) in 2012.

Residents in this community had a median household income of $32,474 in 2000, and there were 31.4% low income residents living in the neighbourhood. As of 2000, 18.4% of the residents were immigrants. A proportion of 85.7% of the buildings were condominiums or apartments, and 80% of the housing was used for renting.

The neighbourhood is represented in the Calgary City Council by the Ward 8 councillor, on a provincial level by Calgary Currie MLA Janet Eremenko, and at federal level by Calgary Centre MP Greg McLean.

== Crime ==
Crime Data
Year	Crime Rate (/100 pop.)
2018	6.8
2019	6.6
2020	4.3
2021	3.5
2022	3.3
2023	3.5

== Recreation ==
The Community Association operates a tennis court and maintains several playgrounds and small city parks throughout the neighbourhood.

== See also ==
- List of neighbourhoods in Calgary
