= Calgary Centre =

Federal electoral district in Alberta, Canada

Alberta electoral district
- Interactive map of riding boundaries from the 2025 federal election
- Coordinates: 51°02′25″N 114°06′06″W

Federal electoral district
- Legislature: House of Commons
MP
Greg McLean
Conservative
- District created: 1966
- First contested: 1968
- Last contested: 2025
- District webpage: profile, map

Demographics
- Population (2011): 108,931
- Electors (2019): 95,408
- Area (km²): 49
- Pop. density (per km²): 2,223.1
- Census division: Division No. 6
- Census subdivision: Calgary (part)

Calgary Centre (French: Calgary-Centre; formerly known as Calgary South Centre) is a federal electoral district in Alberta, Canada, that has been represented in the House of Commons of Canada since 1968. The riding consists of many young adults who have a relatively high average household income and education level. As the riding encompasses the downtown core and large swaths of apartment blocks in the communities west and south of downtown, Calgary Centre has a low home ownership rate compared to the rest of Canada.

== History ==
The original Calgary Centre was created in 1966 from parts of the former electoral districts of Calgary North and Calgary South. This riding was abolished in the 2003 Representation Order when parts of it went to the neighbouring electoral districts of Calgary North Centre and Calgary West and to Calgary South Centre. The latter was renamed Calgary Centre in 2004. When it was created in 2003 (as Calgary South Centre), it included 70,972 people from the abolished district of Calgary Centre, 38,889 people from Calgary West and 7,578 from Calgary Southwest.

The riding was notable at the 2000 federal election when residents elected former Prime Minister Joe Clark, representing the Progressive Conservatives, making the riding one of the few areas in Alberta that did not elect a candidate from the Canadian Alliance.

This riding lost territory to Calgary Signal Hill and gained territory from Calgary East during the 2012 electoral redistribution.

=== Historical boundaries ===
1966 representation order

1976 representation order

1987 representation order

1996 representation order

2003 representation order

2013 representation order

== Geography ==
The riding contains the neighbourhoods of Downtown Calgary, Beltline, Mission, Cliff Bungalow, Mount Royal, Elbow Park, Scarboro, Sunalta, Shaganappi, Killarney/Glengarry, Richmond, Bankview, South Calgary, Rutland Park, CFB - Currie, Lincoln Park, CFB - Lincoln Park, Altadore, North Glenmore Park, Britannia, Elboya, Windsor Park, Manchester, Bel-Aire, Mayfair, Meadowlark Park, Inglewood, Ramsay, Parkhill, Erlton, Rideau/Roxboro, Eau Claire, Chinatown, Downtown East Village

== Demographics ==
Languages (2011): 73.19% English, 4.13% Chinese, 2.09% French, 2.04% Spanish, 1.76% Tagalog, 1.21% Arabic, 1.21% Korean
Religions (2001): 32.63% Protestant, 24.52% Catholic, 2.23% Christian Orthodox, 4.88% Other Christian, 2.60% Muslim, 1.09% Jewish, 1.04% Buddhist, 30.14% No religion
Median income (2005): $30,729

Panethnic groups in Calgary Centre (2011−2021)
Panethnic group	2021		2016		2011	
Panethnic group	Pop.	%	Pop.	%	Pop.	%
European (Note: Statistic includes all persons that did not make up part of a visible minority or an indigenous identity.)	84,810	66.76%	82,985	71.85%	78,590	74.74%
East Asian (Note: Statistic includes total responses of "Chinese", "Korean", and "Japanese" under visible minority section on census.)	9,690	7.63%	9,105	7.88%	8,380	7.97%
South Asian	7,415	5.84%	5,360	4.64%	3,375	3.21%
African	6,500	5.12%	4,335	3.75%	3,505	3.33%
Southeast Asian (Note: Statistic includes total responses of "Filipino" and "Southeast Asian" under visible minority section on census.)	5,295	4.17%	4,065	3.52%	3,940	3.75%
Indigenous	4,170	3.28%	3,235	2.8%	2,580	2.45%
Middle Eastern (Note: Statistic includes total responses of "West Asian" and "Arab" under visible minority section on census.)	3,670	2.89%	2,760	2.39%	1,885	1.79%
Latin American	3,415	2.69%	2,235	1.94%	1,995	1.9%
Other (Note: Statistic includes total responses of "Visible minority, n.i.e." and "Multiple visible minorities" under visible minority section on census.)	2,065	1.63%	1,415	1.23%	915	0.87%
Total responses	127,045	97.72%	115,495	96.91%	105,150	96.53%
Total population	130,010	100%	119,176	100%	108,931	100%
Notes: Totals greater than 100% due to multiple origin responses. Demographics based on 2012 Canadian federal electoral redistribution riding boundaries.

== Members of Parliament ==
This riding has elected the following members of the House of Commons of Canada:

Parliament	Years	Member	Party
Calgary Centre; Riding created from Calgary North and Calgary South
28th	1968–1972	Douglas Harkness	Progressive Conservative
29th	1972–1974	Harvie Andre	Progressive Conservative
30th	1974–1979	Harvie Andre	Progressive Conservative
31st	1979–1980	Harvie Andre	Progressive Conservative
32nd	1980–1984	Harvie Andre	Progressive Conservative
33rd	1984–1988	Harvie Andre	Progressive Conservative
34th	1988–1993	Harvie Andre	Progressive Conservative
35th	1993–1997	Jim Silye	Reform
36th	1997–2000 (Note: The Reform Party merged with the Canadian Alliance Party on 27 March 2000.)	Eric Lowther	Reform
36th	2000–2000	Eric Lowther	Alliance
37th	2000–2003 (Note: Joe Clark did not join with other Progressive Conservatives in the merger with the Canadian Alliance to form the Conservative Party on 8 December 2003.)	Joe Clark	Progressive Conservative
37th	2003–2004	Joe Clark	Independent
38th	2004–2006	Lee Richardson	Conservative
39th	2006–2008	Lee Richardson	Conservative
40th	2008–2011	Lee Richardson	Conservative
41st	2011–2012 (Note: Lee Richardson resigned as MP on 30 May 2012 to accept an appointment as Principal Secretary to the Premier of Alberta. His successor was elected in a by-election on 26 November 2012.)	Lee Richardson	Conservative
41st	2012–2015	Joan Crockatt	Conservative
42nd	2015–2019	Kent Hehr	Liberal
43rd	2019–2021	Greg McLean	Conservative
44th	2021–2025	Greg McLean	Conservative
45th	2025–present	Greg McLean	Conservative

=== Current member of Parliament ===
This seat is held by Greg McLean. McLean, a member of the Conservative Party of Canada, was first elected in the 2019 federal election.

== Election results ==
View source data.
Graph of election results in Calgary (South) Centre (minor parties that never got 2% of the vote or didn't run consistently are omitted)

=== Calgary Centre, 2006–present ===
2025 Canadian federal election
Party	Candidate	Votes	%	±%	Expenditures
Conservative	Greg McLean	31,604	50.21	–0.71	$92,755.44
Liberal	Lindsay Luhnau	28,824	45.79	+15.73	$105,155.31
New Democratic	Beau Shaw	1,665	2.65	–13.77	$12,670.74
People's	Robert Hawley	365	0.58	–	none listed
Green	Jayden Baldonado	362	0.58	–1.05	none listed
Neo Rhino	Scott Fea	126	0.20	–	none listed
Total valid votes/expense limit		62,946	99.39	–	$136,676.30
Total rejected ballots		387	0.61	–0.24	
Turnout		63,333	68.61	+5.88	
Eligible voters		92,309			
Conservative notional hold		Swing		–8.59	
Source: Elections Canada

2021 federal election redistributed results
Party	Vote	%
Conservative	27,761	50.92
Liberal	16,391	30.06
New Democratic	8,955	16.42
Green	887	1.63
Others	527	0.97

2021 Canadian federal election
Party	Candidate	Votes	%	±%	Expenditures
Conservative	Greg McLean	30,375	51.30	–5.34	$66,265.71
Liberal	Sabrina Grover	17,593	29.71	+2.73	$71,053.48
New Democratic	Juan Estevez Moreno	9,694	16.37	+6.48	$3,174.97
Green	Austin Mullins	971	1.64	–2.69	$415.62
Christian Heritage	Dawid Pawlowski	575	0.97	+0.78	$4,650.00
Total valid votes/expense limit		59,208	99.15	–	$122,167.91
Total rejected ballots		509	0.85	+0.27	
Turnout		59,717	62.73	–5.47	
Eligible voters		95,190			
Conservative hold		Swing		–4.04	
Source: Elections Canada

2019 Canadian federal election
Party	Candidate	Votes	%	±%	Expenditures
Conservative	Greg McLean	37,306	56.64	+11.34	$105,315.36
Liberal	Kent Hehr	17,771	26.98	–19.54	$114,751.64
New Democratic	Jessica Buresi	6,516	9.89	+4.32	$832.79
Green	Thana Boonlert	2,853	4.33	+2.13	$7,973.82
People's	Chevy Johnston	907	1.38	–	$13,514.03
Animal Protection	Eden Gould	247	0.38	–	$1,717.18
Independent	Michael Pewtress	138	0.21	–	$1,189.15
Christian Heritage	Dawid Pawlowski	126	0.19	–	$4,427.07
Total valid votes/expense limit		65,864	99.42	–	$119,599.33
Total rejected ballots		385	0.58	+0.21	
Turnout		66,249	68.21	–1.89	
Eligible voters		97,129			
Conservative gain from Liberal		Swing		+15.44	
Source: Elections Canada

2015 Canadian federal election
Party	Candidate	Votes	%	±%	Expenditures
Liberal	Kent Hehr	28,496	46.52	+27.40	$190,509.57
Conservative	Joan Crockatt	27,746	45.30	–10.07	$157,845.73
New Democratic	Jillian Ratti	3,412	5.57	–9.59	$19,466.71
Green	Thana Boonlert	1,347	2.20	–8.13	$3,584.84
Independent	Yogi Henderson	248	0.40	–	$1,203.28
Total valid votes/expense limit		61,249	99.63	–	$222,181.20
Total rejected ballots		227	0.37	+0.04	
Turnout		61,476	70.10	+40.78	
Eligible voters		87,697			
Liberal gain from Conservative		Swing		+18.73	
Source: Elections Canada

2011 federal election redistributed results
Party	Vote	%
Conservative	22,949	55.37
Liberal	7,926	19.12
New Democratic	6,285	15.16
Green	4,282	10.33
Others	8	0.02

Canadian federal by-election, November 26, 2012 Resignation of Lee Richardson
Party	Candidate	Votes	%	±%	Expenditures
Conservative	Joan Crockatt	10,191	36.87	–20.81	$95,251
Liberal	Harvey Locke	9,033	32.68	+15.15	$97,025
Green	Chris Turner	7,090	25.65	+15.72	$100,180
New Democratic	Dan Meades	1,064	3.85	–11.01	$90,148
Independent	Antony Tony Grochowski	141	0.51	–	none listed
Libertarian	Tony Prashad	121	0.44	–	$255
Total valid votes/expense limit		27,640	99.67	–	$102,128.86
Total rejected ballots		92	0.33	–0.20	
Turnout		27,732	29.32	–25.96	
Eligible voters		94,582			
Conservative hold		Swing		–35.96	
Source: Elections Canada

2011 Canadian federal election
Party	Candidate	Votes	%	±%	Expenditures
Conservative	Lee Richardson	28,401	57.68	+2.08	$80,024.11
Liberal	Jennifer Pollock	8,631	17.53	–0.38	$51,736.72
New Democratic	Donna Marlis Montgomery	7,314	14.86	+5.85	none listed
Green	William Hamilton	4,889	9.93	–6.65	$30,244.10
Total valid votes/expense limit		49,235	99.47	–	$93,844.88
Total rejected ballots		261	0.53	+0.04	
Turnout		49,496	55.28	+2.12	
Eligible voters		89,536			
Conservative hold		Swing		+1.23	
Source: Elections Canada

2008 Canadian federal election
Party	Candidate	Votes	%	±%	Expenditures
Conservative	Lee Richardson	26,085	55.60	+0.19	$72,164.70
Liberal	Heesung Kim	8,402	17.91	–1.28	$34,351.42
Green	Natalie Odd	7,778	16.58	+4.89	$28,381.24
New Democratic	Tyler Kinch	4,229	9.01	–4.24	$9,881.23
Independent	Antony Tony Grochowski	420	0.90	–	none listed
Total valid votes/expense limit		46,914	99.52	–	$90,676.99
Total rejected ballots		228	0.48	–0.02	
Turnout		47,142	53.16	–8.86	
Eligible voters		88,677			
Conservative hold		Swing		+0.74	
Source: Elections Canada

2006 Canadian federal election
Party	Candidate	Votes	%	±%	Expenditures
Conservative	Lee Richardson	30,213	55.41	+4.26	$76,319.07
Liberal	Heesung Kim	10,464	19.19	–10.70	$36,321.50
New Democratic	Brian Pincott	7,227	13.25	+4.76	$8,598.09
Green	John N. Johnson	6,372	11.69	+1.76	$3,894.19
Canadian Action	Trevor Grover	250	0.46	–0.08	none listed
Total valid votes/expense limit		54,526	99.50	–	$87,076.98
Total rejected ballots		274	0.50	+0.11	
Turnout		54,800	62.02	+4.48	
Eligible voters		88,354			
Conservative hold		Swing		+7.5	
Source: Elections Canada

=== Calgary South Centre, 2004–2005 ===
2004 Canadian federal election
Party	Candidate	Votes	%	±%	Expenditures
Conservative	Lee Richardson	26,192	51.15	-33.42	$78,167
Liberal	Julia Turnbull	15,305	29.89	+20.06	$71,037
Green	Phillip K. Liesemer	5,080	9.92	+7.88	$1,898
New Democratic	Keith Purdy	4,350	8.49	+5.69	$4,667
Canadian Action	Trevor Grover	274	0.53	*	n/a
Total valid votes		51,201	100.00	6,041	–
Total rejected ballots		202	0.39	+0.02	
Turnout		51,403	57.54	+0.76	
Conservative hold		Swing		-23.21	

Results based on redistributed results. Conservative Party change is compared to a combination of Progressive Conservative Party and Canadian Alliance totals.

=== Calgary Centre, 1966–2003 ===
2000 Canadian federal election
Party	Candidate	Votes	%	±%	Expenditures
Progressive Conservative	Joe Clark	26,358	46.05	+27.49	$67,789
Alliance	Eric Lowther	22,054	38.53	–1.55	$72,436
Liberal	Joanne Levy	5,630	9.84	–22.79	$45,827
New Democratic	Don LePan	1,604	2.80	–3.25	$1,780
Green	Michael Alvarez-Toye	1,170	2.04	+0.24	$1,062
Independent	Beverley Smith	293	0.51	–	$5,223
Marxist–Leninist	Margaret Peggy Askin	133	0.23	–0.11	$284
Total valid votes		57,242	99.63		
Total rejected ballots		213	0.37	–0.04	
Turnout		57,455	56.78	–1.12	
Eligible voters		101,181			
Progressive Conservative gain from Reform		Swing		–14.5	
Source: Elections Canada

1997 Canadian federal election
Party	Candidate	Votes	%	±%	Expenditures
Reform	Eric Lowther	19,936	40.08	–5.00	$66,910
Liberal	Bev Longstaff	16,231	32.63	+2.40	$64,840
Progressive Conservative	Rob Gray	9,230	18.56	+3.67	$59,080
New Democratic	Duncan Green	3,011	6.05	+1.76	$8,377
Green	Andrea Welling	893	1.80	+0.83	$173
Natural Law	Roni Shapka	273	0.55	–0.16	none listed
Marxist–Leninist	Margaret Peggy Askin	167	0.34	+0.16	$767
Total valid votes		49,741	99.59		
Total rejected ballots		206	0.41	+0.05	
Turnout		49,947	57.90	–0.03	
Eligible voters		86,259			
Reform hold		Swing		–3.70	
Source: Elections Canada

1993 Canadian federal election
Party	Candidate	Votes	%	±%
Reform	Jim Silye	22,600	45.08	+32.65
Liberal	S. Robert Blair	15,157	30.23	+18.51
Progressive Conservative	Sean O'Neil	7,466	14.89	–38.83
New Democratic	Cathie McCreary	2,149	4.29	–15.73
National	Peter Hoff	1,743	3.48	–
Green	Rebecca Matiowsky	484	0.97	–0.28
Natural Law	Annie Anderson	355	0.71	–
Canada Party	Bruce Jackman	92	0.18	–
Marxist–Leninist	Margaret Peggy Askin	91	0.18	–
Total valid votes		50,137	99.64	
Total rejected ballots		182	0.36	–0.10
Turnout		50,319	57.94	–14.54
Eligible voters		86,851		
Reform gain from Progressive Conservative		Swing		+25.58
Source: Elections Canada

1988 Canadian federal election
Party	Candidate	Votes	%	±%
Progressive Conservative	Harvie Andre	28,794	53.72	–12.63
New Democratic	Elaine Husband	10,731	20.02	+6.34
Reform	John A. Hamilton	6,662	12.43	–
Liberal	Bob Robinson	6,280	11.72	–4.13
Green	Norman Conrad	670	1.25	–0.78
Libertarian	John Gordon King	358	0.67	+0.19
Independent	Margaret Peggy Askin	107	0.20	–
Total valid votes		53,602	99.54	
Total rejected ballots		250	0.46	+0.02
Turnout		53,852	72.48	+3.75
Eligible voters		74,301		
Progressive Conservative hold		Swing		–9.49
Source: Elections Canada

1984 Canadian federal election
Party	Candidate	Votes	%	±%
Progressive Conservative	Harvie Andre	24,924	66.35	+8.96
Liberal	Karen Gainer	5,955	15.85	–14.06
New Democratic	Susan Keeley	5,138	13.68	+4.45
Green	Glen Staples	761	2.03	–
Confederation of Regions	Jean Ferguson	604	1.61	–
Libertarian	Joseph Kyriakakis	180	0.48	–
Total valid votes		37,562	99.56	
Total rejected ballots		166	0.44	+0.10
Turnout		37,728	68.73	+14.79
Eligible voters		54,892		
Progressive Conservative hold		Swing		+11.51
Source: Elections Canada

1980 Canadian federal election
Party	Candidate	Votes	%	±%
Progressive Conservative	Harvie Andre	18,610	57.39	–1.71
Liberal	George Ho Lem	9,698	29.91	+1.72
New Democratic	David Jones	2,994	9.23	–1.71
Rhinoceros	Willy Samoil	766	2.36	–
Social Credit	Tom Erhart	257	0.79	–0.60
Communist	Casey Swann	58	0.18	–0.02
Marxist–Leninist	Julie Northrup	43	0.13	–0.05
Total valid votes		32,426	99.66	
Total rejected ballots		110	0.34	–0.00
Turnout		32,536	53.94	–12.63
Eligible voters		60,318		
Progressive Conservative hold		Swing		–1.72
Source: Elections Canada

1979 Canadian federal election
Party	Candidate	Votes	%	±%
Progressive Conservative	Harvie Andre	22,124	59.10	–4.05
Liberal	Frances Wright	10,555	28.19	+1.90
New Democratic	Bohdan Harasymiw	4,095	10.94	+2.79
Social Credit	Tom Erhart	522	1.39	–0.32
Communist	Casey Swann	74	0.20	–0.25
Marxist–Leninist	Julie Northrup	66	0.18	–0.06
Total valid votes		37,436	99.66	
Total rejected ballots		128	0.34	–0.01
Turnout		37,564	66.57	–0.03
Eligible voters		56,426		
Progressive Conservative hold		Swing		–2.98
Source: Elections Canada

1974 Canadian federal election
Party	Candidate	Votes	%	±%
Progressive Conservative	Harvie Andre	23,810	63.15	+9.85
Liberal	Frances Wright	9,912	26.29	–4.53
New Democratic	George McGuire	3,072	8.15	–4.87
Social Credit	Clifford Menzies Willmott	646	1.71	–0.83
Communist	David G. Whitefield	170	0.45	–
Marxist–Leninist	Dean Magel	91	0.24	–
Total valid votes		37,701	99.65	
Total rejected ballots		133	0.35	–1.35
Turnout		37,834	66.61	–8.79
Eligible voters		56,802		
Progressive Conservative hold		Swing		+7.19
Source: Elections Canada

1972 Canadian federal election
Party	Candidate	Votes	%	±%
Progressive Conservative	Harvie Andre	22,669	53.30	+6.23
Liberal	Nicholas Taylor	13,110	30.82	–15.42
New Democratic	David Jones	5,538	13.02	+6.33
Social Credit	Clifford Menzies Willmott	1,081	2.54	–
Independent	Frank F. Cottingham	80	0.19	–
Independent	Colin Constant	53	0.12	–
Total valid votes		42,531	98.30	
Total rejected ballots		737	1.70	+1.05
Turnout		43,268	75.39	+3.94
Eligible voters		57,389		
Progressive Conservative hold		Swing		+10.83
Source: Elections Canada

1968 Canadian federal election
Party	Candidate	Votes	%	±%
Progressive Conservative	Douglas Harkness	16,977	47.07	–
Liberal	Nicholas Taylor	16,676	46.24	–
New Democratic	Margaret I. Jackson	2,413	6.69	–
Total valid votes		36,066	99.34	
Total rejected ballots		239	0.66	–
Turnout		36,305	71.46	–
Eligible voters		50,808		
Progressive Conservative gain		Swing		–
Source: Elections Canada

== See also ==
- List of Canadian electoral districts
- Historical federal electoral districts of Canada
