= Greg McLean =

Greg McLean may refer to:

- Greg McLean (filmmaker), Australian film director, producer and writer
- Greg McLean (politician), Canadian politician
