= Richmond, Calgary =

Richmond
- Neighbourhood
- Location of Richmond in Calgary
- Coordinates: 51°01′53″N 114°06′48″W
- Country: Canada
- Province: Alberta
- City: Calgary
- Quadrant: SW
- Ward: 8
- Established: 1950
- Annexed: 1907

Government
  - Mayor: Jeromy Farkas
  - Administrative body: Calgary City Council
  - Councillor: Nathaniel Schmidt (Independent)

Area
  - Total: 1.6 km^{2} (0.62 sq mi)
- Elevation: 1,105 m (3,625 ft)

Population (2008)
  - Total: 3,892
  - Average Income: $49,954
- Website: Richmond Community Association

Richmond is a residential neighbourhood in the southwest quadrant of Calgary, Alberta.

It is located on both sides of the Crowchild Trail, south of 17th Avenue SW. It was the location of Alberta Children's Hospital until 2007, when the new facility was opened in the northwest quadrant. The community has an area redevelopment plan in place.

Richmond was established in 1950. It is represented in the Calgary City Council by the Ward 8 councillor, on a provincial level by Calgary-Currie MLA Brian Malkinson, and is currently represented at the federal level by Calgary Centre MP Kent Hehr.

== Demographics ==
In the City of Calgary's 2012 municipal census, Richmond had a population of 4,229 living in 2,259 dwellings, a 2.8% increase from its 2011 population of 4,113. With a land area of 1.8 km^{2} (0.69 sq mi), it had a population density of 2,350/km^{2} (6,090/sq mi) in 2012.

Residents in this community had a median household income of $49,954, and there were 17.6% low income residents living in the neighbourhood. Most buildings are single-family detached home (48.3%).

== Crime ==
Year	Crime Rate (/100 pop.)
2018	3.3
2019	3.8
2020	4.1
2021	2.7
2022	3.1
2023	2.6

== Education ==
The community is served by Richmond Elementary and Chinook College for Continuing Education public schools, as well as various private schools.

== See also ==
- List of neighbourhoods in Calgary
