= Jim Silye =

Canadian politician

No. 28, 33
- Position: Defensive back

Personal information
- Born: April 28, 1946 (age 80); Vöcklabruck, Austria

Career information
- College: University of Ottawa

Career history
- 1969–75: Calgary Stampeders

Awards and highlights
- 1971 Grey Cup Champion; CFL single-season record for punt returns in a season (123)

Other information

Member of Parliament for Calgary Centre
- In office October 25, 1993 – June 1, 1997
- Preceded by: Harvie Andre
- Succeeded by: Eric Lowther

Personal details
- Party: Reform

Jim Silye (born April 28, 1946) is a Canadian politician, businessman, and former professional football player for the Canadian Football League.

Born in Vöcklabruck, Austria, he emigrated to Arnprior, Ontario in 1951. He received a Bachelor of Arts degree from the University of Ottawa in 1969. He played on the Calgary Stampeders from 1969 to 1975, wearing numbers 28 and 33. He holds the CFL record for most punt returns in a season with 123. He was part of the 1971 Grey Cup-winning team.

In the 1993 Canadian federal election, he was elected as the Reform Party candidate in the Alberta riding of Calgary Centre with 22,276 votes, representing 44.76% of ballots cast and a margin of 7,119 votes over his nearest rival. In the House of Commons, Silye served as the Reform Party Whip (styled as "Caucus Coordinator") from 1994 to 1995, and in the party's shadow cabinet as National Revenue Critic from 1995 to 1997 and Human Resources Development Critic from February to June 1997. He sat on the Standing Committee on Public Accounts and the Standing Committee on Procedure and House Affairs for both sessions of the 35th Parilament; in the 1st session (1994-1996), he also sat on the Standing Committee on Finance, and in the 2nd session (1996-1997) Silye sat on the Standing Committee on Human Resources Development.

Silye served one term and did not seek re-election in the 1997 election. He ran as a Progressive Conservative in the 2000 election in the riding of Calgary West, where he came second to incumbent MP Rob Anders of the Canadian Alliance, the successor party to Reform. In 2004, he ran in the Alberta Senate nominee election for a place in the Senate of Canada. He finished in fifth place, and was not put on the list of proposed Alberta senators.

From 2010 to 2019, Silye served as the Vice-Chairperson of the Board of Trustees of the National Museum of Science and Technology of Canada.

He is the president and CEO of Eagle Rock Exploration Limited, an oil and gas exploration company based in Calgary, Alberta.

== Notes ==
- Jim Silye – Parliament of Canada biography

"CALGARY STAMPEDERS BY THE NUMBERS". CALGARY STAMPEDER. Archived from the original on 5 February 2005.
