= Altadore, Calgary =

Altadore
- Neighbourhood
- Location of Altadore in Calgary
- Coordinates: 51°01′05″N 114°06′02″W
- Country: Canada
- Province: Alberta
- City: Calgary
- Quadrant: SW
- Ward: 8
- Established: 1945

Government
  - Mayor: Jeromy Farkas
  - Administrative body: Calgary City Council
  - Councillor: Nathaniel Schmidt (Independent)
- Elevation: 1,095 m (3,593 ft)

Population (2021)
  - Total: 7,290
  - Average Income: $71,000
- Postal code: T3E, T2T
- Website: Marda Loop Community Association

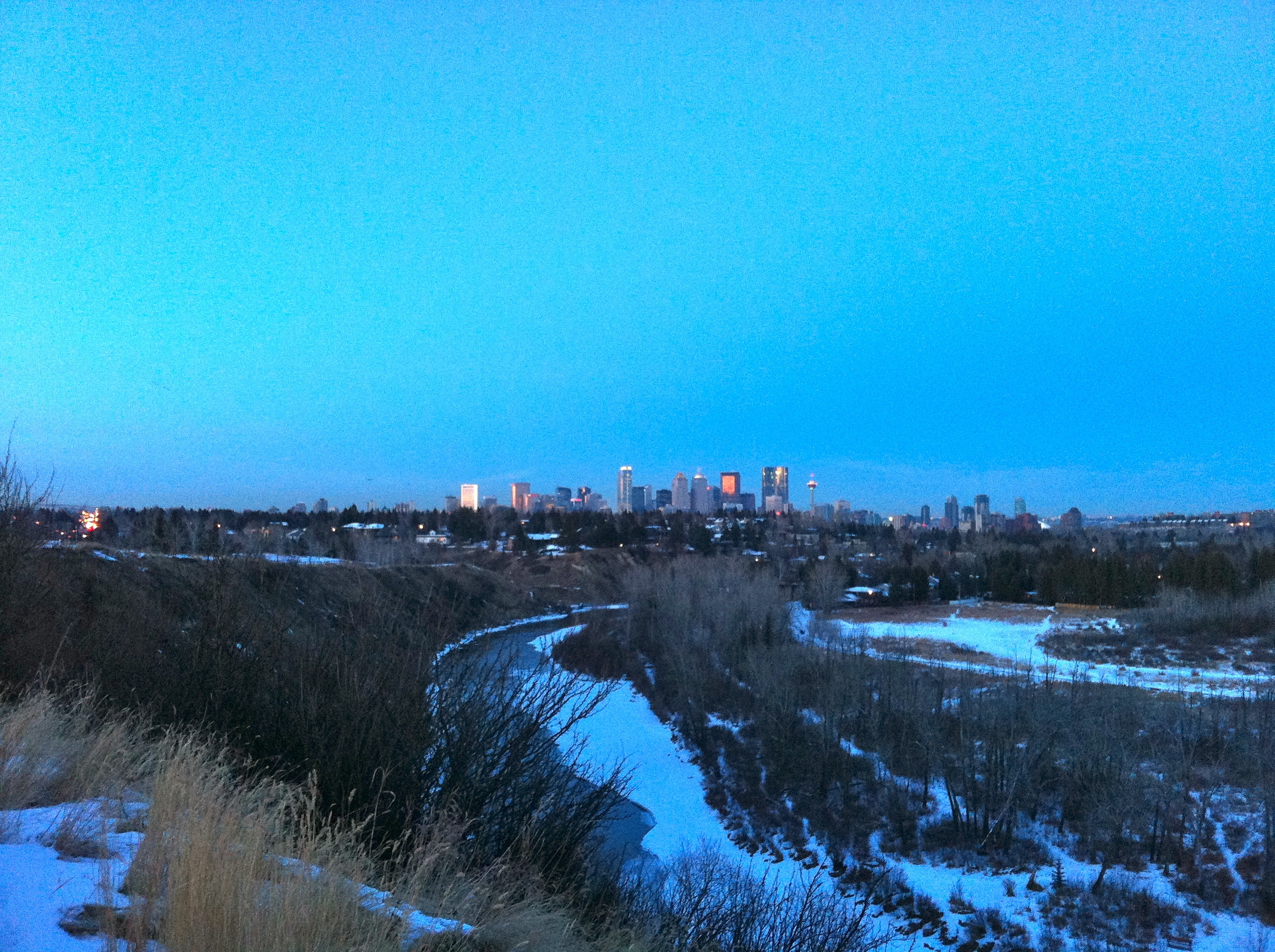
View of downtown from the Altadore area

Altadore is a residential neighbourhood in the inner-city portion of the southwest quadrant of Calgary, Alberta. It is bounded by 33rd Ave SW and the neighbourhood of South Calgary in the north, River Park and 14 St SW in the east, the Garrison Woods neighbourhood and Crowchild Trail SW in the west, and 50th Ave SW in the south. Altadore is part of the Marda Loop Communities Association (MLCA) along with Garrison Woods and South Calgary.

Altadore was named one of Calgary's best neighbourhoods in 2010 for its proximity to River Park, one of Calgary's best parks on the Elbow River, Marda Loop, the largest and busiest outdoor shopping area in Calgary, and for having a vibrant party and cultural scene. The Marda Loop Business Revitalization Zone is located within the community, along 33 and 34 Avenues SW. The neighbourhood is experiencing a gentrification process with many high-end, semi-detached homes built in the last 15 years.

Altadore was established in 1945. It is represented in the Calgary City Council by the Ward 8 councillor. The community has an area redevelopment plan in place.

The meaning of "Altadore" is unclear. It may have been named after a mansion in County Wicklow, Ireland, or it may have been a portmanteau word whose first part derived either from "Alta", the standard English abbreviation of Alberta, or "alta" for high (the neighbourhood being on a hill), and whose second part was derived from "dore", a version of the French "d'or", or "of gold".

== Demographics ==
In the City of Calgary's 2018 municipal census, Altadore (not including Garrison Woods, which had previously been included in the Altadore census area) had a population of 6,831 living in 3,218 dwellings. Including Garrison Woods, with a land area of 2.9 km^{2} (1.1 sq mi), it had a population density of 3,140/km^{2} (8,140/sq mi) in 2012.

Altadore neighbourhood demographics from the 2018 municipal census document:

- median personal income of $63,281 (2015),
- median household income of $130,638 (2015),
- 7% of residents are low income,
- 13% of residents are immigrants.
- 29% of dwellings are rentals,
- 38% of dwellings are detached, 30% semi-detached/duplex, 9% row housing, and 23% apartments.

== Education ==
Altadore contains two schools operated by the Calgary Board of Education. Altadore Elementary, on 16th Street S.W., serves students from kindergarten to grade six and was opened in 1952. Dr. Oakley School, on 20th Street S.W., serves students with learning disabilities from grades three to nine. Dr. Oakley School was once an elementary and junior high school, but was re-purposed in the early 1980s due to low attendance.

The designated public junior high school is Mount Royal Junior High in the Mount Royal neighbourhood, and the designated public senior high school is Central Memorial High School located in the North Glenmore Park neighbourhood.

The designated public French Immersion elementary school is William Reid School in the Elbow Park neighbourhood, the designated public French Immersion junior high school is Elboya School, and the designated public French Immersion high school is Western Canada High School.

There are no schools operated by the Calgary Catholic School District located in Altadore. Separate school students attend St. James Elementary and Junior High School and Bishop Carroll High School.

There are also a number of private schools in Altadore, including the French Lycée Louis Pasteur, and Rundle Academy. The community was also once the home of I.L. Peretz School, a Jewish elementary school operated under the aegis of the Board of Education; after the school moved, the building eventually became the home of the Calgary Waldorf School before it was demolished in 2004 and replaced by a condominium complex.

== See also ==
- List of neighbourhoods in Calgary
