= Joan Crockatt =

Canadian politician (born 1955)

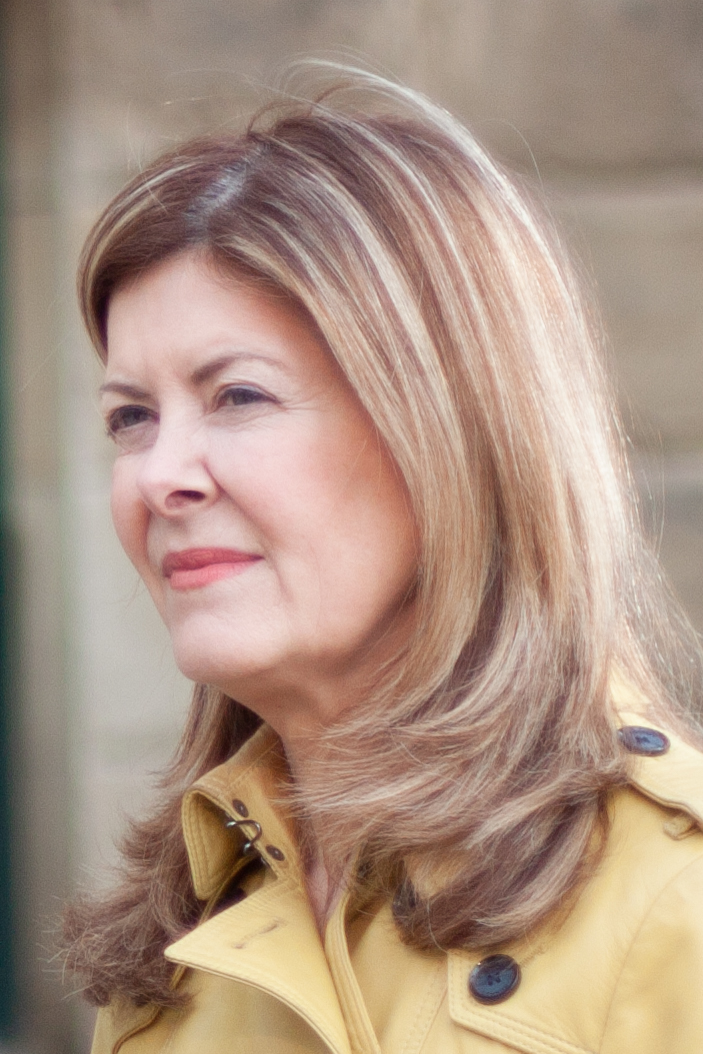

Member of Parliament for Calgary Centre
- In office November 26, 2012 – October 19, 2015
- Preceded by: Lee Richardson
- Succeeded by: Kent Hehr

Personal details
- Born: December 5, 1955 (age 70) Lloydminster, Alberta, Canada
- Party: Conservative
- Profession: Journalist

Joan Crockatt (born December 5, 1955) is a Canadian politician, who was elected to the House of Commons of Canada in a by-election on November 26, 2012. A member of the Conservative Party of Canada, she represented the electoral district of Calgary Centre until November 2015.

From Alberta, Crockatt is a business journalist who worked most notably as a senior newspaper executive with the Calgary Herald, and later as a communications consultant and national public affairs commentator.

== Personal life ==
Crockatt was born and raised in Lloydminster and has called Calgary home for more than 18 years. She earned a Bachelor of Arts degree from the University of Saskatchewan and was awarded a Southam Fellowship in Journalism at the University of Toronto. She studied strategic thinking at the London School of Economics.

Crockatt has been an active community volunteer, chairing the Alberta College of Art and Design's major fundraiser for student scholarships, being a founder of the Lloydminster Sexual Assault Centre, serving as a mentor for the Famous Five Foundation, and competing as a competitive synchronized figure skater (1993 Canadian Silver Medal, 2003 Canadian Festival Silver Medal).

== Journalism ==
Crockatt has worked as director of editorial for CanWest Global Communications, and managing editor and editorialist for the Calgary Herald. For the past decade, before election to parliament, she has been a communications consultant, working for clients including the Calgary Stampede, corporations and non-profits. During her time as the Calgary Herald's managing editor, the newspaper's journalists went on a union drive and then a prolonged strike in 1999.

In her career in journalism, much of Crockatt's work focused on politics. She has appeared as a political commentator on CBC News Network and Sun News Network.

== Politics ==
In November 2012, Crockatt won a by-election against Liberal candidate Harvey Locke and Green candidate Chris Turner, focusing her campaign on door-knocking and personal interactions with constituents. However, she won with only 37 percent of the vote, the worst showing for a centre-right candidate in the riding in decades and the closest that a centre-left candidate had come in recent memory to winning a Calgary seat.

She served on the House of Commons Standing Committees for Natural Resources and the Status of Women. As part of the Standing Committee on the Status of Women, Crockatt has participated in numerous studies that promote equality for women and their full participation in the economic, social and democratic life of Canada.

Since being elected she has been a featured speaker at the 2013 annual Manning Conference in Ottawa, where she took part in a panel to discuss issues of gender and politics. She has been named one of the top 10 Alberta politicians in the use of social media.

in the 2015 federal election on October 19, former Liberal MLA Kent Hehr defeated Crockatt, gaining one of two seats for the Liberals in Calgary.

== 2013 Alberta floods ==
Following the 2013 Alberta floods, Crockatt has become a strong advocate for those affected and continues to push for flood mitigation, leading to $2.8 billion being set aside for 2013 Alberta flood recovery, including the $200 million National Disaster Mitigation Program in the 2014 federal budget, and eligibility for disaster mitigation infrastructure projects under the New Building Canada Fund, of which Alberta will see $3.2 billion over the next 10 years.

Crockatt also joined the Honourable Leona Aglukkaq, Minister of the Environment, in announcing a $135 million investment that will allow Environment Canada to make significant upgrades to the monitoring networks and to the weather warning and forecast systems, as to better predict events like the 2013 Alberta floods.

== Electoral record ==
2015 Canadian federal election: Calgary Centre
Party	Candidate	Votes	%	±%	Expenditures - Calgary Centre
Liberal	Kent Hehr	28,496	46.52	+27.40	–
Conservative	Joan Crockatt	27,746	45.30	-10.07	–
New Democratic	Jillian Ratti	3,412	5.57	-9.59	–
Green	Thana Boonlert	1,347	2.20	-8.13	–
Independent	Yogi Henderson	248	0.39		–
Total valid votes/Expense limit		61,249	100.00		$221,059.99
Total rejected ballots		227	0.37	–	
Turnout		61,476	72.36	–	
Eligible voters		84,960			
Liberal gain from Conservative		Swing		+18.73	
Source: Elections Canada

Canadian federal by-election, November 26, 2012: Calgary Centre Resignation of Lee Richardson
Party	Candidate	Votes	%	±%	Expenditures
Conservative	Joan Crockatt	10,191	36.87	–20.81	$95,251
Liberal	Harvey Locke	9,033	32.68	+15.15	$97,025
Green	Chris Turner	7,090	25.65	+15.72	$100,180
New Democratic	Dan Meades	1,064	3.85	–11.01	$90,148
Independent	Antony Tony Grochowski	141	0.51	–	none listed
Libertarian	Tony Prashad	121	0.44	–	$255
Total valid votes/expense limit		27,640	99.67	–	$102,128.86
Total rejected ballots		92	0.33	–0.20	
Turnout		27,732	29.32	–25.96	
Eligible voters		94,582			
Conservative hold		Swing		–35.96	
Source: Elections Canada
