= Eric Lowther =

Canadian politician

Eric Lowther (born August 31, 1954) is a Canadian politician, who represented the electoral district of Calgary Centre in the House of Commons of Canada from 1997 to 2000. Lowther was born in Regina, Saskatchewan.

Lowther, a business manager before entering politics, was first elected in the 1997 election as a Reform Party MP. With the Reform Party merged into the Canadian Alliance in 2000, he stood as the Alliance candidate in the 2000 election, but was defeated by Progressive Conservative leader Joe Clark.

Lowther ran for the Conservative Party of Canada nomination in the electoral district of Wild Rose, but lost to Blake Richards.

Parliament of Canada
Preceded by Jim Silye	Member of Parliament Calgary Centre; 1997–2000	Succeeded by Joe Clark
