= Calgary Justice Film Festival =

Annual film festival in Alberta, Canada

Coordinates: 51.0209°N 114.0958°W

The Calgary Justice Film Festival (CJFF), formerly the Marda Loop Justice Film Festival (MLJFF), is an annual human-rights film festival that takes place in Calgary, Alberta. Held each November, the festival showcases documentaries related to environmental and social justice.

In addition to documentary screenings, the CJFF hosts an ‘NGO Village’ – a gathering place where non-profit organizations can discuss with festival attendees how to advance positive change.

== History ==
The Marda Loop Justice Film Festival began in the Marda Loop area of Calgary in 2006 under the direction of an informal group of volunteers. To create a lasting foundation for the festival, the Marda Loop Justice Film Festival Society was officially registered on September 14, 2007.

Over 30,000 individuals have attended the Marda Loop Justice Film Festival since its inception in 2006, and in 2015, the festival had over 4500 attendees averaging nearly 230 attendees per screening. All films are recent documentaries focusing on social justice issues which are both broad and relevant. Following a screening of the documentary this group arranges for an expert in the subject matter or issue to lead a time of question and answer. In addition, an NGO (Non Government Organization) Village is organized to facilitate social engagement and action by the viewers of these films. A November festival screens between 21 and 24 films. The justREEL series screens a single film in January, March, May and September. In 2016, the documentaries presented were chosen from a submission pool of more than 1000 filmmakers from over 100 countries.

Because of its success, the MLJFF has helped form satellite festivals across Canada. These satellite festivals occur in Fort MacLeod and Red Deer, Alberta, and Sarnia, Ontario.

In 2021, the MLJFF underwent a rebrand and was renamed the Calgary Justice Film Festival.
