= South Calgary, Calgary =

South Calgary
- Neighbourhood
- Location of South Calgary in Calgary
- Coordinates: 51°01′33″N 114°06′34″W
- Country: Canada
- Province: Alberta
- City: Calgary
- Quadrant: SW
- Ward: 8
- Established: 1914
- Annexed: 1907

Government
  - Mayor: Jeromy Farkas
  - Administrative body: Calgary City Council
  - Councillor: Nathaniel Schmidt (Independent)

Area
  - Total: 1.1 km^{2} (0.42 sq mi)
- Elevation: 1,115 m (3,658 ft)

Population (2006)
  - Total: 3,420
  - Average Income: $38,012
- Postal code: T2T
- Website: South Calgary Community Association

South Calgary is a residential neighbourhood in the southwest quadrant of Calgary, Alberta. It is located between 14th St west and Crowchild Trail. The community has an area redevelopment plan in place.

The community maintains an outdoor swimming pool, as well as a community hall and several city parks. The Giuffre Family Library (previously Alexander Calhoun Library) of the Calgary Public Library is also located in the area.

South Calgary was established in 1914 on land annexed by the City of Calgary in 1907. However, the area remained largely undeveloped until the early 1950s.

== Demographics ==
In the City of Calgary's 2012 municipal census, South Calgary had a population of 3,698 living in 2,244 dwellings, a 1.5% increase from its 2011 population of 3,642. With a land area of 0.9 km^{2} (0.35 sq mi), it had a population density of 4,110/km^{2} (10,600/sq mi) in 2012.

Residents in South Calgary had a median household income of $38,012 in 2000, and 28.2% low-income residents live in the neighbourhood. 61.1% of the properties were used for renting in 2001.

== Government ==
South Calgary is represented in the Calgary City Council by Ward 8 councillor Courtney Walcott, on a provincial level by Calgary Currie MLA Nicholas Milliken and Calgary-Elbow MLA Doug Schweitzer, and at the federal level the riding of Calgary Centre represented by Greg McLean.

== See also ==
- List of neighbourhoods in Calgary
