= Kent Hehr =

Canadian politician (born 1969)

The Honourable Kent Hehr PC
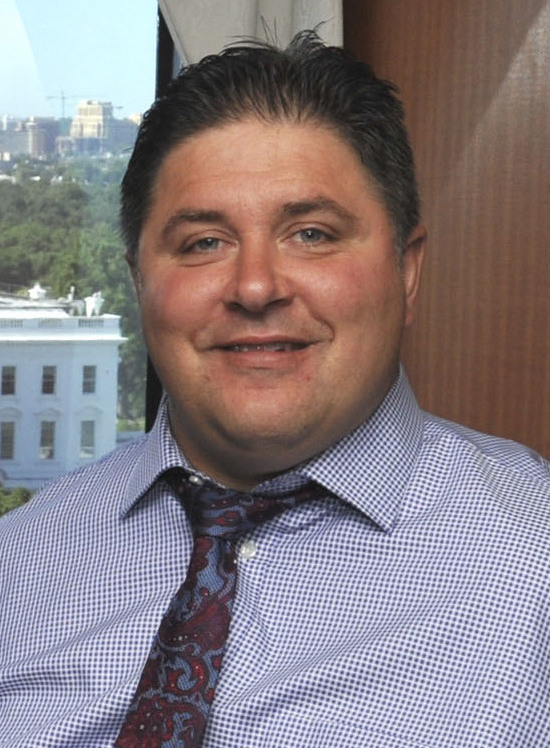

Minister of Sport and Persons with Disabilities
- In office August 28, 2017 – January 25, 2018
- Prime Minister: Justin Trudeau
- Preceded by: Carla Qualtrough
- Succeeded by: Kirsty Duncan

Minister of Veterans Affairs
- In office November 4, 2015 – August 28, 2017
- Prime Minister: Justin Trudeau
- Preceded by: Erin O'Toole
- Succeeded by: Seamus O'Regan

Associate Minister of National Defence
- In office November 4, 2015 – August 28, 2017
- Prime Minister: Justin Trudeau
- Preceded by: Julian Fantino
- Succeeded by: Seamus O'Regan

Member of Parliament for Calgary Centre
- In office October 19, 2015 – October 21, 2019
- Preceded by: Joan Crockatt
- Succeeded by: Greg McLean

Member of the Legislative Assembly of Alberta for Calgary-Buffalo
- In office March 3, 2008 – May 5, 2015
- Preceded by: Harvey Cenaiko
- Succeeded by: Kathleen Ganley

Personal details
- Born: December 16, 1969 (age 56) Calgary, Alberta, Canada
- Party: Liberal Party of Canada
- Education: University of Calgary
- Profession: Lawyer
- Website: www.kenthehr.ca

Kent Hehr PC (born December 16, 1969) is a former Canadian politician from Alberta. He served as the Liberal Member of Parliament for the riding of Calgary Centre from 2015 to 2019. Hehr was named Minister of Veterans Affairs in the federal Cabinet, headed by Justin Trudeau, on November 4, 2015, and was shuffled to be Minister of Sport and Persons with Disabilities in August 2017. Hehr resigned from cabinet on January 25, 2018, after allegations of workplace misconduct surfaced from when he was the Member of the Legislative Assembly of Alberta for Calgary-Buffalo.

On September 6, 2021, it was reported that Hehr would file nomination papers to run for mayor in the 2021 Calgary municipal election. He filed for that office but withdrew his candidacy later in September, citing the heightened risks from COVID-19 infection for people with spinal cord injuries.

Before entering politics, Hehr worked as a disability activist and a lawyer.

== Personal life ==
As a teenager, Hehr was active in sports including both baseball and hockey. These are interests which Hehr is still passionate about to this day. He played for the Alberta Junior Hockey League champion Calgary Canucks in 1989–90 and for the Mount Royal College Cougars the following year.

He had a goal of becoming a physical education teacher. However, on October 3, 1991, Hehr was shot as a bystander in a drive-by shooting. He was rendered a C5 quadriplegic; he is paralyzed from the chest down. His injuries ended his plans, and instead Hehr pursued post-secondary studies at Mount Royal College and then at the University of Calgary, from which he earned a Bachelor of Arts in Canadian Studies and a Bachelor of Laws. Upon graduation he was named graduate of the decade and ranked among the top 40 graduates in 40 years. Prior to being elected Member of the Legislative Assembly, Hehr practised law at Fraser Milner Casgrain.

Hehr also became active in the community, leading various groups, such as the Alberta branch of the Canadian Paraplegic Association. In 2008, he was listed as one of "20 Compelling Calgarians" by the Calgary Herald.

Hehr has also been active in numerous community groups within Calgary. He has served on the following boards in the past few years:

- National Education Association of Disabled Students, president
- Calgary Advisory Committee on Accessibility, chair
- Spinal Cord Injury Alberta, chair
- Calgary Downtown West Community Association
- United Way of Calgary Leaders Committee
- Calgary Canuck Alumni Association

== Provincial politics ==
In June 2006, Hehr won the Liberal nomination for Calgary-Buffalo, in the heart of downtown Calgary. He was subsequently elected to the legislature in the March 3, 2008 general election.

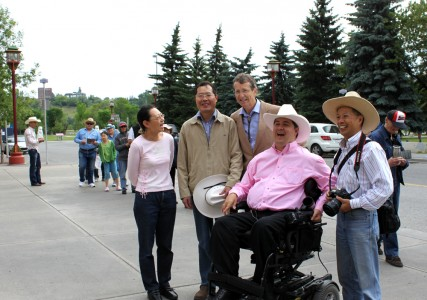
Kent Hehr and David Swann at the Calgary Stampede

After the election, Hehr was chosen to be the Shadow Minister for Justice and Solicitor General for the Alberta Liberal Caucus. As the Shadow Minister, Hehr worked to tackle crime in the province while focusing on other justice issues.

In the legislature, Hehr served on the following committees:

- Special Standing Committee on Member Services
- Standing Committee on Community Services (deputy chair)
- Standing Committee on Resource and Environment

Hehr campaigned for mayor in the 2010 Calgary municipal election but withdrew a month before the vote to endorse Naheed Nenshi.

=== LGBT rights ===
In 2014, Hehr proposed a private member's bill into the Alberta Legislature that would urge public schools to support students who wished to create gay-straight alliances. The bill, while supported by the Liberals, Alberta NDP and some Progressive Conservatives, was voted down by a majority of PC and Wildrose MLAs in April.

Six months later Laurie Blakeman brought a private members bill forward which essentially adopted Hehr's motion. Instead of allowing a vote to proceed on this motion, the PC government brought in their own bill, the essence of which allowed public, Catholic, and private school entities to decide whether or not they would allow a Gay-Straight Alliance in their district. Ultimately the PCs brought in a reformed bill that effectively allowed Gay-Straight Alliances in all schools throughout the province.

=== Gun violence ===
For Hehr, himself a shooting victim, a major focus has been on gun violence in the province. Soon after he was elected, the City of Calgary became trapped in a gang war which has claimed the lives of many young individuals.

Hehr put pressure on the government to help reduce these numbers. He started by calling on the province to increase the number of police officers on the beat in downtown Calgary. The Mayor and the Police Chief have also joined in his call to increase the number of police officers.

Hehr's most recent call was to give police the power to seize vehicles that contain unregistered firearms, along with the gun. Bill 201 was defeated in second reading on March 9, 2009, with no Conservative MLA support.

== Federal politics ==
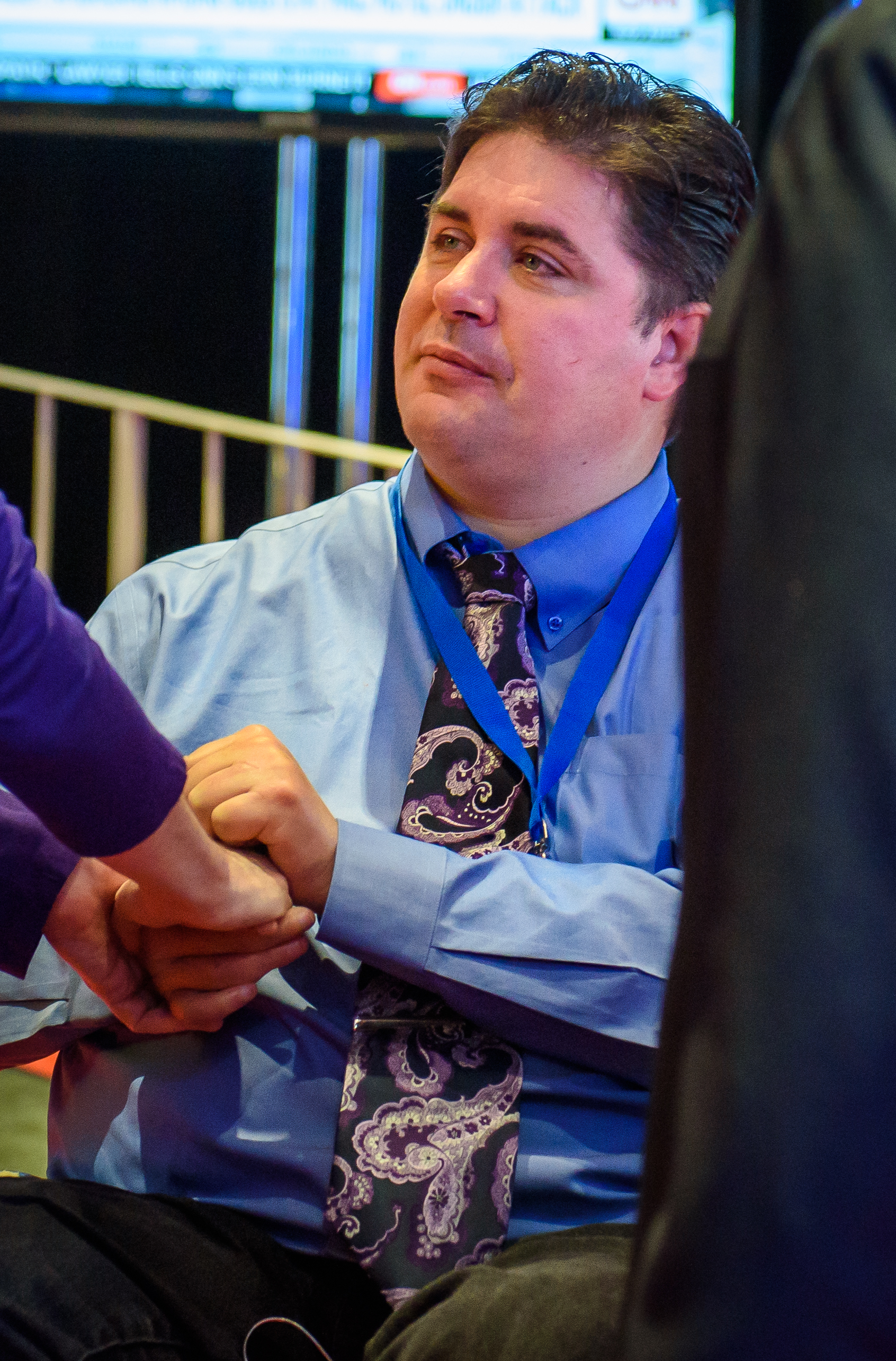
Hehr at the 2015 Halifax International Security Forum

On July 17, 2014, following some speculation, Hehr announced he would seek the Liberal nomination in Calgary Centre for the 2015 federal election. On November 28, he was acclaimed as the Liberal candidate. The Liberals were very optimistic about their chances in the riding. Conservative incumbent Joan Crockatt had only won a 2012 by-election with 37 percent of the vote, the worst showing for a Tory in Calgary in recent memory. Additionally, a redistribution made the riding slightly friendlier to the Liberals on paper.

At the October 19, 2015 election, Hehr defeated Crockatt by 750 votes. Alongside Calgary Skyview member of Parliament Darshan Kang, who was elected the same evening, Hehr became the first Liberal elected in Calgary since Pat Mahoney in 1968. He and Kang are only the fifth and sixth Liberals to represent Calgary ridings in the party's entire history.

Hehr was appointed Minister of Veterans Affairs and Associate Minister of National Defence in Justin Trudeau's first cabinet on November 4, 2015.

In a cabinet shuffle in late 2017, Hehr became Minister of Sport and Persons with Disabilities, succeeding Carla Qualtrough on August 28, 2017.

In November 2017, it was reported that the Ethics Commissioner was investigating Hehr following accusations that he used Parliamentary Resources to help his father campaign for a seat on the Calgary Board of Education. He was subsequently cleared in this investigation.

In December 2017, Hehr was accused of making insensitive remarks to a group of thalidomide survivors. In a meeting early that year, the members of the group accused Hehr of inappropriate touching, saying "Well you don't have it so bad. Everyone in Canada has a sob story", and in reference to their reduced life expectancy "So you probably have about 10 years left then now, that's good news for the Canadian government." He denied making the statement.

Shortly after, a wife of a veteran with posttraumatic stress disorder came forward accusing him of poor treatment during a meeting in October 2016. The woman said he was "very condescending", gave her only two minutes of his time, when asked a question about the government denying maternity benefits he replied "Well, Ms. McCrea, that is the old question, like asking ... 'When did you stop beating your wife?'", and when asked about support for her family he allegedly responded "you married him, he's your responsibility".

== Sexual harassment allegations ==
Hehr resigned from cabinet on January 25, 2018, amid two separate allegations of sexual harassment dating to his time in the Alberta legislature. One woman claimed that he had made sexually suggestive remarks to her, while another claimed he'd touched her inappropriately. Hehr apologized for the first incident, saying that while he did not remember meeting the woman, he realized that he had made her uncomfortable. However, he maintained that the second incident was the product of unintentional contact. On June 6, 2018, following the completion of the investigation, Trudeau decided that Hehr would not return to cabinet.

He lost his seat to Conservative Greg McLean in the 2019 federal election, losing over half of his vote from 2015.

== 2021 mayoral campaign ==
On September 6, 2021, Global News reported that Hehr would be filing nomination papers to run for mayor in the 2021 Calgary municipal election, which was scheduled for October 18. After announcing his mayoral campaign that day, Hehr said that he would allow the report into his sexual misconduct allegations to be made public. He had previously argued that they should not be released over privacy concerns. Hehr withdrew from the race on September 21, the last possible day to do so, citing personal health risks from COVID-19.

== Electoral record ==
=== Federal ===
2019 Canadian federal election: Calgary Centre
Party	Candidate	Votes	%	±%	Expenditures
Conservative	Greg McLean	37,306	56.64	+11.34	$105,315.36
Liberal	Kent Hehr	17,771	26.98	–19.54	$114,751.64
New Democratic	Jessica Buresi	6,516	9.89	+4.32	$832.79
Green	Thana Boonlert	2,853	4.33	+2.13	$7,973.82
People's	Chevy Johnston	907	1.38	–	$13,514.03
Animal Protection	Eden Gould	247	0.38	–	$1,717.18
Independent	Michael Pewtress	138	0.21	–	$1,189.15
Christian Heritage	Dawid Pawlowski	126	0.19	–	$4,427.07
Total valid votes/expense limit		65,864	99.42	–	$119,599.33
Total rejected ballots		385	0.58	+0.21	
Turnout		66,249	68.21	–1.89	
Eligible voters		97,129			
Conservative gain from Liberal		Swing		+15.44	
Source: Elections Canada

2015 Canadian federal election: Calgary Centre
Party	Candidate	Votes	%	±%	Expenditures
Liberal	Kent Hehr	28,496	46.52	+27.40	$190,509.57
Conservative	Joan Crockatt	27,746	45.30	−10.07	$157,845.73
New Democratic	Jillian Ratti	3,412	5.57	−9.59	$19,466.71
Green	Thana Boonlert	1,347	2.20	−8.13	$3,584.84
Independent	Yogi Henderson	248	0.39		$1,203.28
Total valid votes/Expense limit		61,249	100.00		$222,181.20
Total rejected ballots		227	0.37	–	
Turnout		61,476	72.36	–	
Eligible voters		84,960			
Liberal gain from Conservative		Swing		+18.73	
Source: Elections Canada

=== Provincial ===
2012 Alberta general election: Calgary-Buffalo
Party	Candidate	Votes	%	±%
Liberal	Kent Hehr	4,740	41.47%	-7.36%
Progressive Conservative	Jamie Lall	3,506	30.67%	-8.18%
Wildrose	Mike Blanchard	2,415	21.13%	–
New Democratic	Rebecca Eras	539	4.72%	0.59%
Alberta Party	Cory Mack	230	2.01%	–
Total		11,430	–	–
Rejected, spoiled and declined		176	–	–
Eligible electors / turnout		26,220	44.26%	13.88%
Liberal hold		Swing		0.41%
Source(s) Source: "05 - Calgary-Buffalo, 2012 Alberta general election". officialresults.elections.ab.ca. Elections Alberta.

2008 Alberta general election: Calgary-Buffalo
Party	Candidate	Votes	%	±%
Liberal	Kent Hehr	4,583	48.83%	12.42%
Progressive Conservative	Sean Chu	3,646	38.85%	-4.68%
Green	Stephen Ricketts	611	6.51%	-2.16%
New Democratic	Robert Lawrence	387	4.12%	-1.79%
Social Credit	Antoni (Tony) Grochowski	158	1.68%	0.74%
Total		9,385	–	–
Rejected, spoiled and declined		103	–	–
Eligible electors / turnout		31,223	30.39%	-1.33%
Liberal gain from Progressive Conservative		Swing		1.43%
Source(s) Source: "03 - Calgary-Buffalo, 2008 Alberta general election". officialresults.elections.ab.ca. Elections Alberta. The Report on the March 3, 2008 Provincial General Election of the Twenty-seventh Legislative Assembly. Elections Alberta. July 28, 2008. pp. 178–180.

=== Municipal ===
2025 Calgary municipal Ward 8 city council election

Party	Candidate	Vote	%
Independent	Nathaniel Schmidt	8,806	32.58
Communities First	Cornelia Wiebe	7,754	28.69
Independent	Gary Bobrovitz	4,871	18.02
Independent	Kent Hehr	3,539	13.09
Independent	Josie Kirkpatrick	1,519	5.62
Independent	Miguel Cortines	539	1.99

29th Canadian Ministry (2015–2025) – Cabinet of Justin Trudeau
Cabinet posts (3)
Predecessor	Office	Successor
Carla Qualtrough	Minister of Sport and Persons with Disabilities; August 28, 2017 – January 25, 2018	Kirsty Duncan
Erin O'Toole	Minister of Veterans Affairs; November 4, 2015 – August 28, 2017	Seamus O'Regan
Julian Fantino	Associate Minister of Defence; November 4, 2015 – August 28, 2017	Seamus O'Regan
