= Greg McLean (politician) =

Canadian politician

Greg McLean MP
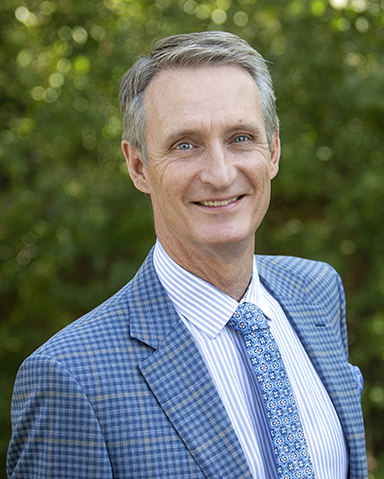
- McLean in 2023

Member of Parliament for Calgary Centre
- Incumbent
- Assumed office October 21, 2019
- Preceded by: Kent Hehr

Personal details
- Party: Conservative
- Spouse: Ruth Pogue
- Children: 4
- Education: University of Alberta (BCom); Richard Ivey School of Business (MBA)

Greg McLean MP is a Canadian politician who was first elected to represent the riding of Calgary Centre in the House of Commons of Canada in the 2019 Canadian federal election. He defeated then-cabinet minister, Kent Hehr, by 20,000 votes.

During the 2021 Canadian federal election, McLean was re-elected for a second term with 51% of the vote.

== Personal life ==
Before his election, McLean was a financial professional for 20 years, working with oil and gas and technology start-ups amongst other industries. He was a Chartered Investment Manager, registered as a Portfolio Manager with the Alberta Securities Commission.

Early in his career, he spent six years advising federal Cabinet Ministers Harvie Andre and Jean Corbeil, providing insight into government and regulatory decision-making.

McLean has a Bachelor of Commerce degree from the University of Alberta, and an MBA from the Richard Ivey School of Business at the University of Western Ontario.

McLean and his wife Ruth Pogue have four sons.

== Political career ==
In the 2019 Canadian federal election, McLean was elected to represent Calgary Centre in the House of Commons for the 43rd Canadian Parliament. He introduced two private member's bills, Bill C-262 and Bill C-214, both of which focused on the Income Tax Act.

=== Private member's bills ===
Bill C-262, An Act to amend the Income Tax Act (capture and utilization or storage of greenhouse gases) sought to create a tax credit for expenses incurred by a corporation capturing and storing greenhouse gases. The bill was brought to a vote on June 9, 2021, but it was defeated at the second reading, with only Conservative Party MPs voting in favour.

Bill C-214 An Act to amend the Income Tax Act (qualifying environmental trust), which sought to add oil or gas wells to the list of sites that environmental trusts may hold for the purposes of the Qualifying Environmental Trust income tax rate, was discharged without a vote.

=== Political appointments and committees ===
==== 43rd Parliament ====
On September 9, 2020, then Conservative Leader Erin O'Toole named McLean the Shadow Minister for Natural Resources and for the Canadian Northern Economic Development Agency (CanNor). McLean served in this role until August 15, 2021. After the 2021 election, McLean resumed his position as Shadow Minister for Natural Resources and for the Canadian Northern Economic Development Agency in February 22, 2022 until October 11, 2022.

During the 1st session of the 43rd Parliament, McLean served on the Standing Committee on Justice and Human Rights (February 2020 to August 2020) and on the Special Committee on the COVID-19 Pandemic (April 2020 to June 2020). During the 2nd session of the 43rd Parliament, McLean served on the Standing Committee on Natural Resources as the committee Vice-Chair (October 2020 to August 2021).

==== 44th Parliament ====
After the 2021 election, McLean served briefly during the 1st session of the 44th Parliament as the Vice-Chair of the Standing Committee on Finance (December 2021 to February 2022) before returning to the post of Shadow Minister for Natural Resources and the Natural Resources Standing Committee in late February 2022. McLean also served on the Standing Committee on Natural Resources (February 2022 to October 2022) and the Standing Committee on the Environment and Sustainable Development (October 2022 to September 2023).

McLean's most recent role has been as a member of the Standing Committee on Citizenship and Immigration. McLean served in this role from September 20, 2023 until January 6, 2025.

=== Issues and focus ===
McLean's questions and speeches in the House of Commons have focused primarily on issues related to natural resources and finance.

==== Natural resources ====
McLean has called the Trudeau government's emissions and carbon taxation policies "ineffective" and economically damaging, and has asserted that Canada will not meet the Paris Agreement's greenhouse gas reduction goals.

McLean has opposed Bill C-69, which passed in 2019 as the Impact Assessment Act and Canadian Energy Regulator Act. The bill allowed federal regulators to assess the environmental and social impacts of various resource and infrastructure projects. Many Alberta politicians opposed the legislation, with some, such as former Alberta Premier Jason Kenney, stating it was essentially a "no more pipelines act". The bill was ruled unconstitutional by the Supreme Court of Canada in 2023, with a 5–2 majority.

McLean opposed the federal government's goal for a net-zero electricity grid by 2035, calling the goal "unreasonable". He claimed that the goals, in addition to the energy emissions cap, were incompatible with Alberta's economy.

==== Finance ====
McLean has opposed the Trudeau government's federal deficit increases and debt accumulation. McLean described the 2024 Fall Economic Statement, which reported a deficit of $61.9 billion for the 2023–2024 fiscal year, as a "fiasco" and claimed that the Trudeau government ignored its own "fiscal guardrails".

In his speeches in the House of Commons he has highlighted the fact that current interest payments on the government's debt now exceed the yearly health care transfer payments. He has claimed that this debt will now fall to future generations to pay off. He has suggested that future governments will be left with empty coffers and will have no emergency funds to deal with future crises. During the COVID-19 pandemic, he spoke about the efficacy of government programs and expenditures, particularly focusing on the Canada Student Service Grant and its sole-source contract to the WE charity (since terminated).

McLean has suggested the proposed capital gains tax increase would discourage private investment into desperately needed capital growth. He asserted that it would also strain Canadians' savings accounts and retirement investments.

== Electoral record ==
2025 Canadian federal election: Calgary Centre
Party	Candidate	Votes	%	±%	Expenditures
Conservative	Greg McLean	31,604	50.21	–0.71	$92,755.44
Liberal	Lindsay Luhnau	28,824	45.79	+15.73	$105,155.31
New Democratic	Beau Shaw	1,665	2.65	–13.77	$12,670.74
People's	Robert Hawley	365	0.58	–	none listed
Green	Jayden Baldonado	362	0.58	–1.05	none listed
Neo Rhino	Scott Fea	126	0.20	–	none listed
Total valid votes/expense limit		62,946	99.39	–	$136,676.30
Total rejected ballots		387	0.61	–0.24	
Turnout		63,333	68.61	+5.88	
Eligible voters		92,309			
Conservative notional hold		Swing		–8.59	
Source: Elections Canada

2021 Canadian federal election: Calgary Centre
Party	Candidate	Votes	%	±%	Expenditures
Conservative	Greg McLean	30,375	51.30	–5.34	$66,265.71
Liberal	Sabrina Grover	17,593	29.71	+2.73	$71,053.48
New Democratic	Juan Estevez Moreno	9,694	16.37	+6.48	$3,174.97
Green	Austin Mullins	971	1.64	–2.69	$415.62
Christian Heritage	Dawid Pawlowski	575	0.97	+0.78	$4,650.00
Total valid votes/expense limit		59,208	99.15	–	$122,167.91
Total rejected ballots		509	0.85	+0.27	
Turnout		59,717	62.73	–5.47	
Eligible voters		95,190			
Conservative hold		Swing		–4.04	
Source: Elections Canada

2019 Canadian federal election: Calgary Centre
Party	Candidate	Votes	%	±%	Expenditures
Conservative	Greg McLean	37,306	56.64	+11.34	$105,315.36
Liberal	Kent Hehr	17,771	26.98	–19.54	$114,751.64
New Democratic	Jessica Buresi	6,516	9.89	+4.32	$832.79
Green	Thana Boonlert	2,853	4.33	+2.13	$7,973.82
People's	Chevy Johnston	907	1.38	–	$13,514.03
Animal Protection	Eden Gould	247	0.38	–	$1,717.18
Independent	Michael Pewtress	138	0.21	–	$1,189.15
Christian Heritage	Dawid Pawlowski	126	0.19	–	$4,427.07
Total valid votes/expense limit		65,864	99.42	–	$119,599.33
Total rejected ballots		385	0.58	+0.21	
Turnout		66,249	68.21	–1.89	
Eligible voters		97,129			
Conservative gain from Liberal		Swing		+15.44	
Source: Elections Canada
